= Kimono =

Traditional Japanese garment

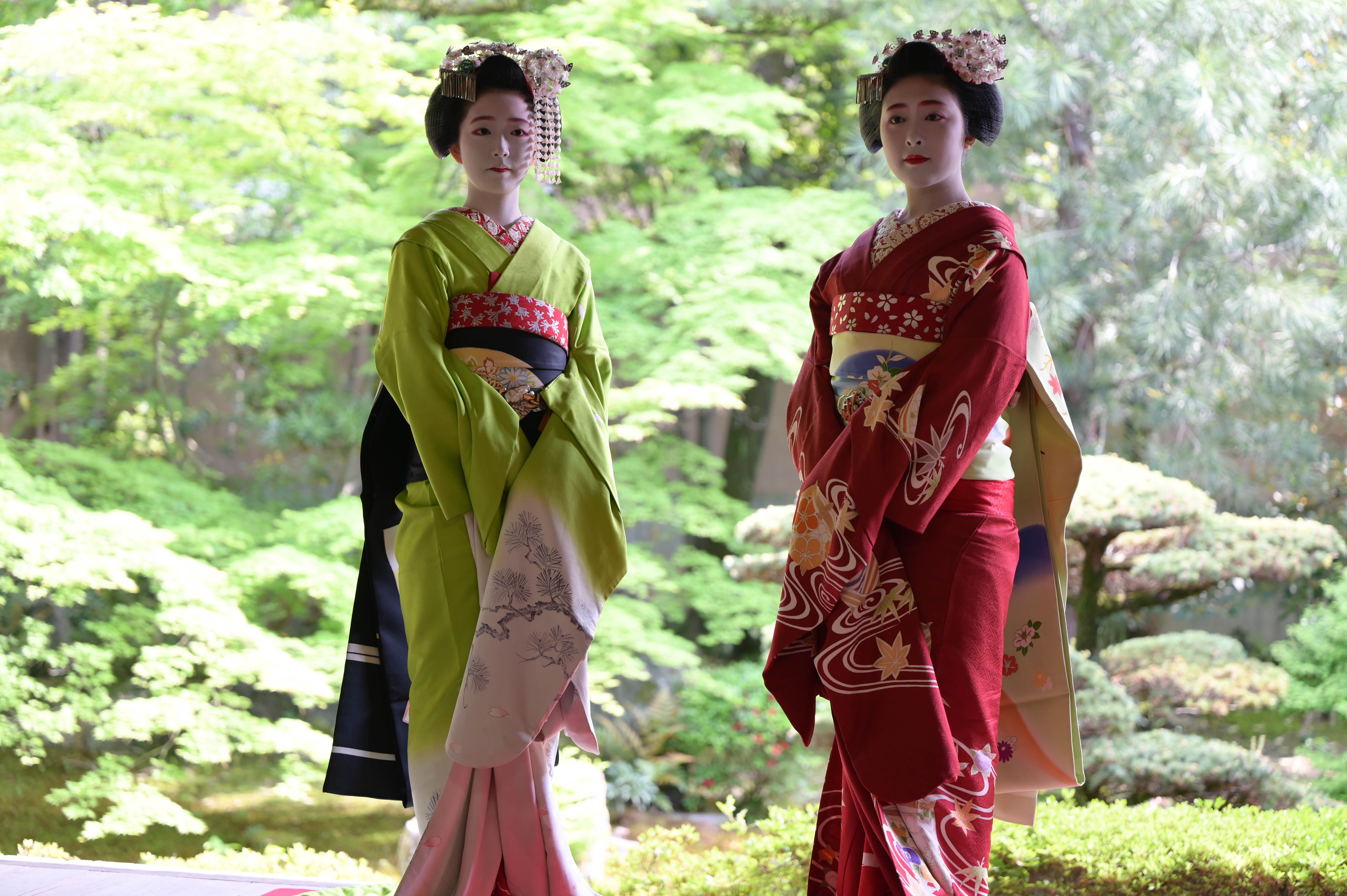
- Type: Japanese clothing
- Material: Ramie; Satin
- Place of origin: Japan
- Introduced: 794 AD

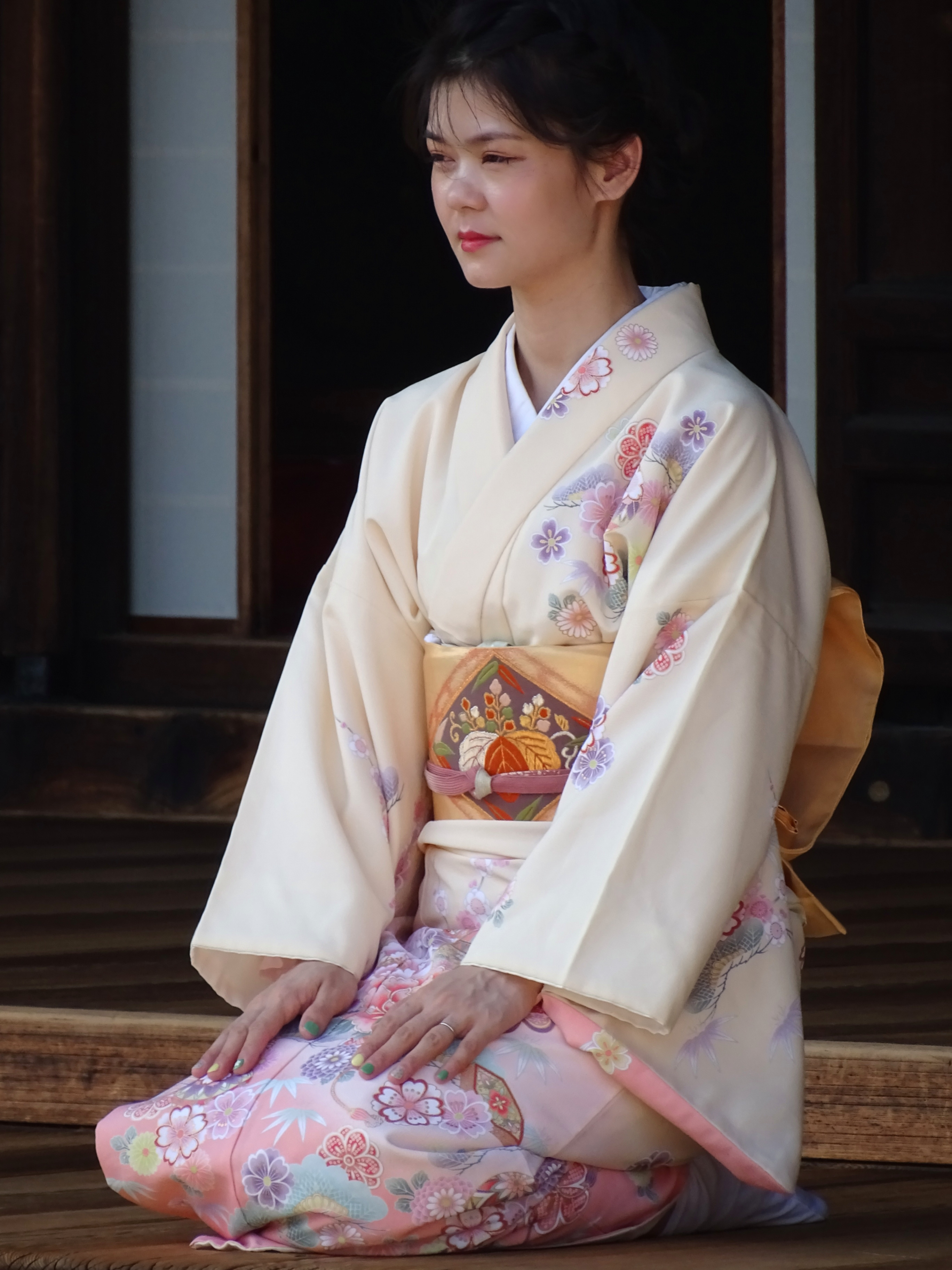
A Zen temple-goer wearing a formal cherry-blossom-motif kimono

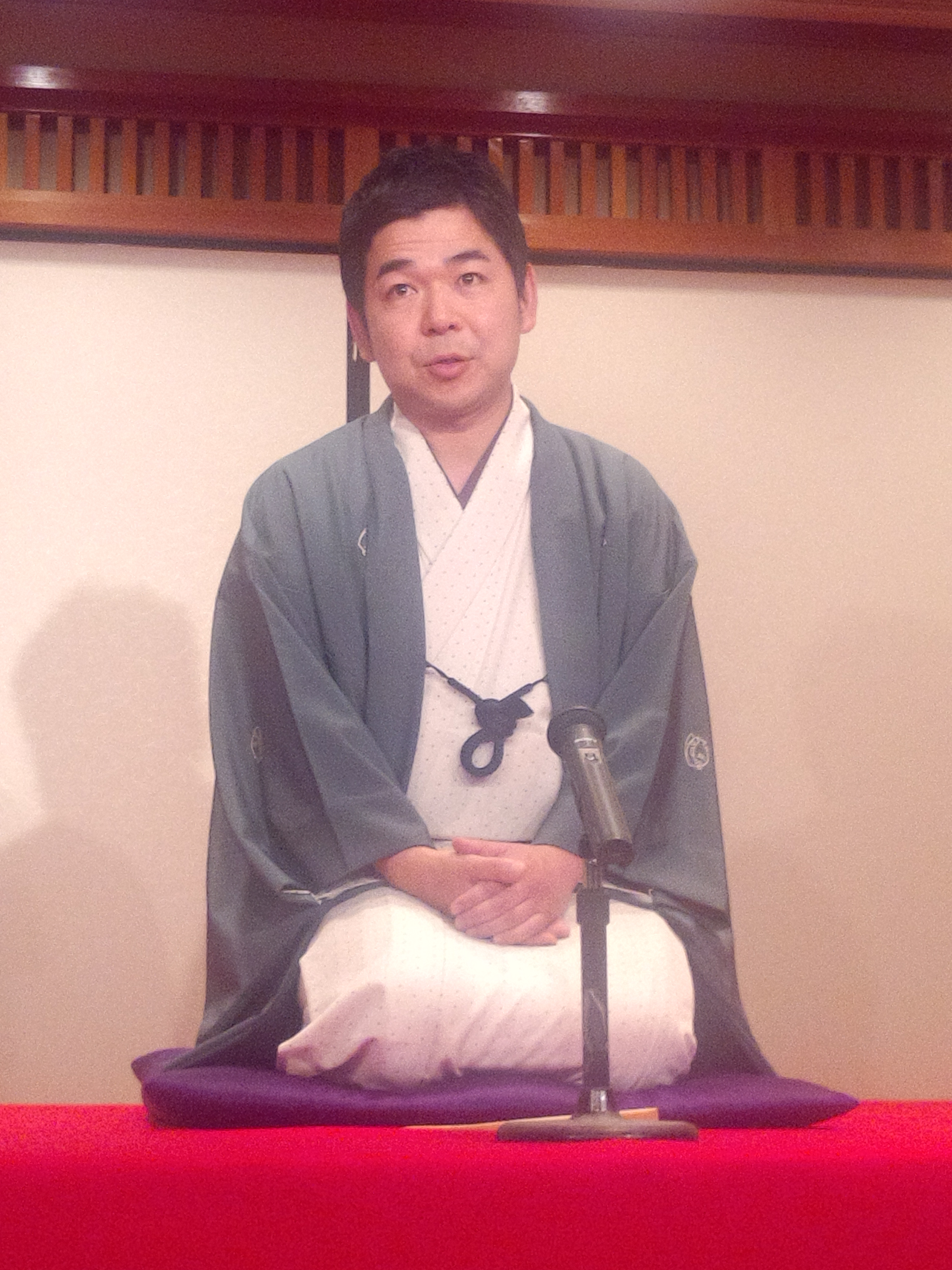
A rakugoka (storyteller) wearing kimono and 5-mon haori

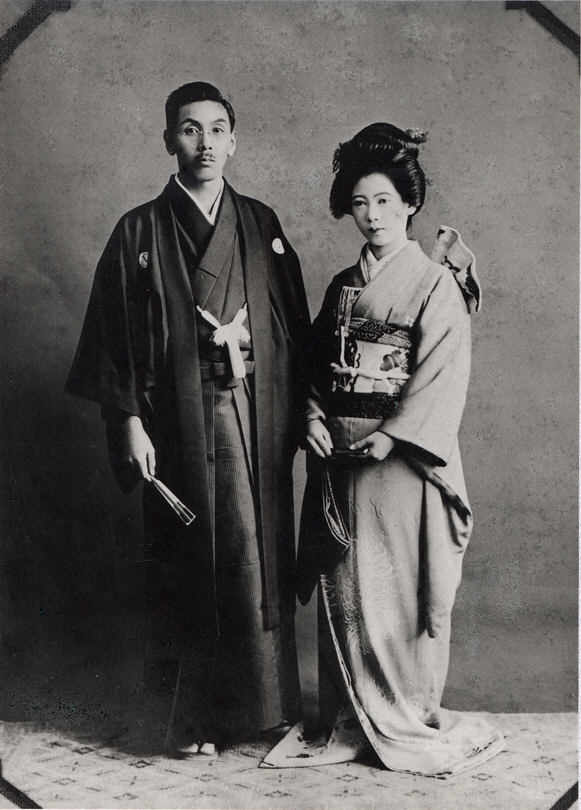
A man and a woman wearing formal kimono, for a 1923 wedding (other views)

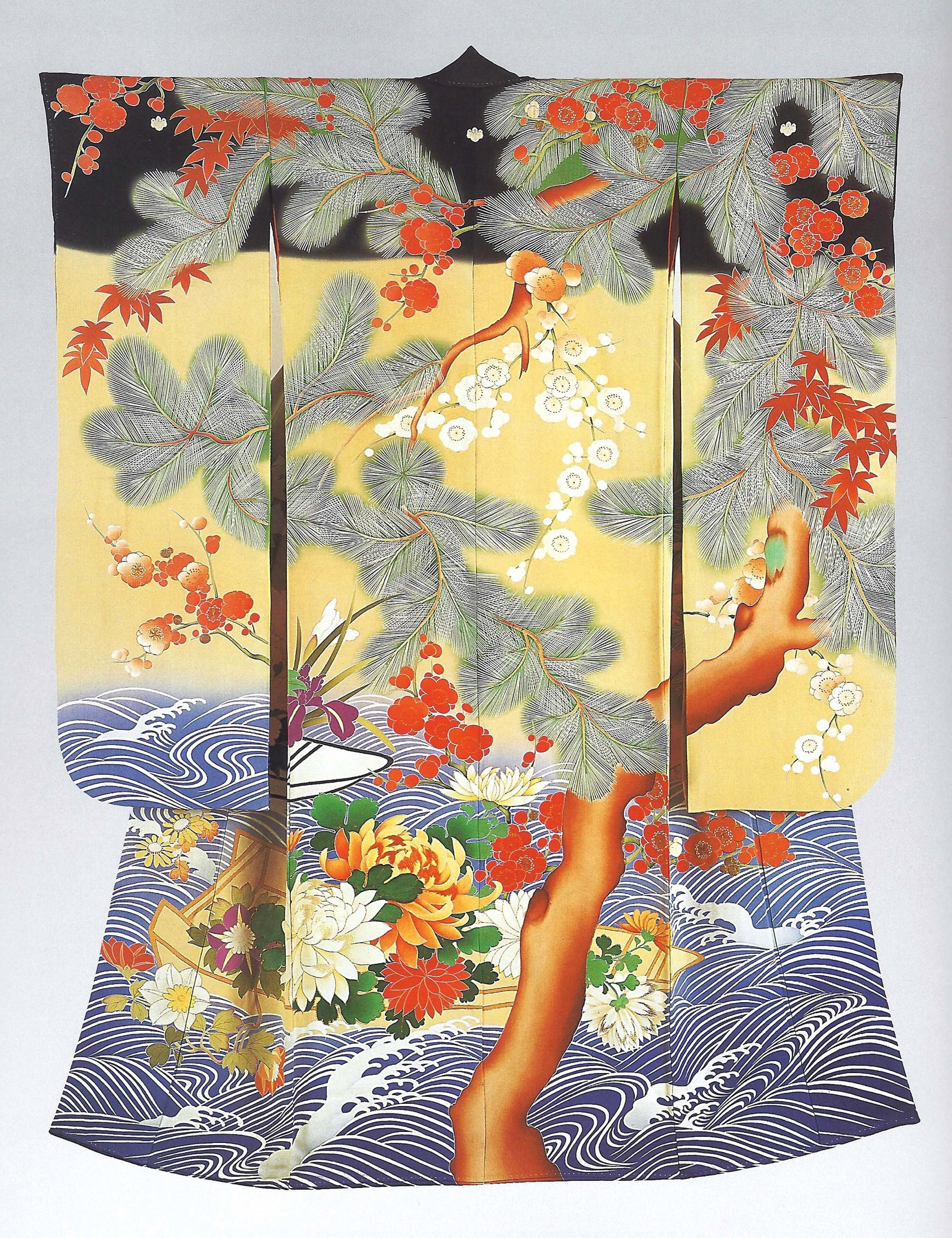
Kimono for a young woman, depicting a boat on swirling water, with pine tree, plum blossoms and maples. Japan, 1912–1926. From the Khalili Collection of Kimono

The kimono (着物; Japanese pronunciation: [kʲi.mo.no], lit. 'thing to wear') (Note: The term kimono comes from the verb 'to wear (on the shoulders)' (着る, kiru), and the noun 'thing' (物, mono). Though 'kimonos' is technically an acceptable plural for the term kimono in English, Japanese has no conventions of adding an -s suffix to denote plurality in transliterated words; thus, most sources in English use kimono as both singular and plural.) is a traditional Japanese garment and the national dress of Japan. The kimono is a wrapped-front garment with square sleeves and a rectangular body, and is worn left side wrapped over right, unless the wearer is deceased. The kimono is traditionally worn with a broad sash, called an obi, and is commonly worn with accessories such as zōri sandals and tabi socks.

Kimonos have a set method of construction and are typically made from a long, narrow bolt of cloth known as a tanmono, though Western-style fabric bolts are also sometimes used. There are different types of kimono for men, women, and children, varying based on the occasion, the season, the wearer's age, and – less commonly in the modern day – the wearer's marital status. Despite the kimono's reputation as a formal and difficult-to-wear garment, there are types of kimono suitable for both formal and informal occasions. The way a person wears their kimono is known as kitsuke (着付け, lit. 'dressing').

Until the Edo period (1603–1868), garments that resembled modern kimonos, characterized by narrow sleeve openings and hanging sleeves, were collectively referred to as kosode. In the late ninth century of the Heian period (794–1185), Japanese clothing began to diverge from Chinese styles, giving rise to uniquely Japanese garments such as the jūnihitoe. During this time, members of the court and the warrior class wore white kosode as underwear. In the Sengoku period, which corresponds to the late Muromachi period (1336–1573), the kosode, originally a simple undergarment, developed into a more elaborate outer garment, becoming the direct predecessor of the modern kimono.

Formerly the most common Japanese garment, the kimono has fallen out of favour and is rarely worn as everyday dress now. They are most often seen at summer festivals, where people frequently wear the yukata, the most informal type of kimono. More formal types are worn to funerals, weddings, graduations, and other formal events. Geisha and maiko are required to wear a kimono as part of their profession, and rikishi (sumo wrestlers) must wear kimonos at all times in public. Despite the small number of people who wear it regularly and its reputation as a complicated garment, the kimono has experienced revivals in previous decades, and is still worn today as fashionable clothing in Japan.

== History ==
=== Yamato period to Nara period (300–794) ===
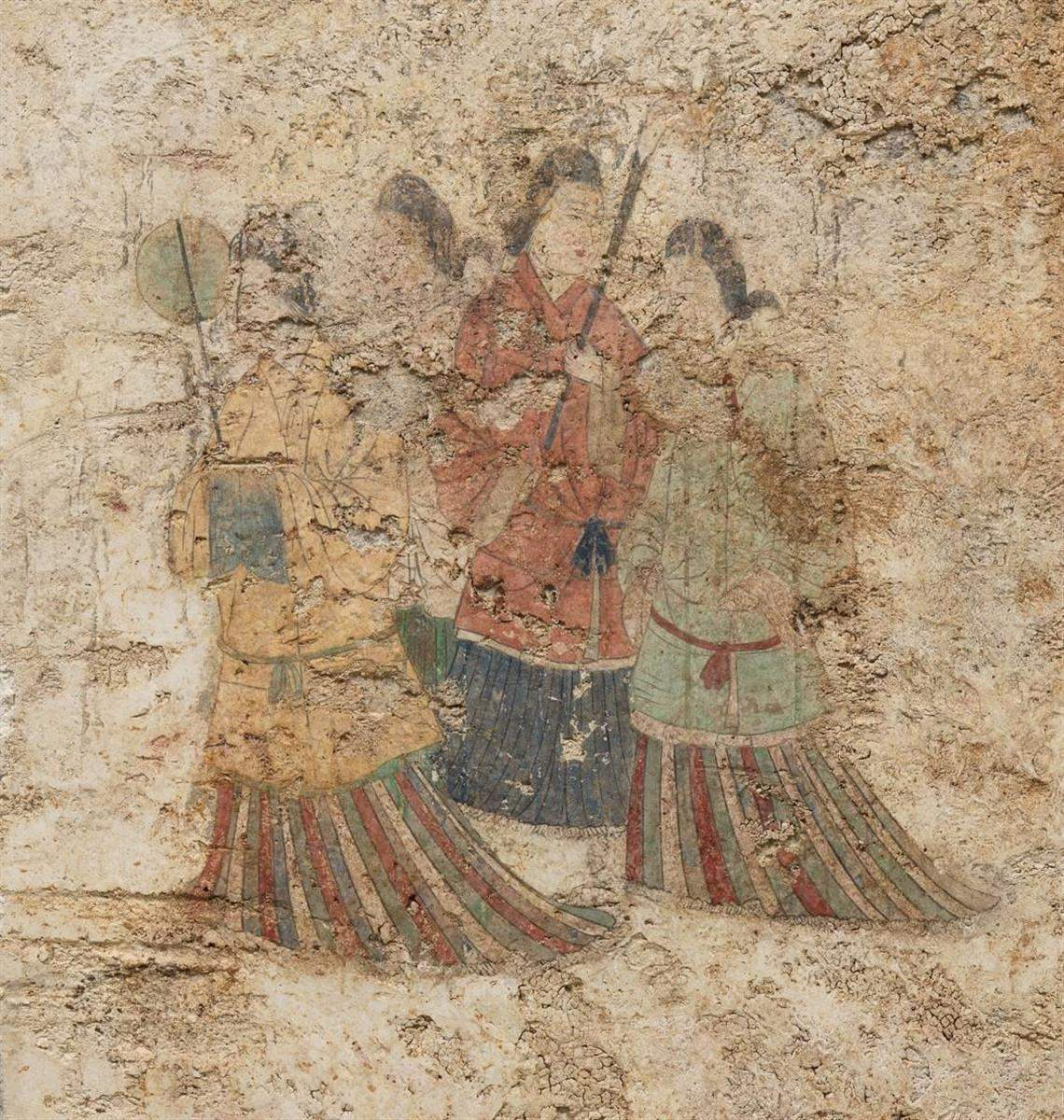
Mural in the Takamatsuzuka Tomb, c. 700 CE. Each woman wears a loose-fitting wrap-front robe over a brightly-coloured mо̄ skirt.

The first instances of kimono-like garments in Japan were traditional Chinese clothing introduced to Japan via Chinese envoys in the Kofun period (300–538 CE; the first part of the Yamato period), through immigration between the two countries and envoys to the Tang dynasty court leading to Chinese styles of dress, appearance, and culture becoming extremely popular in Japanese court society. The Imperial Japanese court quickly adopted Chinese styles of dress and clothing, with evidence of the oldest samples of shibori tie-dyed fabric stored at the Shōsōin Temple being of Chinese origin, due to the limitations of Japan's ability to produce the fabrics at the time. As early as the 4th century CE, images of priestess-queens and tribal chiefs in Japan depicted figures wearing clothing similar to that of Han dynasty China.

In 718 CE, the Yōrō legal code was instituted; one of its stipulations that all robes had to be overlapped at the front with a left-over-right closure, following typical Chinese fashions. This convention of wear is still followed today, with a right-over-left closure worn only by the deceased.

Clothing used by the upper classes was significantly simpler to don and wear than dress from the following Heian period. Sleeves, while narrow, were long enough to cover the fingers, since status was associated with covering more of the body.

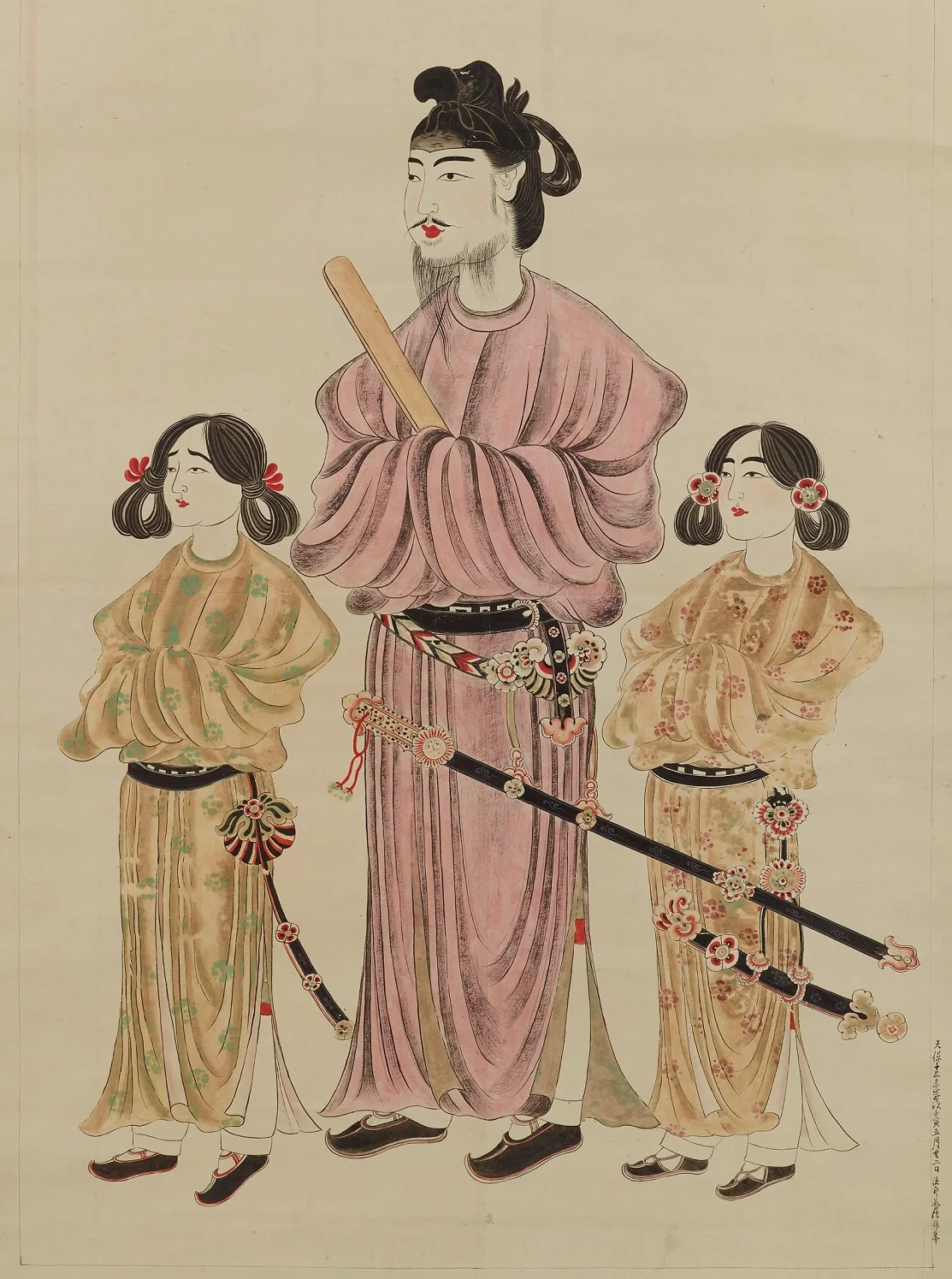
Asuka period (538–710 CE) portrait of Prince Shōtoku.

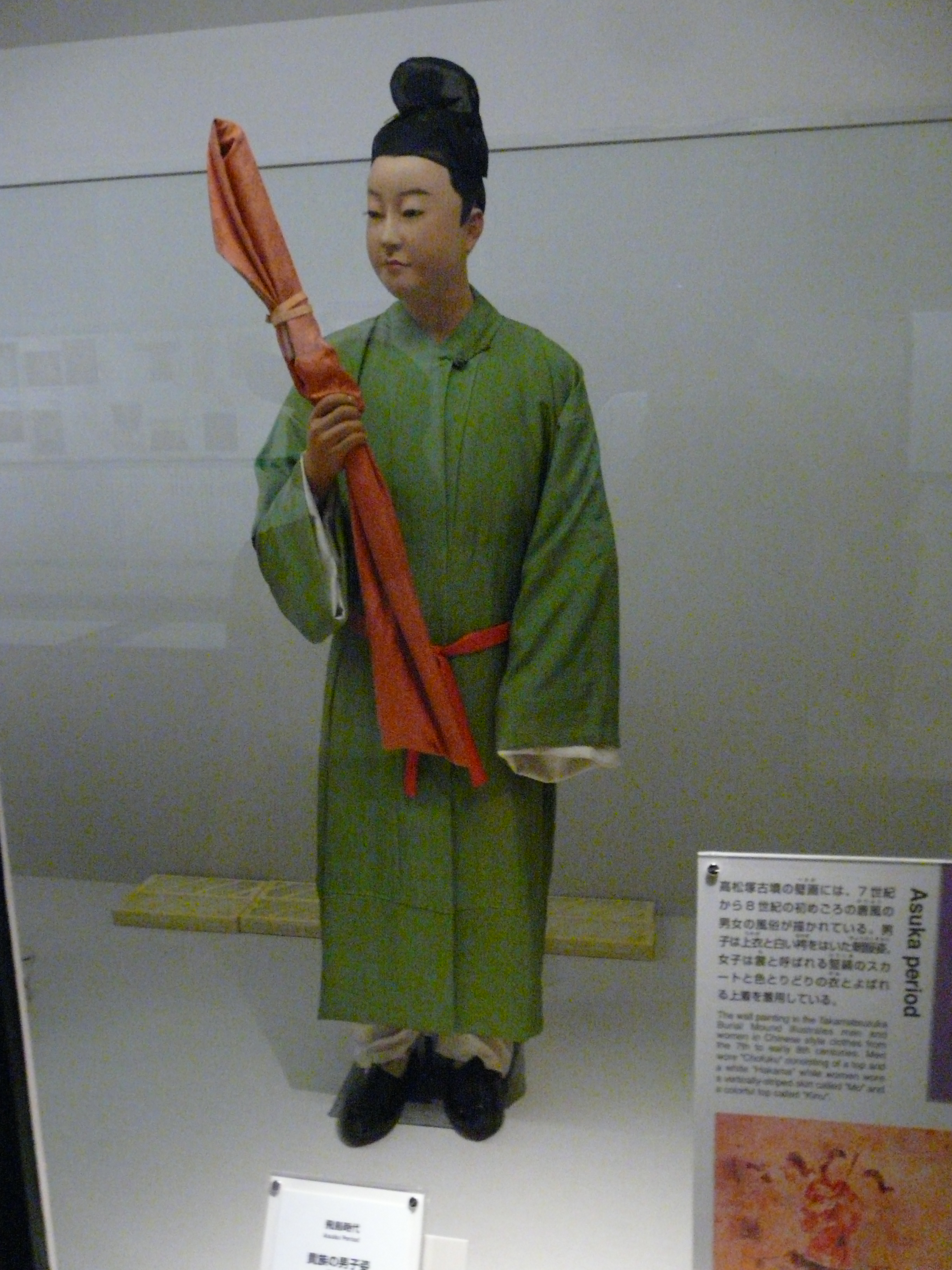
Asuka-period sleeves long enough to cover the wearer's hands.

Nara period (710–794 CE) painting of Kichijōten.

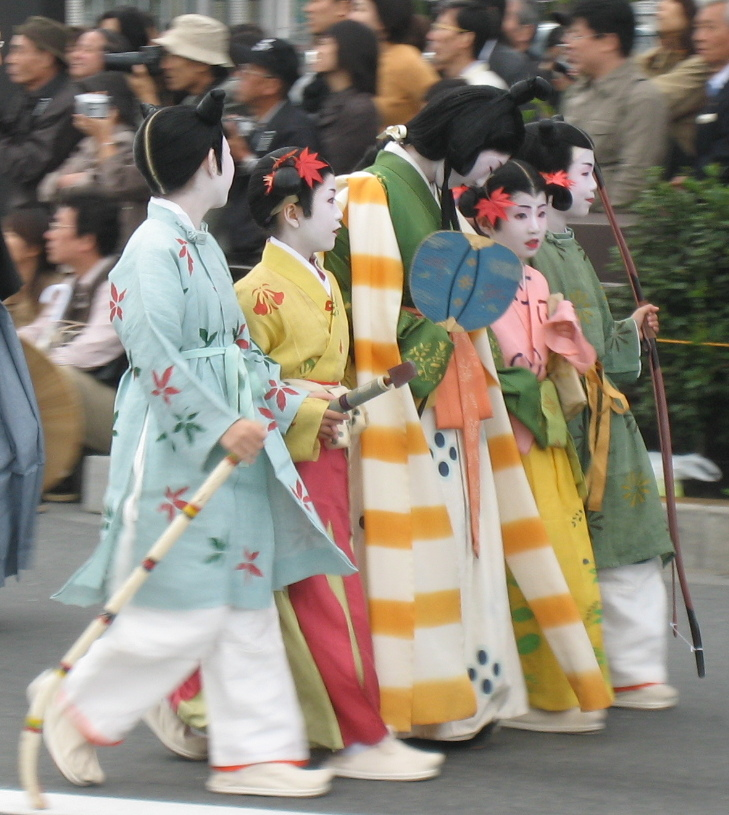
Jidai Matsuri participant (centre) dressed as Wake no Hiromushi (Nara period).

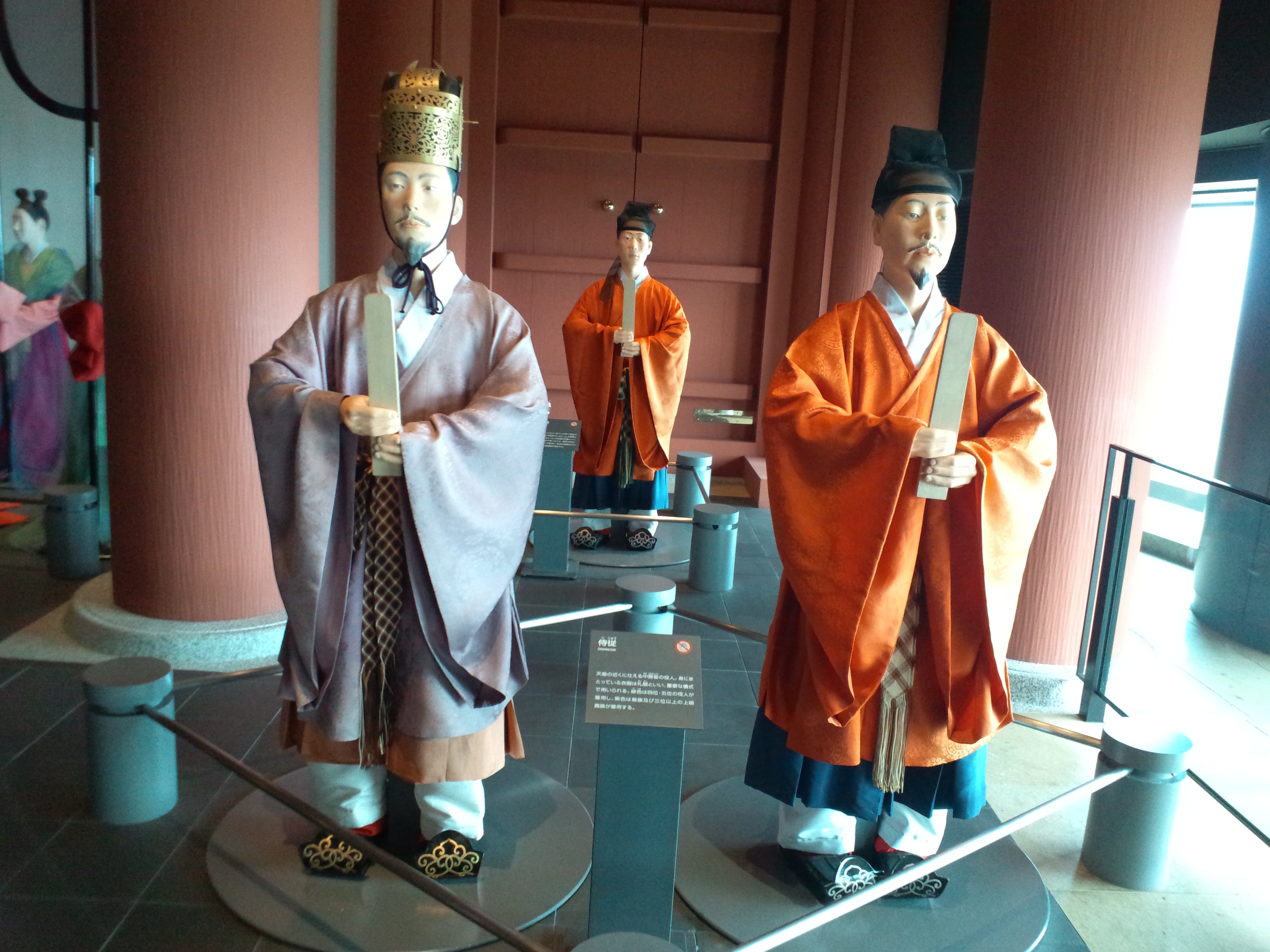
Nara-period court dress

=== Heian period to Azuchi–Momoyama period (794–1600) ===
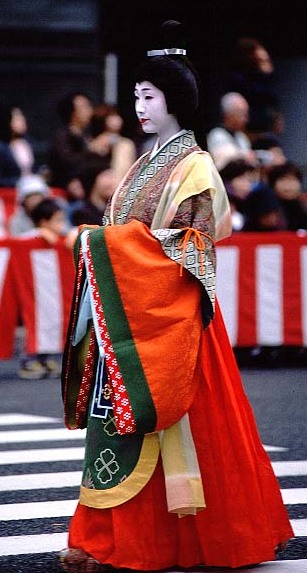
Jidai Matsuri participant dressed as Ono no Komachi (early Heian period).

During the Heian period (794–1193 CE), Japan stopped sending envoys to the Chinese dynastic courts. This prevented Chinese-imported goods—including clothing—from entering the Imperial Palace. This also prevented dissemination to the upper classes, who were the main arbiters of traditional Japanese culture at the time, and the only people allowed to wear such clothing. The ensuing cultural vacuum facilitated the development of a Japanese culture independent from Chinese fashions. Elements previously lifted from the Tang Dynastic courts developed independently into what is known literally as "national culture" or "kokufū culture" (国風文化, kokufū-bunka). The term is used to refer to Heian-period Japanese culture, particularly that of the upper classes.

Women's clothing in the imperial palace became increasingly stylised in the formal jūnihitoe, with some elements being abandoned by both male and female courtiers, such as the round-necked and tube-sleeved chun ju jacket worn by both genders in the early 7th century. Others, such as the wrapped front robes also worn by men and women, were kept. Some elements, such as the mo skirt worn by women, continued to in a reduced capacity, worn only to formal occasions; the mо̄ (裳) grew too narrow to wrap all the way around and became a trapezoidal pleated train. Hakama (trousers) became longer than the legs and also trailed behind the wearer.

During the later Heian period, various clothing edicts reduced the number of layers a woman could wear, leading to the kosode (lit. 'small sleeve') garment—previously considered underwear—becoming outerwear by the time of the Muromachi period (1336–1573 CE). Originally worn with hakama, the kosode began to be held closed with a small belt known as an obi instead. The kosode resembled a modern kimono, though at this time the sleeves were sewn shut at the back and were smaller in width (shoulder seam to cuff) than the body of the garment. During the Sengoku period (1467–1615) and the Azuchi–Momoyama period (1568–1600), the decoration of the kosode developed further, with bolder designs and flashy colours becoming popular. By this time, separate lower-body garments, such as the mō and hakama, were almost never worn, allowing full-length patterns to be seen.

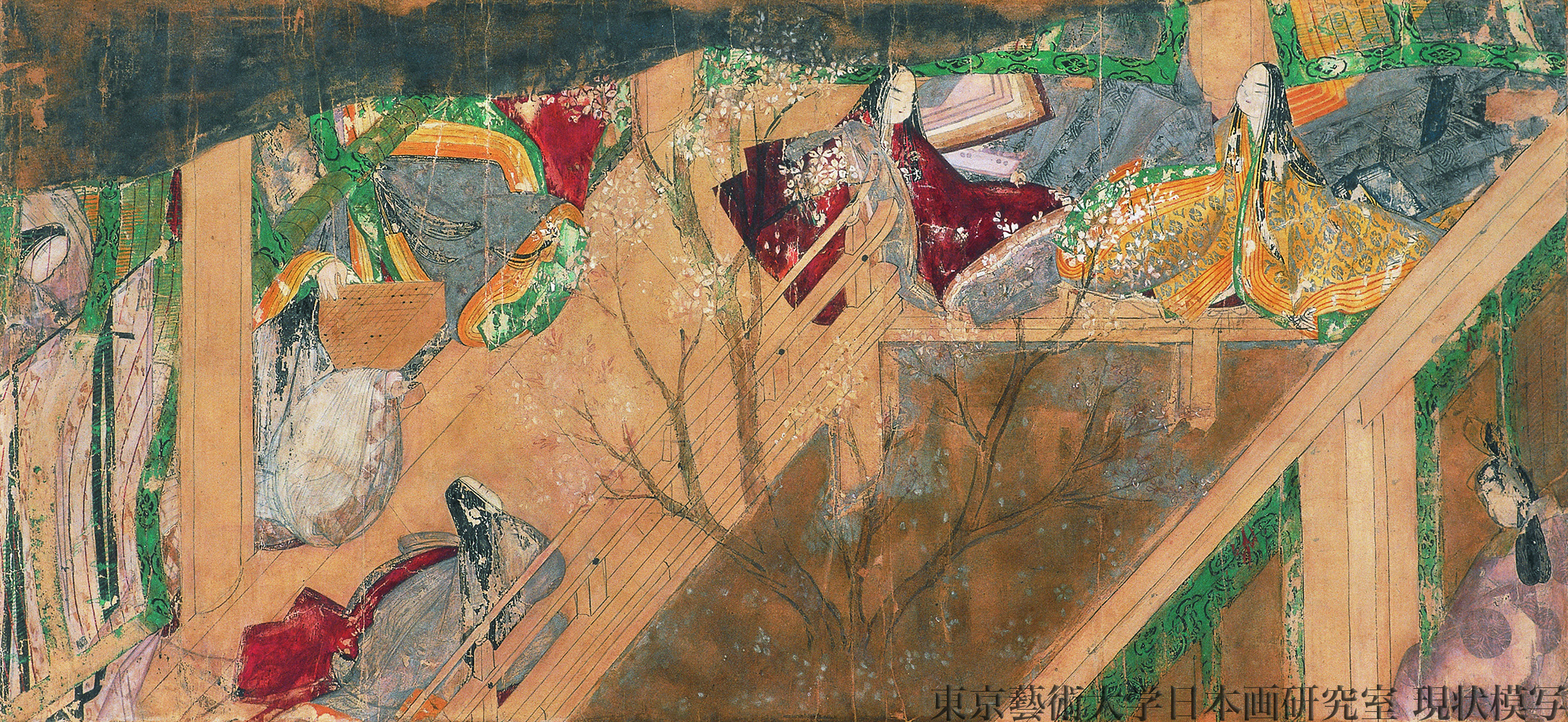
In the late Heian period, the jūnihitoe consisted of many layers (hitoe) worn over a plain kosode and hakama. (The Tale of Genji, 12th century)

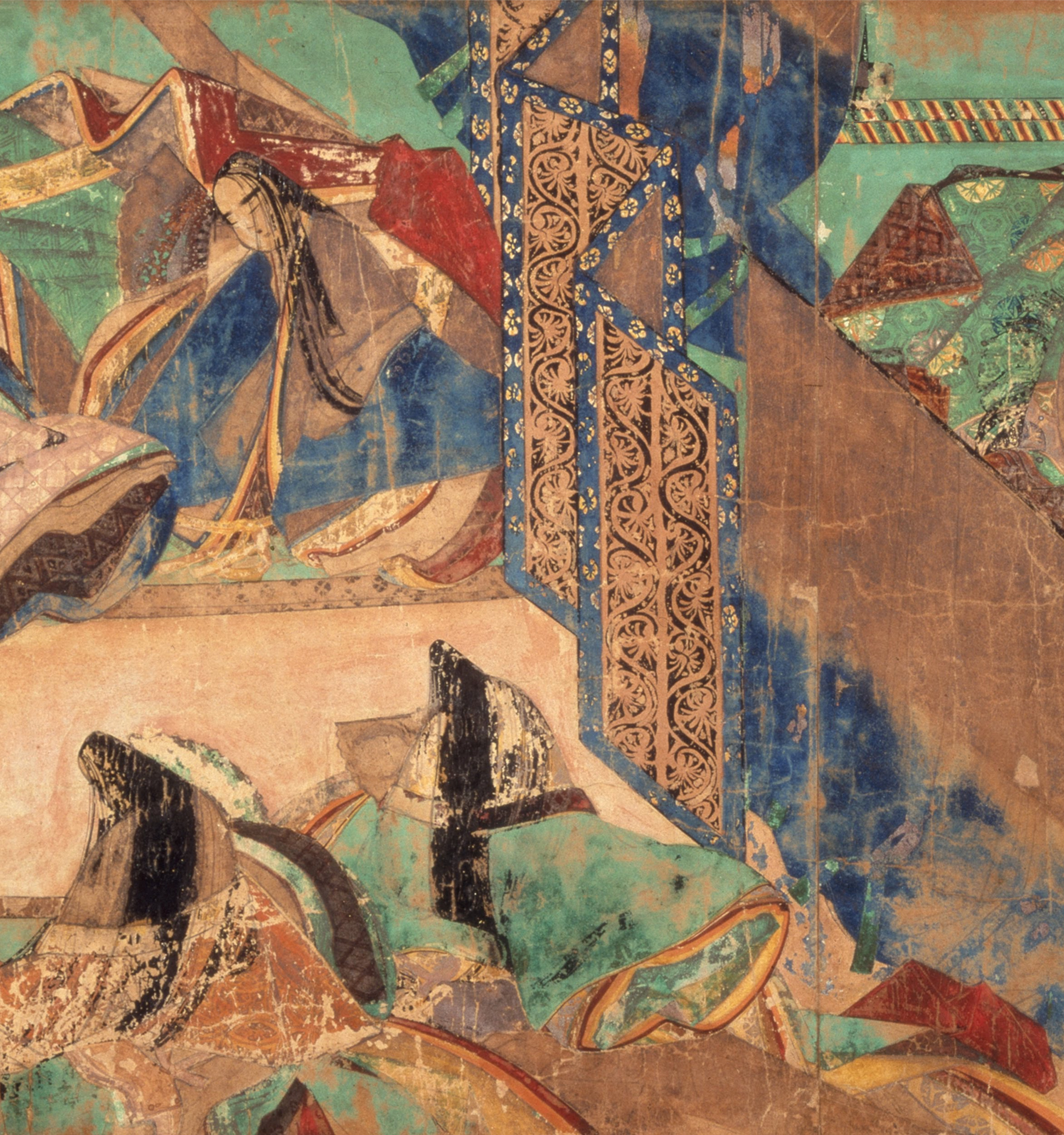
The courtiers in the foreground are wearing their hitoe off-the-shoulder, showing the kosode beneath.

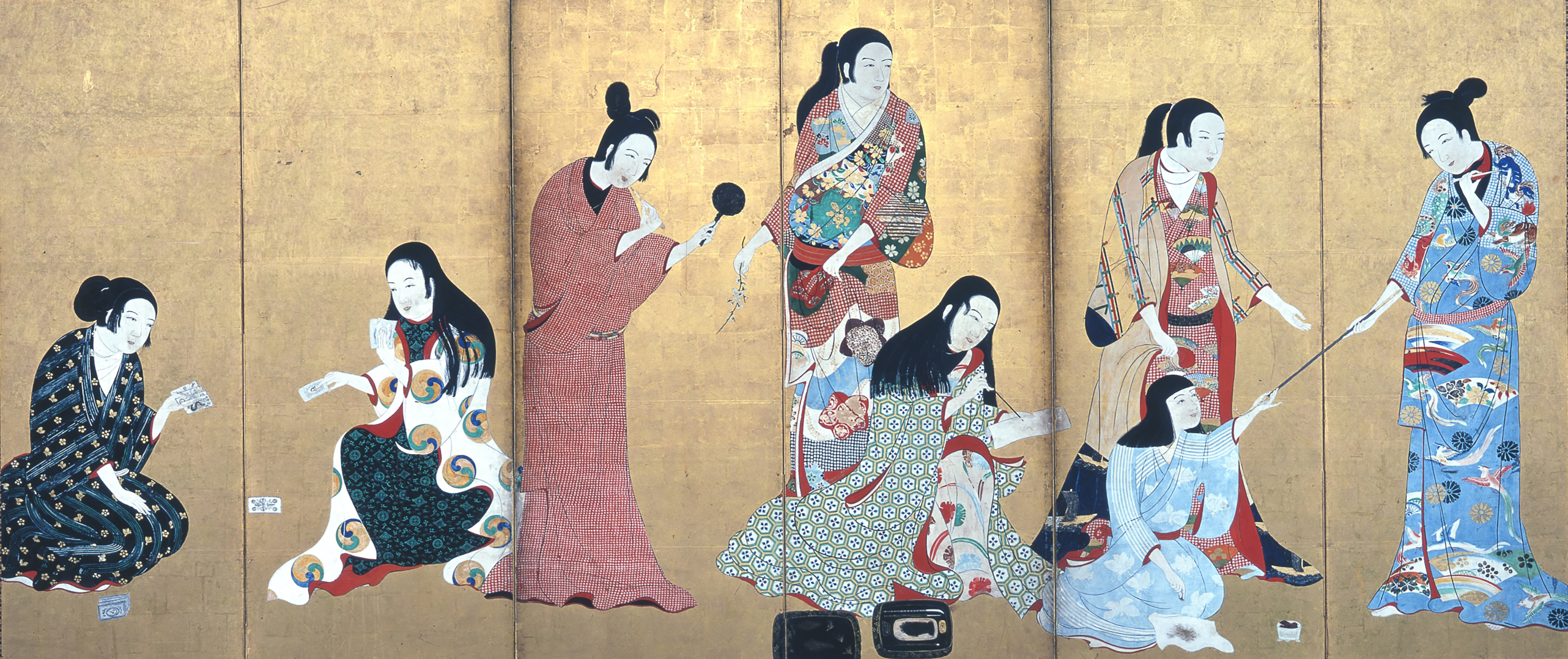
The kosode worn as outerwear. Note wider cut of the body, unisex narrow obi and shorter sleeves. Matsuura byōbu, c. 1650, Azuchi-Momoyama period.

=== Edo period (1603–1867) ===
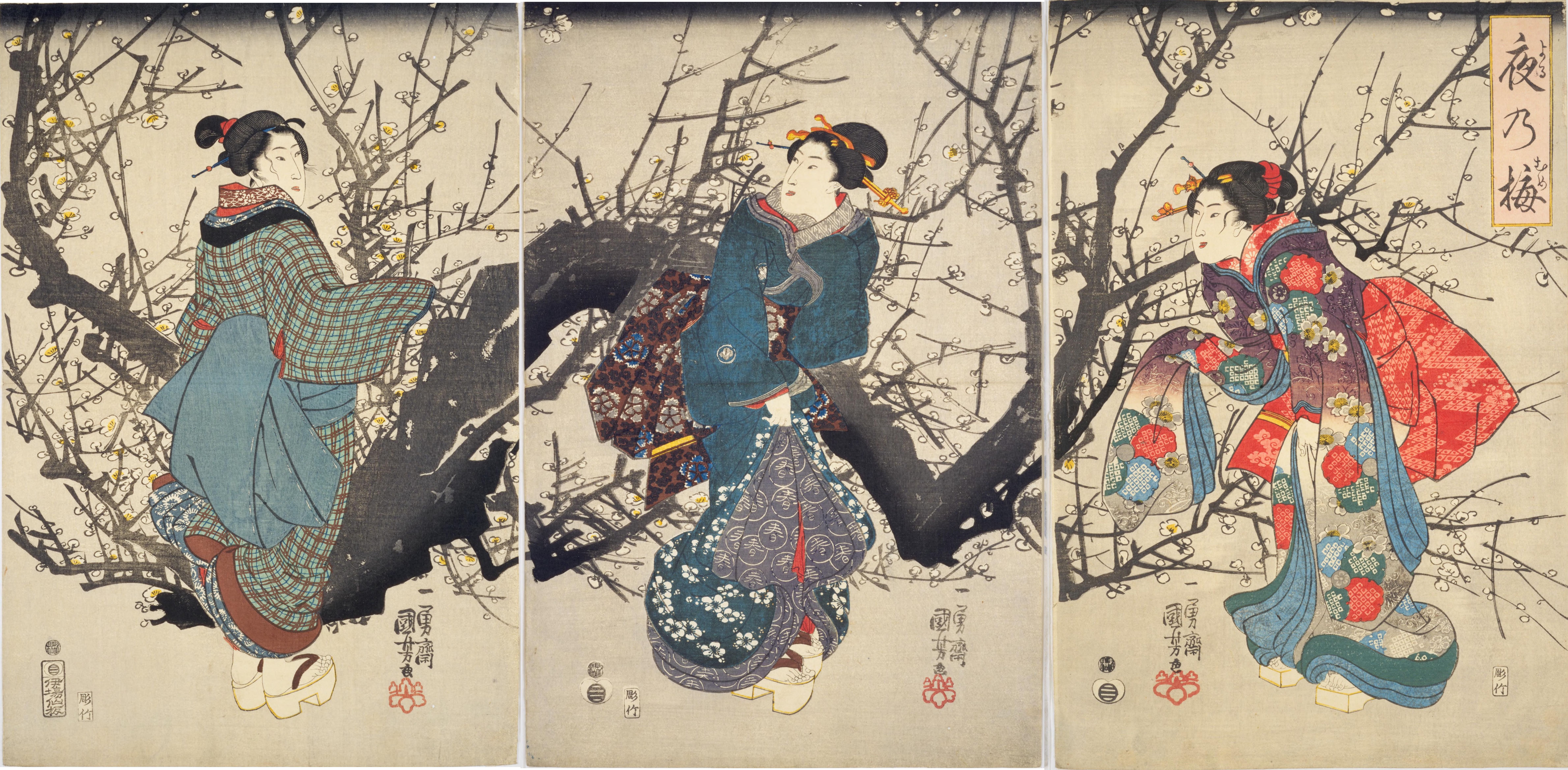
The overall silhouette of the kimono transformed during the Edo period due to the evolution of the obi, the sleeves, and the style of wearing multiple layered kimono. (Utagawa Kuniyoshi, Plum Blossoms at Night, woodblock print, 19th century)

During the Edo period (1603–1867 CE), both Japan's culture and economy developed significantly. A particular factor in the development of the Edo period was the early Genroku period (1688–1704 CE), wherein "Genroku culture" – luxurious displays of wealth and increased patronage of the arts – led to the further development of many art forms, including those of clothing. Genroku culture was led by the growing and increasingly-powerful merchant classes (chōnin), whose clothing was representative of their increasing economic power and rivalled the aristocracy and samurai classes, shown by their brightly coloured kimono that utilised expensive production techniques, such as hand-painted dyework. Rinzu, a damask fabric, also became the preferred material for kimono at this time, replacing the previously popular nerinuki plain-weave silk, which had been used to create tsujigahana.

In response to the increasing material wealth of the merchant classes, the Tokugawa shogunate issued sumptuary laws on kimono for the lower classes, prohibiting the use of purple or red fabric, gold embroidery, and the use of intricately dyed shibori patterns. As a result, a school of aesthetic thought known as Iki developed. They valued and prioritised the display of wealth through an almost mundane appearance, and the concept of kimono design and wear continues to this day as a major influence.

From this point onwards, the basic shape of both men's and women's kimonos remained largely unchanged. The sleeves of the kosode began to grow in length, especially amongst unmarried women, and the obi became much longer and wider, with various styles of knots coming into fashion, alongside stiffer weaves of material to support them.

In the Edo period, the kimono market was divided into craftspeople, who made the tanmono and accessories, tonya, or wholesalers, and retailers.

=== Modern period ===
==== Meiji period (1868–1912) ====
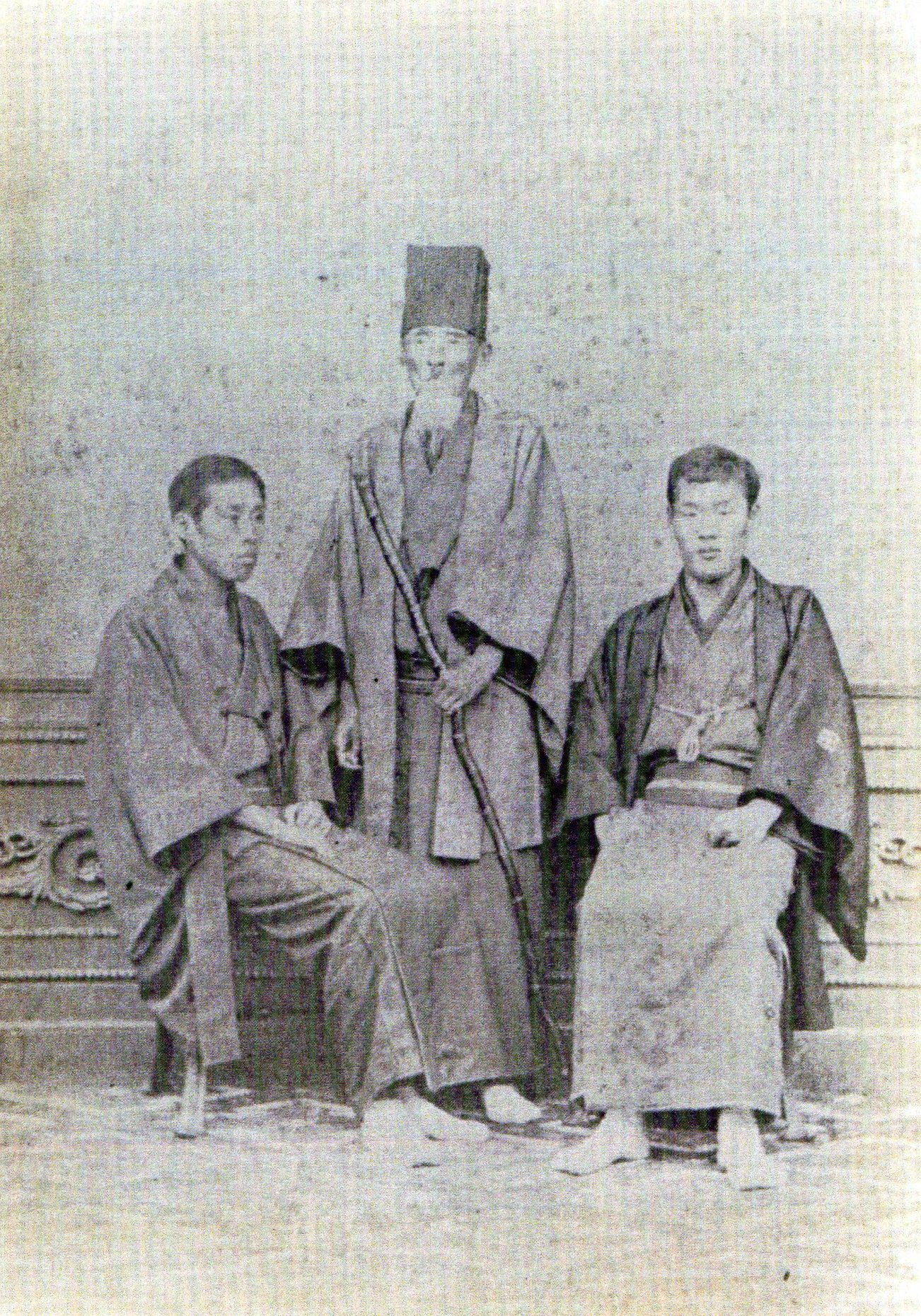
Part of the Ootuki family in kimono, 1874

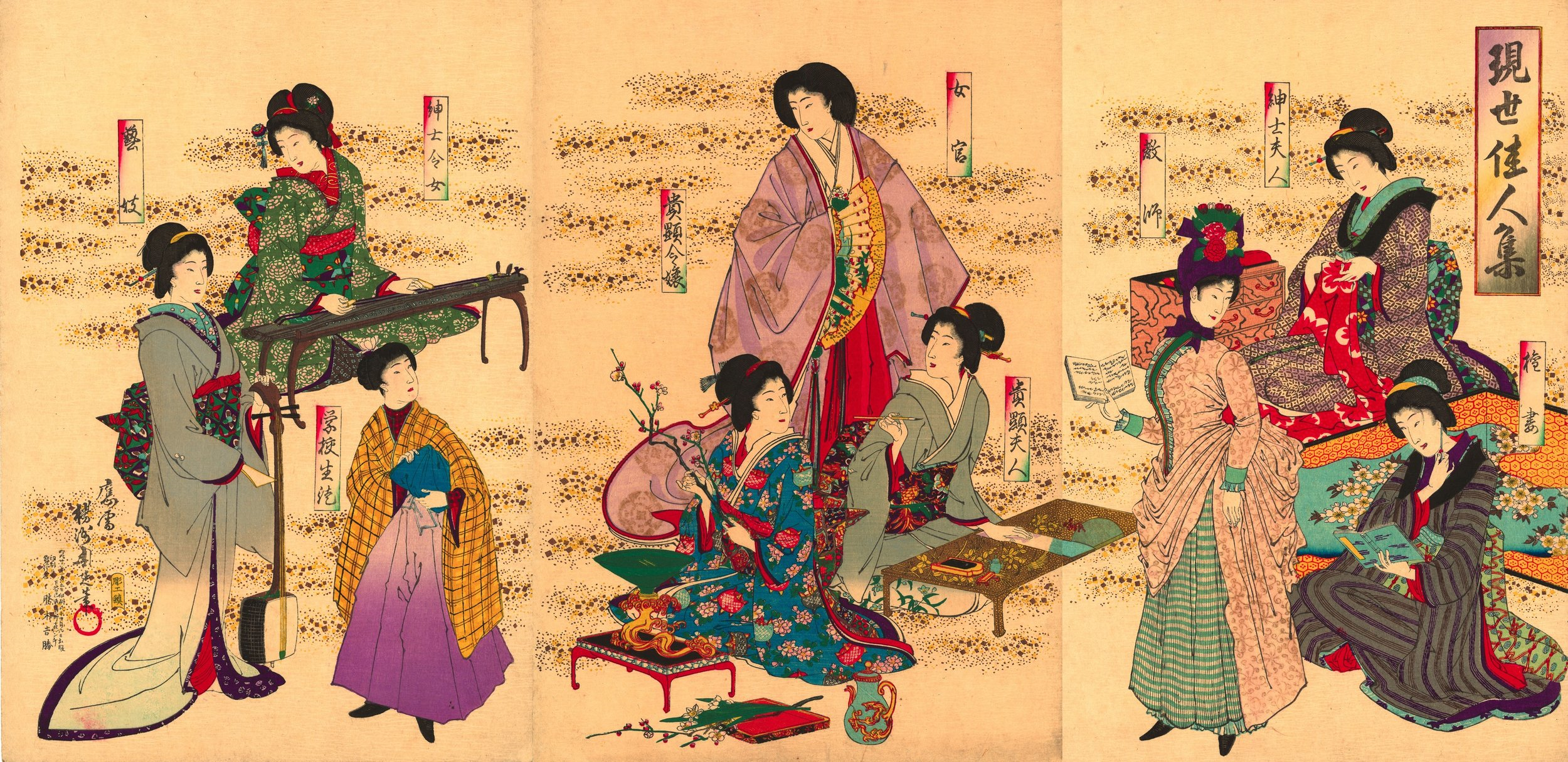
Assorted types of kimono, Western dress, a court lady in keiko, and a schoolgirl in a high-collared shirt, kimono and hakama. All wear both purple and red. 1890.

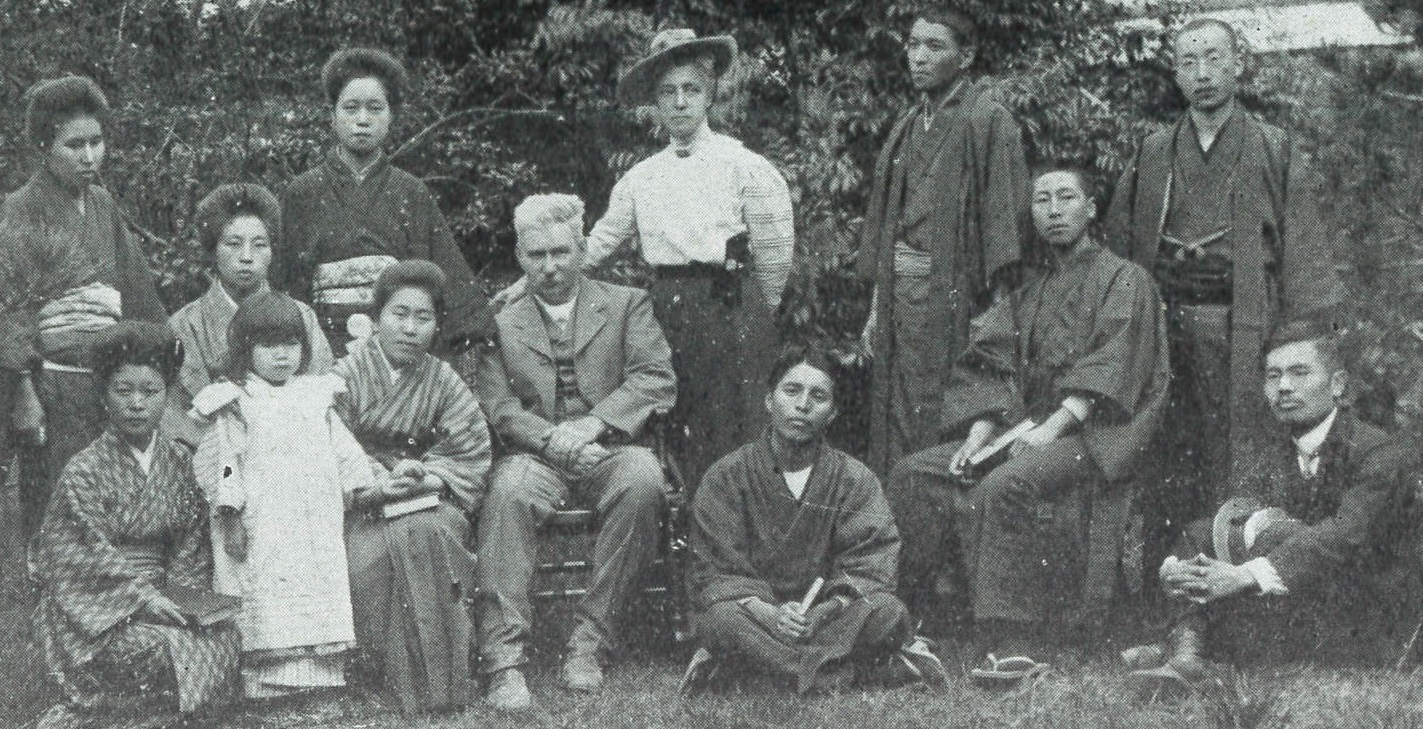
Family of Horiai Setsuko, May 1912, some in European dress, some in kimono, some wearing hakama. Women's hakama spread from the court as part of Japanese reform dress.

In 1869, the social class system was abolished after years of isolated and feudal rule. With the social class changes came class-specific sumptuary laws. Kimonos with formerly-restricted elements, such as red and purple colours, became popular, particularly with the advent of synthetic dyes such as mauvine.

Following the opening of Japan's borders in the early Meiji period to Western trade, new materials and techniques – such as wool and the use of synthetic dyestuffs – became popular, with casual wool kimonos being relatively common in pre-1960s Japan; the use of safflower dye (beni) for silk linings fabrics (known as momi; literally, "red silk") was also common in pre-1960s Japan, making kimonos from this era easily identifiable.

During the Meiji period, the opening of Japan to Western trade after the enclosure of the Edo period led to a drive towards Western dress as a sign of modernity. Textiles became a main staple and powerhouse of the Japanese economy. In 1871, Western clothing was adopted by both policemen and mailmen. After an edict by Emperor Meiji in the same year, the court, courtiers and bureaucrats moved to wearing Western clothing within their job roles, with the adoption of Western clothing by men in Japan happening at a much greater pace than by women. Following the trend of other positions, 1872 saw railway workers transitioning to Western clothing. It was not until 1877 until an edict similar to the one given by Emperor Meiji, was put in place by Empress Haruko for women. Initiatives such as the Tokyo Women's & Children's Wear Manufacturers' Association (東京婦人子供服組合) promoted Western dress as everyday clothing.

==== Taishō period (1912–1926) ====
Western clothing quickly became standard issue as army uniform for men and school uniform for boys, and between 1920 and 1930, the fuku sailor outfit replaced the kimono and undivided hakama as school uniform for girls. However, kimono still remained popular as an item of everyday fashion; following the Great Kantō Earthquake of 1923, cheap, informal and ready-to-wear meisen kimono, woven from raw and waste silk threads unsuitable for other uses, became highly popular, following the loss of many people's possessions. By 1930, ready-to-wear meisen kimono had become highly popular for their bright, seasonally changing designs, many of which took inspiration from the Art Deco movement. Meisen kimonos were usually dyed using the ikat (kasuri) technique of dyeing, where either warp or both warp and weft threads (known as heiyō-gasuri) were dyed using a stencil pattern before weaving.

It was during the Taishō period that the modern formalisation of kimono and kimono types began to emerge. The Meiji period had seen the slow introduction of kimono types that mediated between the informal and the most formal, a trend that continued throughout the Taishō period, as social occasions and opportunities for leisure increased under the abolition of class distinctions. As Western clothing increased in popularity for men as everyday clothing, the kimono industry further established its own traditions of formal and informal dress for women; this saw the invention of the hōmongi, divisions of tomesode (short-sleeved) kimono for women, and montsuki hakama. The bridal kimono trousseau (oyomeiri dōgu), an uncommon practice of the upper classes in the Edo period, also became common throughout the middle classes; traditions of kimono bridalwear for marriage ceremonies were also codified in this time, which resembled the bridalwear of samurai-class women. Standards of kitsuke at this time began to slowly graduate to a more formalised, neatened appearance, with a flat, uniform ohashori and a smooth, uncreased obi, which also resembled the "proper" kitsuke of upper-class women. However, kitsuke standards were still relatively informal, and would not become formalised until after World War II.

==== Shōwa period (1926–1989) ====
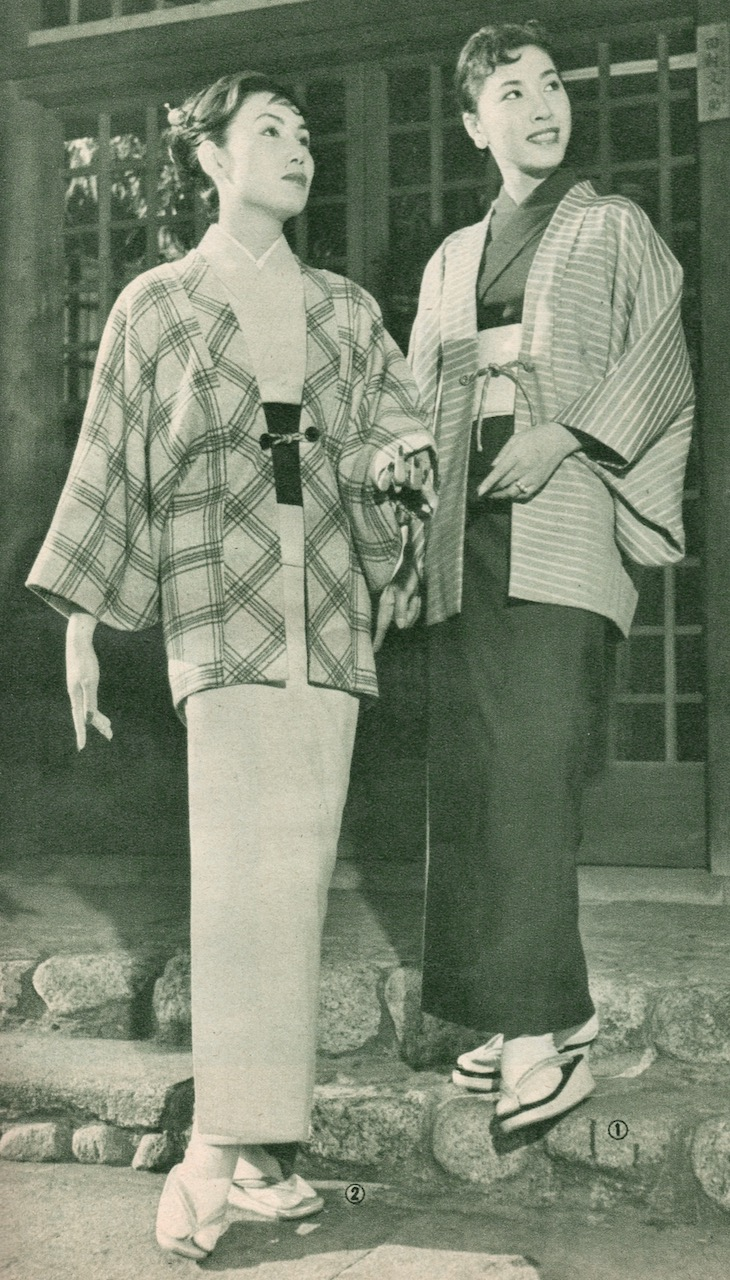
A 1957 clothing ad, showing postwar kitsuke standards for women, which promoted a neater, more standardised appearance

While kimonos were no longer common wear for men, they remained everyday wear for Japanese women until World War II (1940–1945). Though the Taishō period had seen a number of invented traditions, standards of kitsuke (dressing) were still not as formalised in this time, with creases, uneven ohashori and crooked obi still deemed acceptable.

During the war, kimono factories shut down, and the government encouraged people to wear monpe (also romanised as mompe) – trousers constructed from old kimono – instead. Fibres such as rayon became widespread during WWII, being inexpensive to produce and cheap to buy, and typically featured printed designs. Cloth rationing persisted until 1951, so most kimonos were made at home from repurposed fabrics.

In the second half of the 20th century, the Japanese economy boomed, and silk became cheaper, making it possible for the average family to afford silk kimono. The kimono retail industry had developed an elaborate codification of rules for kimono-wearing, with types of kimono, levels of formality, and rules on seasonality, which intensified after the war; there had previously been rules about kimono-wearing, but these were not rigidly codified and varied by region and class. Formalisation sought perfection, with no creases or unevenness in the kimono, and an increasingly tubular figure was promoted as the ideal for women in kimono. The kimono-retail industry promoted a sharp distinction between Japanese and Western clothes; for instance, wearing Western shoes with Japanese clothing (while common in the Taishō period) was codified as improper; these rules on proper dressing are often described in Japanese using the English phrase "Time, Place, and Occasion" (TPO). As neither Japanese men or women commonly wore kimono, having grown up under wartime auspices, commercial kitsuke schools were set up to teach women how to don kimono. Men in this period rarely wore kimono, and menswear thus escaped most of the formalisation.).

Kimonos were promoted as essential for ceremonial occasions; for instance, the expensive furisode worn by young women for Seijinshiki was deemed a necessity. Bridal trousseaus containing tens of kimono of every possible subtype were promoted as de rigueur, and parents felt obliged to provide kimono trousseaus that cost up to 10 million yen (~£70,000), which were displayed and inspected publicly as part of the wedding, including being transported in transparent trucks.

By the 1970s, formal kimonos formed the vast majority of kimono sales. Kimono retailers, due to the pricing structure of brand new kimono, had developed a relative monopoly on not only prices but a perception of kimono knowledge, allowing them to dictate prices and promote more formal (and expensive) purchases, as selling a single formal kimono could support the seller comfortably for three months. The kimono industry peaked in 1975, with total sales of 2.8 trillion yen (~£18 billion). The sale of informal brand new kimono was largely neglected.

==== Heisei period (1989–2019) ====
The economic collapse of the 1990s bankrupted much of the kimono industry and ended a number of expensive practices. The rules for how to wear kimonos lost their previous hold over the industry, and formerly-expensive traditions such as bridal kimono trousseaus generally disappeared, and when still given, were much less extensive. It was during this time that it became acceptable and even preferred for women to wear Western dress to ceremonial occasions like weddings and funerals. Many women had dozens or even hundreds of kimonos, mostly unworn, in their homes; a secondhand kimono, even if unworn, would sell for about 500 yen (less than £3.50; about US$5), a few per cent of the bought-new price. In the 1990s and early 2000s, many secondhand kimono shops opened as a result of this.

In the early years of the 21st century, the cheaper and simpler yukata became popular with young people. Around 2010, men began wearing kimonos again in situations other than their own wedding, and kimonos were again promoted and worn as everyday dress by a small minority.

==== Reiwa period (2019–present) ====
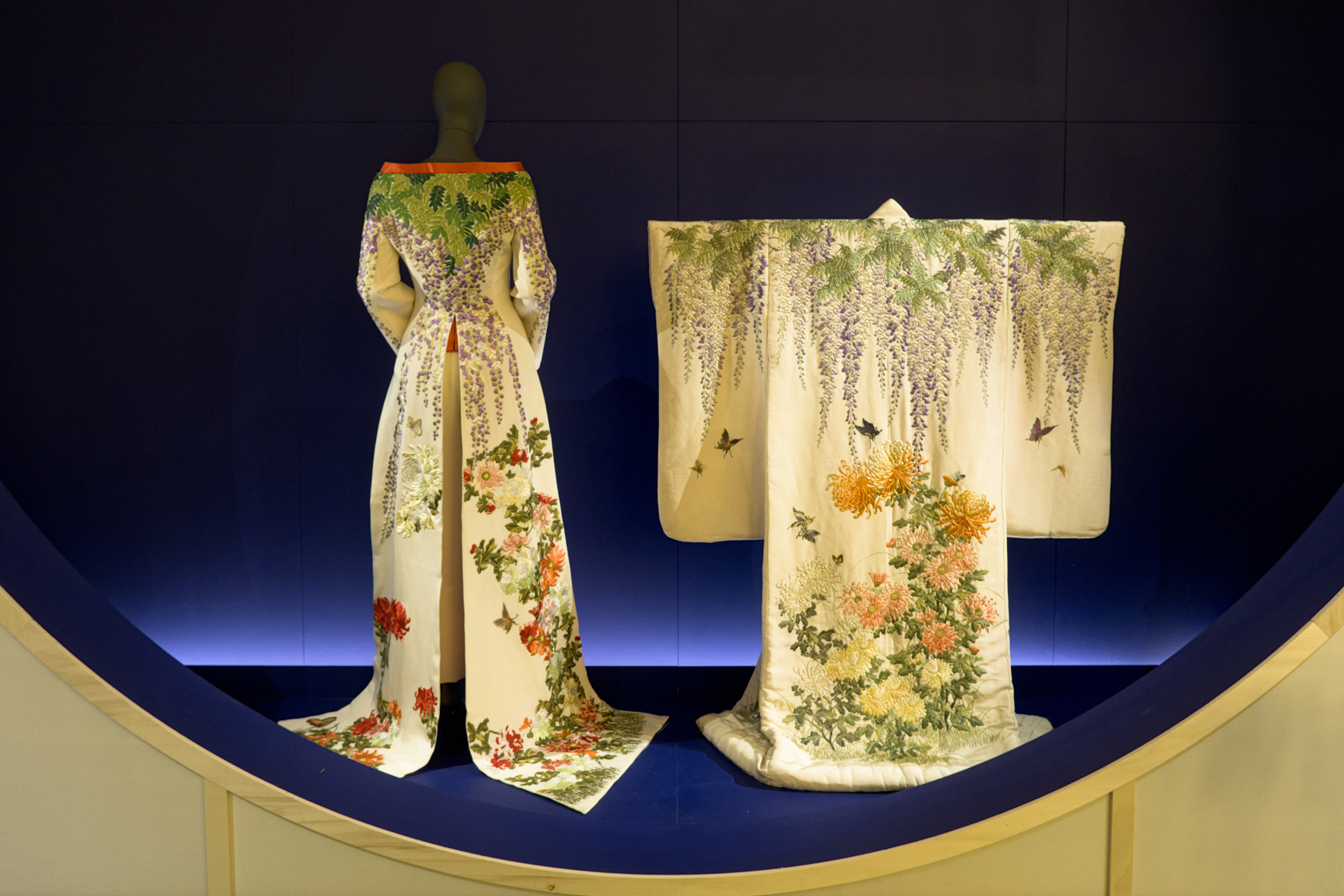
Kimono-inspired trouser suit, Kimono: Kyoto to Catwalk exhibition, Victoria and Albert Museum, Dundee (2024)

Today, the majority of people in Japan wear Western clothing as everyday attire, and are most likely to wear kimonos either to formal occasions such as wedding ceremonies and funerals, or to summer events, where the standard kimono is the easy-to-wear, single-layer cotton yukata.

In 2019, the mayor of Kyoto announced that his staff were working to register "Kimono Culture" on UNESCO's intangible cultural heritage list.

In 2020, the Victoria and Albert museum staged an exhibition called Kimono: Kyoto to Catwalk, a "collection of around 300 garments, accessories, paintings, prints, photographs and film clips" relating to the history of the Kimono from the 17th century to the present. The final instalment of the exhibition's four-year international tour was at the V&A Dundee in 2024.

== Textiles ==
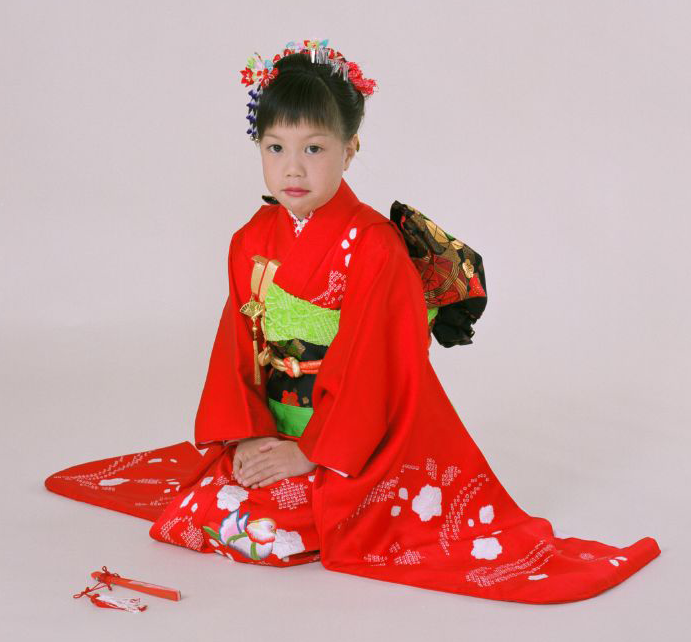
A child wearing a furisode kimono in full formal dress

Both kimono and obi are made from a wide variety of fibre types, including hemp, linen, silk, Japanese crêpe (known as chirimen), and figured damask weaves (rinzu). Fabrics are typically – for both obi and kimono – woven as tanmono (bolts of narrow width), save for certain types of obi (such as the maru obi), woven to double-width. Formal kimonos are almost always made from silk, with thicker, heavier, stiff or matte fabrics generally being considered informal.

Modern kimonos are widely available in fabrics considered easier to care for, such as polyester. Kimono linings are typically silk or imitation silk, and often match the top fabric in fibre type, though the lining of some casual silk kimono may be cotton, wool or linen.

=== Kimono motifs ===
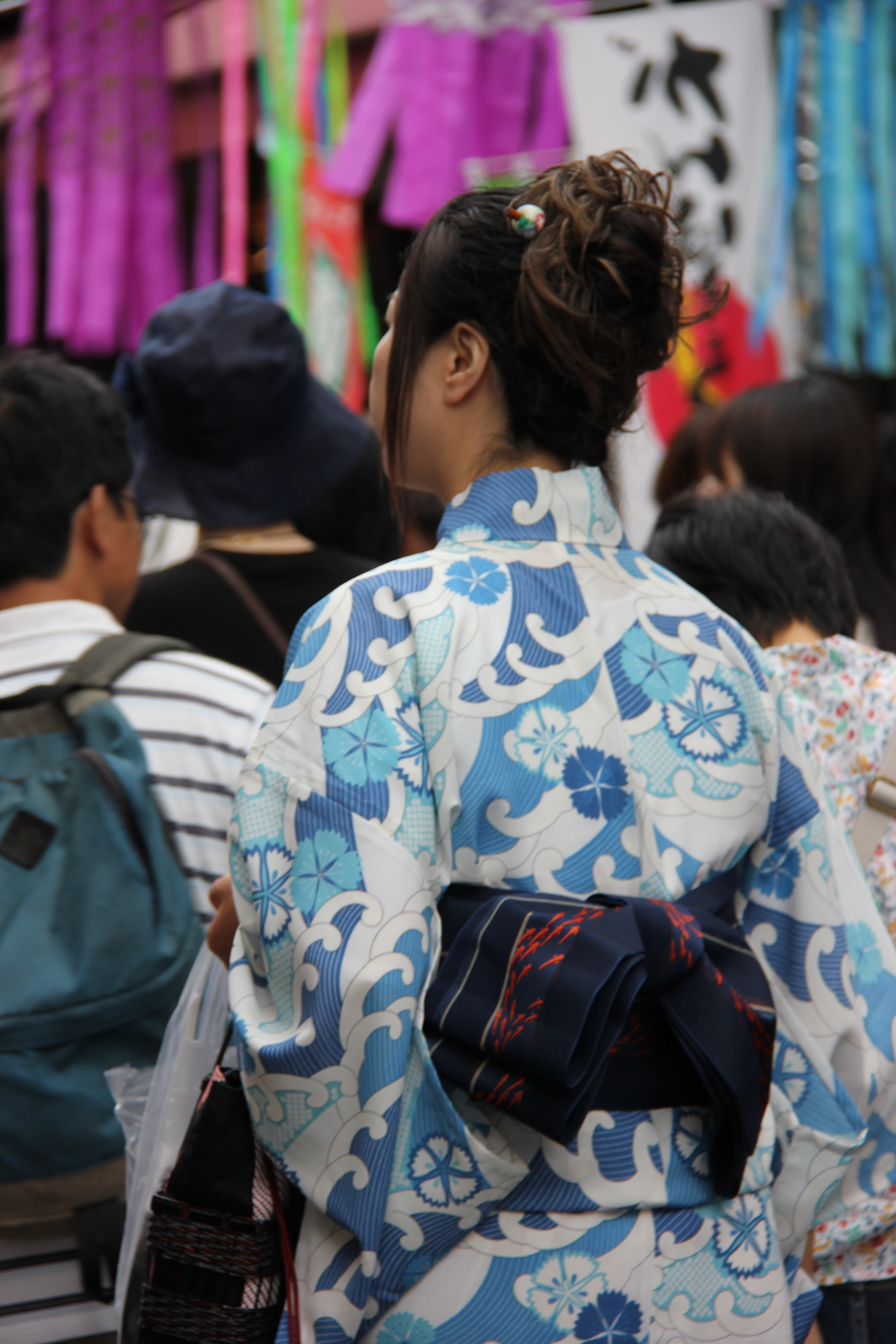
A modern yukata machine-dyed with a nadeshiko pattern, a September motif

Kimono fabrics are often decorated, sometimes by hand, before construction. Customarily, kimono with woven patterns are considered more informal, though for obi, the reverse is true, with obi featuring dyed patterns being less formal than obi with woven patterns. Though kimono fabrics with woven patterns are typically not especially heavy and can be lightweight, obi fabrics with woven patterns are often very heavy, with many formal obi being made from thickly-woven brocade. Traditionally, woven kimonos are paired with obi that are decorated with dyed patterns, and vice versa. However, for all but the most formal kimono, this is more of a general suggestion than a strict rule. Formal kimonos are typically decorated with dyed patterns, commonly found along the hemline. These patterns may feature embroidery in parts, couched gold and silver thread, and/or gold and silver foil. The layout of motifs can denote a kimono's age, with patterns that mirror along the vertical back seam (ryōzuma) being typical for kimono made before the 1930s.

Many kimono motifs are seasonal, and denote the season in which the kimono can be worn; however, some motifs have no season and can be worn all-year round. Others, such as the combination of pine, plum and bamboo – a grouping referred to as the Three Friends of Winter – are auspicious, and thus worn to formal occasions for the entire year. Motifs seen on yukata are commonly seasonal motifs worn out of season, either to denote the spring just passed or the desire for cooler autumn or winter temperatures. Colour also contributes to the seasonality of the kimono, with some seasons – such as autumn – generally favouring warmer, darker colours over lighter, cooler ones.

A number of different guides on seasonal kimono motifs exist, with some guides – such as those for tea ceremony in particular – being especially stringent on their reflection of the seasons. Motifs typically represent the flora, fauna, landscape or culture of Japan; one such example is cherry blossoms, a famously seasonal motif worn in spring until just before the actual cherry blossoms begin to bloom, it being considered unlucky to try and 'compete' with the cherries. Motifs are typically worn a few weeks before the official 'start' of any given season, as it is considered fashionable to anticipate the coming season.

Though men's kimonos historically displayed just as much decoration and variety as women's, in the modern era, the principal distinction of men's kimonos in terms of seasonality and occasion is the fabric. The typical men's kimono is a subdued, dark colour; black, dark blues, greens and browns are common. Fabrics are usually matte, in contrast to the occasional satin weaves of some women's kimonos. Some men's kimonos have a subtle pattern, and textured fabrics are more common in informal men's kimono. Informal men's styles may also feature slightly brighter colours, such as lighter purples, greens and blues. Sumo wrestlers have occasionally been known to wear quite bright colours, such as fuchsia, in their kimonos, which they are required to wear when appearing in public.

=== Terms ===
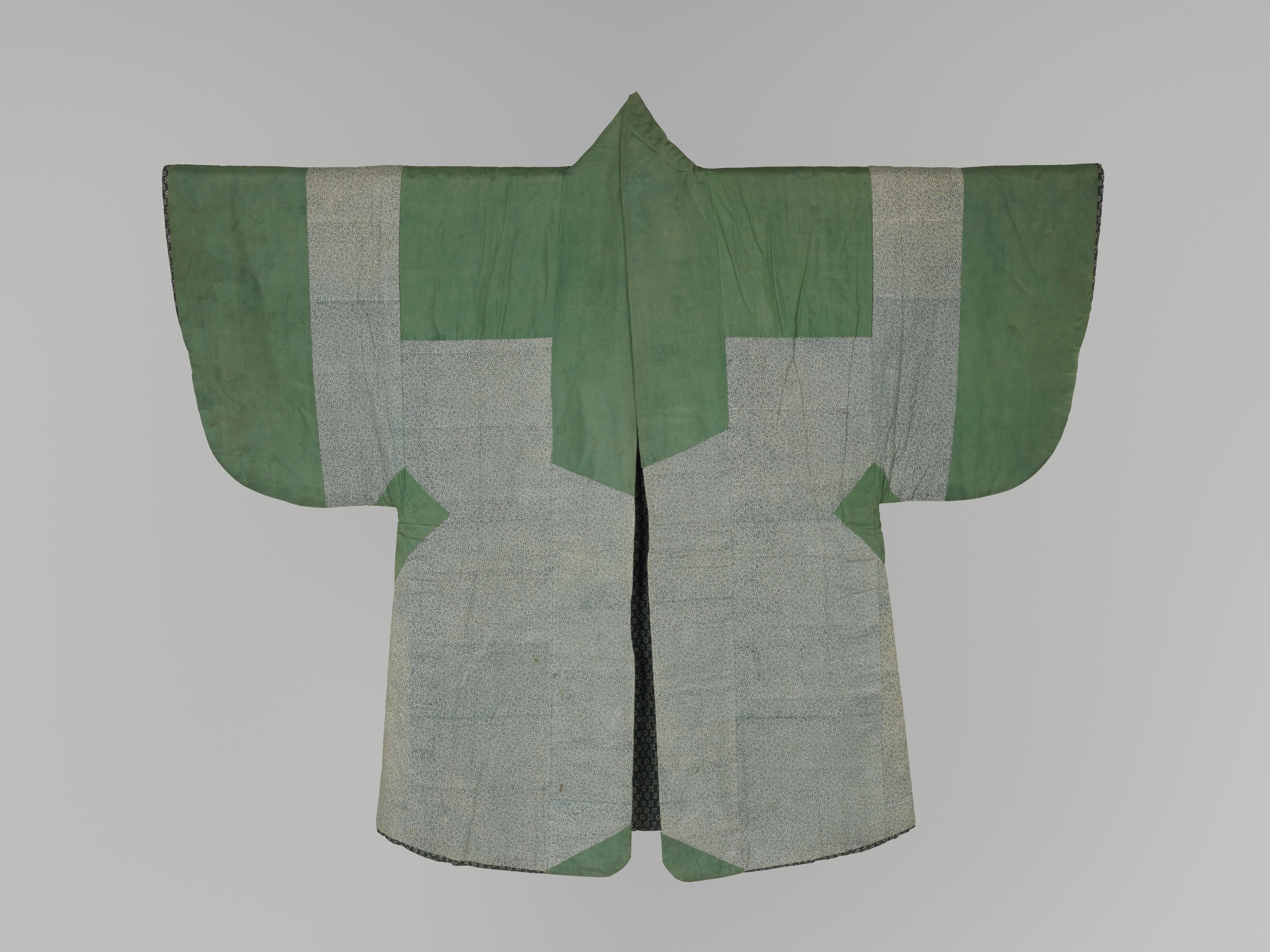
Patchwork haori for tea ceremony (chabaori), c. 1800; the areas likely to have been damaged are made in another colour. Paper and silk.

The fabrics that kimonos are made from are classified in two categories within Japan. Gofuku (呉服) is the term used to indicate silk kimono fabrics, composed of the characters go (呉, the Japanese pronunciation of "Wu"), referring to the State of Wu in ancient China where silk weaving technology developed, and fuku (服, meaning "clothing").

The term gofuku is used to refer to kimonos in general within Japan, particularly within the context of the kimono industry, as traditional kimono shops are called either gofukuten (呉服店) or gofukuya (呉服屋) – with the additional character of ya (屋) meaning 'shop'.

Cotton and hemp fabrics are referred to generally as futomono (太物), meaning "thick materials", with both cotton and hemp yarns being considerably thicker than silk yarns used for weaving. Cotton kimonos are specifically referred to in the context of materials as momenfuku (木綿服), "cotton clothes", whereas hemp kimonos are known as asafuku (麻服), "hemp clothes", in Japanese, with the character for hemp – asa (麻) – also being used widely for hemp, linen and ramie kimono fabrics.

==== Merchants' terms ====
Until the end of the Edo period, the tailoring of both gofuku and futomono fabrics was separated, with silk kimonos handled at shops known as gofuku dana, and kimonos of other fibres sold at shops known as futomono dana. Stores that handled all types of fabric were known as gofuku futomono dana, though after the Meiji period, stores only retailing futomono kimonos became less profitable in the face of cheaper everyday Western clothing, and eventually went out of business, leaving only gofuku stores to sell kimonos – leading to kimono shops becoming known only as gofukuya today.

=== Reuse ===
Kimonos can readily be resized, or unpicked back into tanmono (bolt) lengths.

Outside of being re-woven into new fabrics, worn-out kimono have historically been recycled in a variety of ways, depending on the type of kimono and its original use. When the cloth is worn out, it may be used as fabric for smaller items or to create boroboro (patchwork) kimonos (which were also sometimes made for the sake of fashion). The fact that the pattern pieces of a kimono consist of rectangles, and not complex shapes, make reuse in garments or other items easier. Sashiko are used to hold cloth together and decorate it. The cloth used for patchwork clothing must all be of similar weight, drape, and handle.

Formal kimonos, made of expensive and thin silk fabrics, would have been re-sewn into children's kimonos when they became unusable for adults, as they were typically unsuitable for practical clothing; kimonos were shortened, with the okumi taken off and the collar re-sewn to create haori, or were simply cut at the waist to create a side-tying jacket. After marriage or a certain age, young women would shorten the sleeves of their kimonos; the excess fabric would be used as a furoshiki (wrapping cloth), could be used to lengthen the kimono at the waist, or could be used to create a patchwork undergarment known as a dōnuki. Kimono that were in better condition could be re-used as an under-kimono, or to create a false underlayer known as a hiyoku.

Children also traditionally wore kataire, kimono made of a fancier material in the okumi and upper back.

== Construction ==
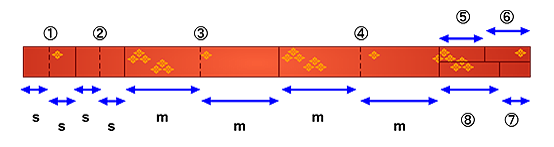
Cutting a kimono from a tanmono

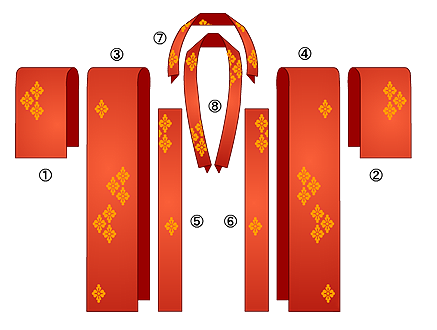
How a kimono is assembled from pieces cut from a tanmono

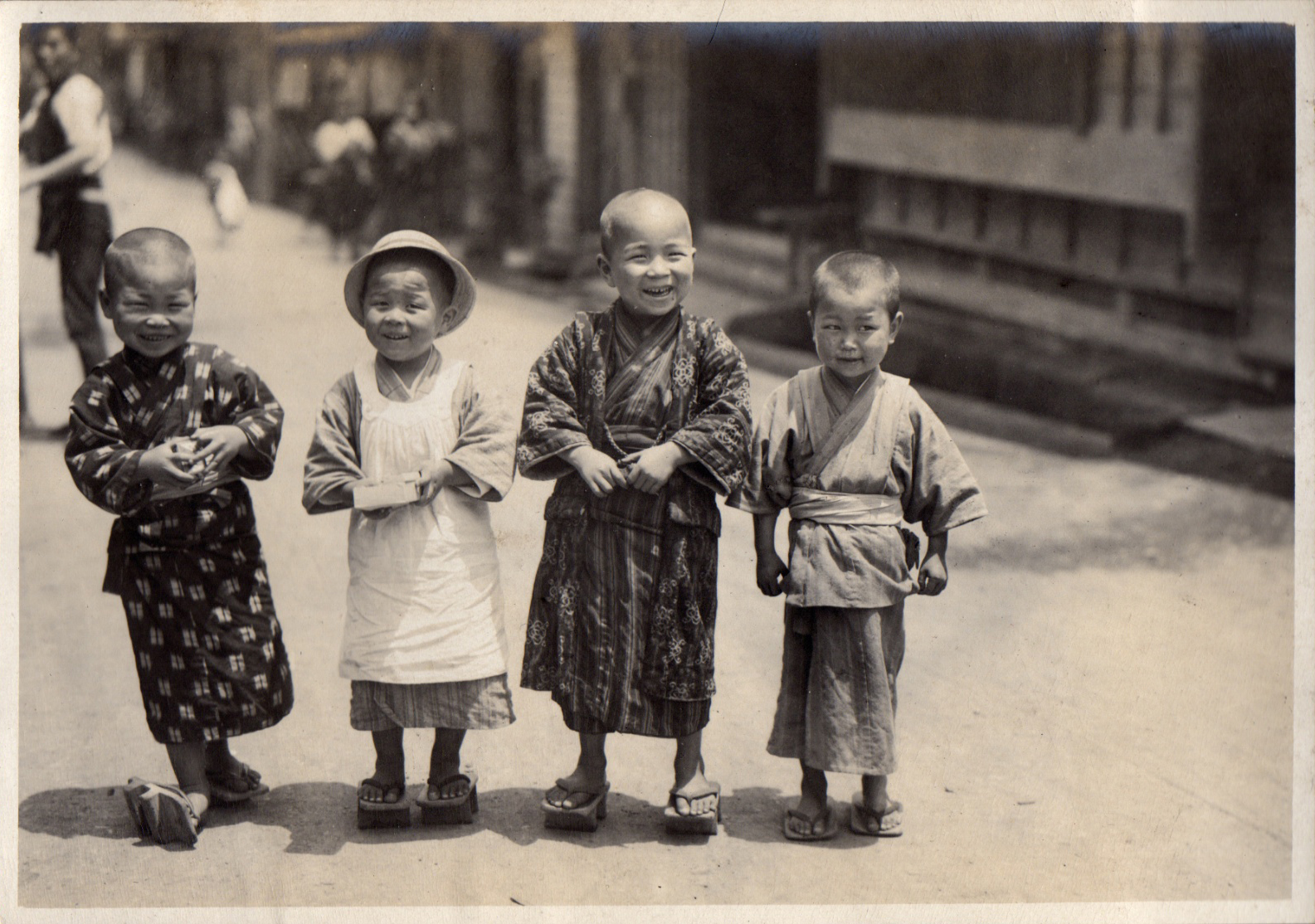
The hatless child in the pale kimono most clearly shows the shoulder tucks and hip overfold used to adjust size.

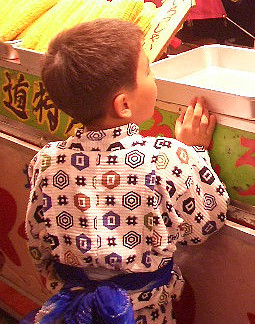
Kata-nuiage, shoulder tucks to adjust size for children

Kimonos are traditionally made from a single bolt of fabric known as a tanmono, which is roughly 11.5 metres (38 ft) long and 36 centimetres (14 in) wide for women, and 12.5 metres (41 ft) long and 42 centimetres (17 in) wide for men. The entire bolt is used to make one kimono, and some men's tanmono are woven to be long enough to create a matching haori jacket and juban as well. Kimono linings are made from bolts of the same width.

Some custom bolts of fabric are produced for especially tall or heavy people, such as sumo wrestlers, who must have kimono custom-made by either joining multiple bolts, weaving custom-width fabric, or using non-standard size fabric. For children, in the early 1900s, shorter lengths were used, and sometimes the body of the kimono was made only a single cloth width wide (hitotsumi). Tucks were also used to take in the garment; an outwards-facing pleat at each shoulder (kata-nuiage) and a kolpos-like overfold at the hip (koshi-nuiage), so that the child appeared to be wearing a sleeveless vest of the same fabric over their garment. These sewn tucks were let out as the child grew, and are mostly only seen today on the kimono of apprentice geisha in Kyoto, as apprentices previously began their training at a young age, requiring tucks to be let out as they grew. In the present day, apprentices begin their training in their late teenage years, and the tucks are retained merely as an anachronism.

Though adult women also retained a 'tuck' at the hip, this was a leftover from the trailing length of most women's kimono, which had previously been either held up by hand when walking or tied up loosely with a shigoki obi; though kimonos were not worn as trailing towards the end of the 19th century, the excess length of most women's kimono remained, with the hip fold formalised and neatened into the ohashori of the modern day.

Kimonos have a set method of construction, which allows the entire garment to be taken apart, cleaned and resewn easily. As the seam allowance on nearly every panel features two selvedges that will not fray, the woven edges of the fabric bolt are retained when the kimono is sewn, leading to large and often uneven seam allowances; unlike Western clothing, the seam allowances are not trimmed down, allowing for a kimono to be resewn to different measurements without the fabric fraying at the seams. This was also used to prolong the life of the garment by reversing the sleeves (hiding the worn cuff hem in the shoulder seam) or the back panels (swapping the high-stress center seam and the low-stress sides), like the European custom of side-to-middling or end-to-middling bedsheets.

Historically, kimonos were taken apart entirely to be washed – a process known as arai-hari. Once cleaned, the fabric would be resewn by hand; this process, though necessary in previous centuries, is uncommon in modern-day Japan, as it is relatively expensive.

Despite the expense of hand-sewing, however, some modern kimonos, including silk kimono and all formal styles, are still hand-sewn entirely; even machine-sewn kimonos require some degree of hand-sewing, particularly in finishing the collar, the hem, and the lining, if present. Hand-sewn kimonos are usually sewn with a single running stitch roughly 3 millimetres (0.12 in) to 4 millimetres (0.16 in) long, with stitches growing shorter around the collar area for strength. Kimono seams, instead of being pressed entirely flat, are pressed to have a 'lip' of roughly 2 millimetres (0.079 in) (known as the kise) pressed over each seam. This disguises the stitches, as hand-sewn kimonos are not tightly sewn, rendering the stitches visible if pressed entirely flat.

=== Terms ===
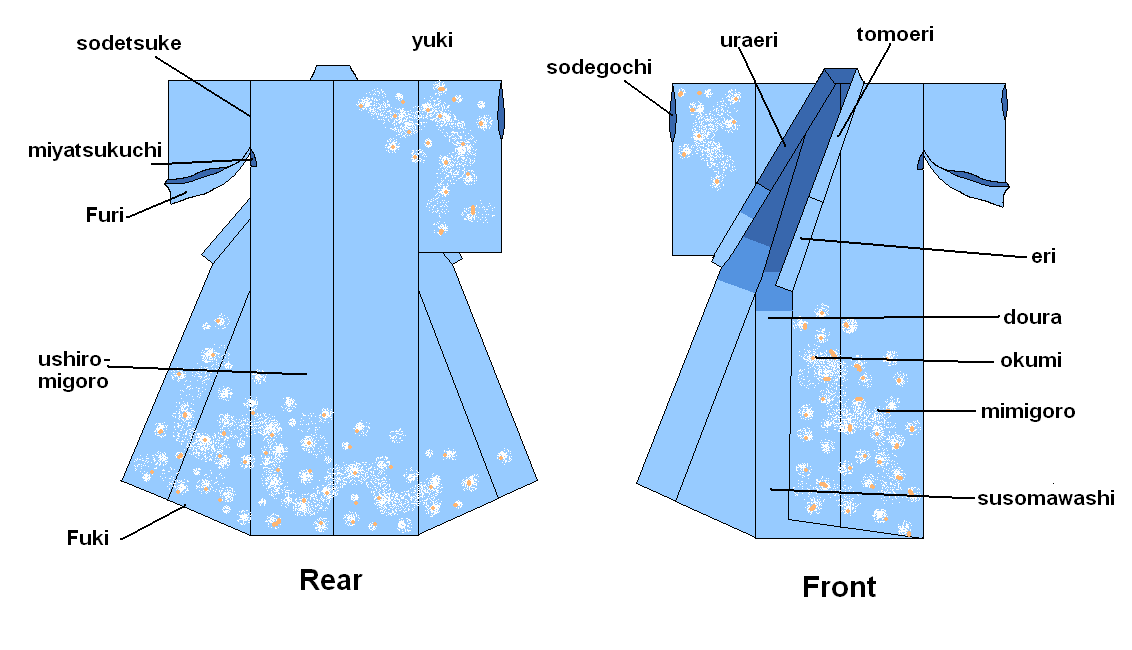
Diagram of the kimono parts

A number of terms are used to refer to the different parts of a kimono. Those that are lined are known as awase kimono, whereas unlined styles are known as hitoe kimono; partially lined kimonos – with lining only at the sleeve cuff, the back of the sleeve, the lower chest portion of the dōura and the entirety of the hakkake – are known as dō-bitoe (lit. 'chest-single-layer') kimono. Some fully lined kimono do not have a separate lower and upper lining, and are instead lined with solid panels on the okumi, the maemigoro and the ushiromigoro.

These terms name parts of a kimono:

Dōura (胴裏)
The upper lining of a kimono.
Hakkake (八掛)
The lower lining of a kimono.
Eri (衿)
The collar.
Fuki (袘)
The hem guard.
Furi (振り, lit. 'dangling')
The part of the sleeve left hanging below the armhole.
Maemigoro (前身頃, lit. 'front body')
The front panels on a kimono, excluding the okumi. The panels are divided into the "right maemigoro" and "left maemigoro".
Miyatsukuchi (身八つ口)
The opening under the sleeve on a woman's kimono.
Okumi (衽)
The overlapping front panel.
Sode (袖)
The entire sleeve.
Sodeguchi (袖口)
The wrist opening of the sleeve.
Sodetsuke (袖付)
The kimono armhole.
Susomawashi (裾回し)
The lower lining.
Tamoto (袂)
The sleeve pouch of a kimono.
Tomoeri (共衿, lit. 'over-collar')
The collar cover sewn on top of the uraeri.
Uraeri (裏襟, lit. 'neckband lining')
The inner collar.
Ushiromigoro (後身頃, lit. 'back body')
The back panels. The back panels consist of the "right ushiromigoro" and "left ushiromigoro".

=== Evolution of kimono construction ===
Comparison between a kosode (left) and a modern-day kimono (right)

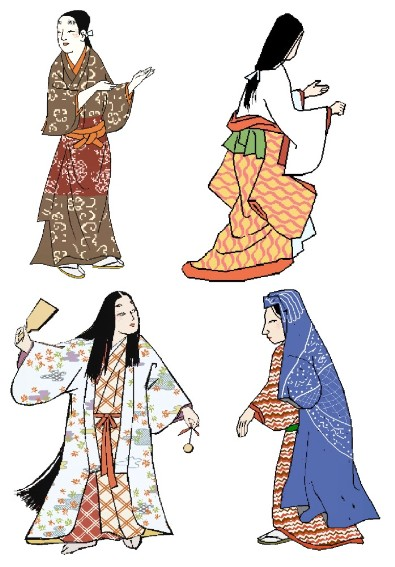
Ways of wearing kosode. Top left: as a belted and wrapped robe; top right: belted and off the shoulders in the koshimaki style; bottom left: as an unbelted outer robe kosode in the uchikake style; bottom right: over the head in the katsugi style.

Though the basic shape of the kimono has not changed in centuries, proportions have, historically, varied in different eras of Japanese history. Beginning in the later Heian period, the hitoe – an unlined robe worn as underwear – became the predominant outerwear garment for both men and women, known as the kosode (lit. 'small sleeve'). Court-appropriate dress continued to resemble the previous eras.

By the beginning of the Kamakura period, the kosode was an ankle-length garment for both men and women, and had small, rounded sleeves that were sewn to the body of the garment. The obi was a relatively thin belt tied somewhat low on the waist, usually in a plain bow, and was known as a hoso-obi. During this time period, the fashion of wearing a kosode draped around the shoulders, over the head, or as the outermost garment stripped off the shoulders and held in place by the obi, led to the rise of the uchikake – a heavily decorated over-kimono, stemming from the verb uchikake-ru (lit. 'to drape upon'), worn unbelted over the top of the kosode – becoming popular as formal dress for the upper classes.

In the following centuries, the kosode mostly retained its small, narrow and round-sleeved nature, with the length of women's sleeves gradually increasing over time and eventually becoming mostly detached from the body of the garment below the shoulders. The collar on both men's and women's kosode retained its relatively long and wide proportions, and the okumi front panel kept its long, shallow angle towards the hem. During the Edo period, the kosode had developed roughly modern kimono proportions, though variety existed until roughly the mid- to later years of the era. Men's sleeves continued to be sewn shut to the body of the kimono down most of their length, with no more than a few inches unattached at the bottom, unlike the women's style of very deep sleeves mostly detached from the body of the kimono. Men's sleeves were also less deep than women's kimono sleeves so that they did not get tied under the narrow obi around the hips, whereas on a woman's kimono, the long, unattached bottom of the sleeve could hang over the wider obi without getting in the way. Sleeves for both men and women grew in proportion to be of roughly equal width to the body panels, and the collar for both men's and women's kimono became shorter and narrower.

In the present day, both men's and women's kimono retain some historical features – for instance, women's kimono trailed along the floor throughout certain eras, and when the wearer went outside, the excess length would be tucked and tied underneath the obi in a hip fold known as the ohashori. The ohashori is now used for fine length adjustments, and takes up 7–10 inches (18–25 cm) of excess length. A hand-sewn tuck across the back under the obi is used for coarse adjustments, and made deliberately weak so that the stitches will tear before the cloth does under tension. Men's kimono, on the other hand, are cut to the length of the wearer's body and tied with a narrow belt at the hips, with no extra fabric in the kimono's length for an overfold at the hip.

Formal women's kimono retain the wider collar of previous eras (made from a full tanmono-width instead of a half width), though it is always folded in half lengthwise before wearing – a style known as hiro-eri (lit. 'wide collar', as opposed to bachi-eri, a normal width collar).

Women's kimonos are still worn trailing in some situations, such as onstage, in historical dramas, and by geisha and maiko. In these instances, the kimono worn is constructed differently to a regular women's kimono: the collar is set back further into the neck, the sleeves are sewn to the body unevenly (further down the front than the back), and the body is elongated. This style of kimono is referred to as a susohiki or hikizuri. Though the length of the kimono, collar style and sleeve construction differs for this type of kimono, in all other types of women's kimono, the construction is generally the same; the collar is set back only slightly into the nape of the neck, the sleeves are attached evenly only at the shoulder (not all the way down the sleeve length) and the kimono's length from shoulder to hem is ideally the entire height of the woman wearing it, to allow for the creation of the ohashori.

=== Sleeve length ===
The sleeve length (dropping down from the arm towards the floor when held outstretched) varies in kimono.

Sleeve lengths
Type	Sleeve length	Use
Men's sleeves		Men's sleeves are not visual markers of youth. They are attached to the body of the kimono all the way down, or almost all of the way down; though a small portion perhaps a few centimetres in length may be left unattached to the body at the very bottom, this portion is sewn closed. The construction of men's kimono sleeves reflects the fact that they do not have to accommodate the wider obi worn by women.
Tomesode, ordinary women's sleeves	49 cm (19 in), or hip-length	Usual women's length; this was longer pre-WWII, but was shortened due to rationing. This is the length almost invariably used for yukata, and used by definition for every type of tomesode kimono.
Furisode	Furisode (振袖, lit. 'swinging sleeve') kimonos are worn by young, typically unmarried, women. In the present day, the term furisode refers by definition to highly-formal long-sleeved kimono worn by girls and young women; however, informal kimono such as yukata with furisode-length sleeves are sometimes seen. In the past, mostly all young women wore long-sleeved kimono as a marker of youth generally regardless of the formality of their kimono, and upon marriage, women would cut or hem their sleeves shorter, or unpick the sleeves and swap them for an identical but shorter pair. Furisode were historically worn by all children, with no gender distinction in pattern or cut, but it is now only young girls who are dressed in furisode.	
Ko-furisode (also called nisyakusode) ("short")	76–86 cm (30–34 in)	Divided into kuro-furisode and iro-furisode, these are parallel versions of the formal, shorter-sleeved kurotomesode and irotomesode, but with longer sleeves. A ko-furisode with a komon-style pattern is deemed casual wear. Ko-furisode are also worn with hakama. In the modern era, ko-furisode are rare, but are sometimes worn for graduations. Most ko-furisode are vintage kimono, as in the modern day furisode are not worn often enough to warrant buying a more casual form of the dress.
Tyu-furisode or chu-furisode ("mid-size")	86–115 cm (34–45 in), or shoulder to calf; usually about 100 cm (39 in)	Tyu-furisode are suitable for most formal occasions; the sleeve length of tyu-furisode has been growing longer, due to growing people and the near-elimination of ō-furisode, and may be considered ō-furisode. Tyu-furisode are worn to seijin shiki (Coming of Age Day) or weddings, either by the bride herself or an unmarried younger female relative.
Ō-furisode or hon-furisode	114–115 cm (45–45 in), as high as 125 cm (49 in), or shoulder to ankle	Generally only worn by brides, dancers, and singers. The hem of the ō-furisode is padded so it can trail.

== Cost ==
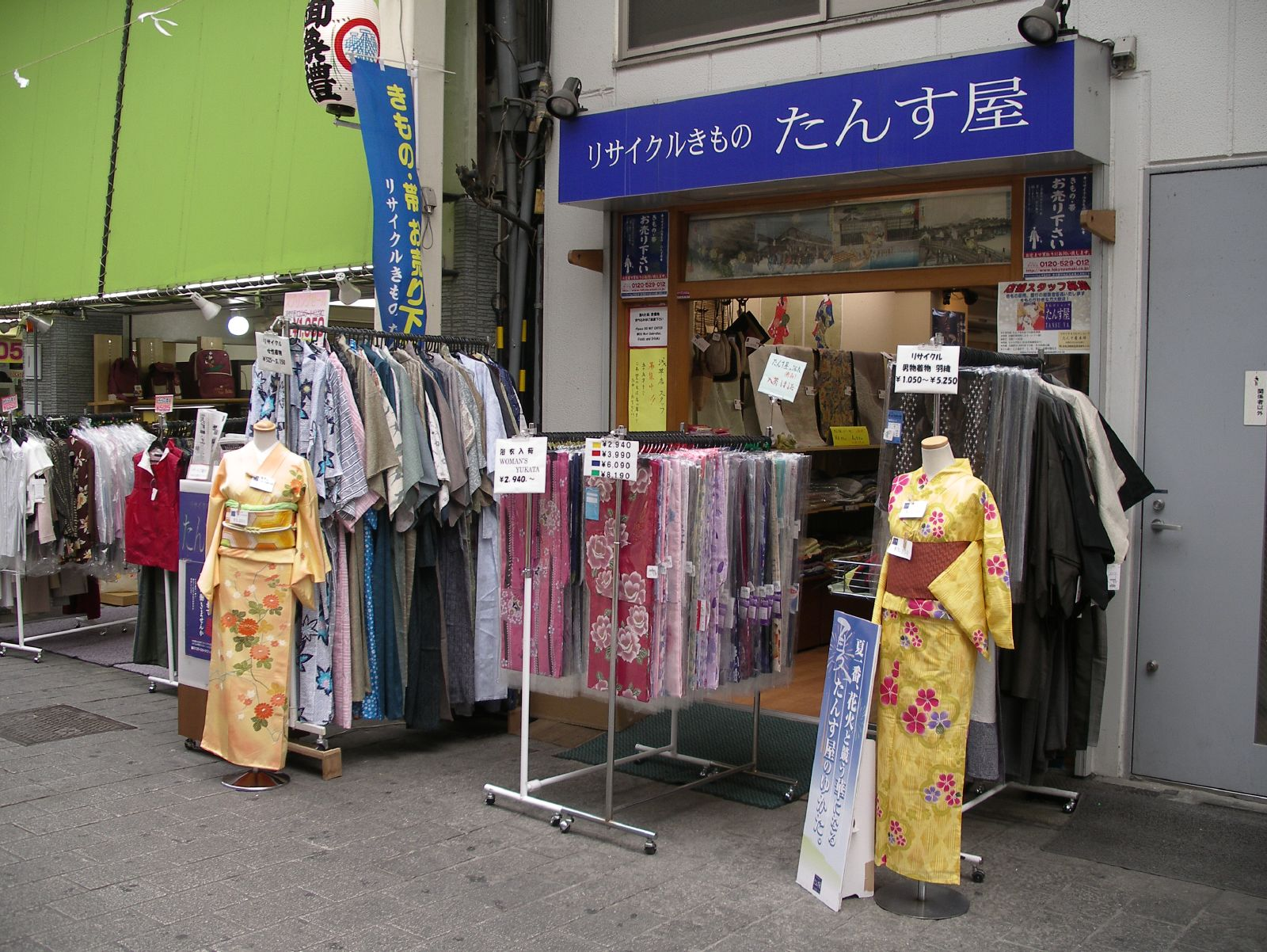
A modern second-hand kimono shop

Both men's and women's brand-new kimono can range in expense (in 2023) from around ¥1000 (~US$7) to ¥150,000 (~US$1050).

The high expense of some hand-crafted brand-new kimonos reflects the traditional industry, where the most skilled artisans practice specific, expensive and time-consuming techniques, known to and mastered only by a few. These techniques, such as hand-plied bashofu fabrics and hand-tied kanoko shibori dotwork dyeing, may take over a year to finish. Kimono artisans may be made Living National Treasures in recognition of their work, with the pieces they produce being considered culturally important.

Even kimonos that have not been hand-crafted will constitute a relatively high expense when bought new, as even for one outfit, a number of accessories of the right formality and appearance must be bought. Not all brand-new kimono originate from artisans, and mass-production of kimono – mainly of casual or semi-formal kimono – does exist, with mass-produced pieces being mostly cheaper than those purchased through a gofukuya (kimono shop).

Though artisan-made kimonos are some of the most accomplished works of textile art on the market, many pieces are not bought solely for appreciation of the craft. Unwritten social obligations to wear kimono to certain events – weddings, funerals – often leads consumers to purchase artisan pieces for reasons other than personal choice, fashion sense or love of kimono:

[Third-generation yūzen dyer Jotaro Saito] believes we are in a strange age where people who know nothing about kimonos are the ones who spend a lot of money on a genuine handcrafted kimono for a wedding that is worn once by someone who suffers wearing it, and then is never used again.

The high cost of most brand-new kimonos reflects in part the pricing techniques within the industry. Most brand-new kimonos are purchased through gofukuya, where kimonos are sold as fabric rolls only, the price of which is often left to the shop's discretion. The shop will charge a fee separate to the cost of the fabric for it to be sewn to the customer's measurements, and fees for washing the fabric or weatherproofing it may be added as another separate cost. If the customer is unfamiliar with wearing kimono, they may hire a service to help dress them; the end cost of a new kimono, therefore, remains uncertain until the kimono itself has been finished and worn.

Gofukuya are also regarded as notorious for high pressure sales practices seen as unscrupulous such as kakoikomi (囲い込み "enclosure"):

Many [Japanese kimono consumers] feared a tactic known as kakoikomi: being surrounded by staff and essentially pressured into purchasing an expensive kimono [...] Shops are also renowned for lying about the origins of their products and who made them [...] [My kimono dressing (kitsuke) teacher] gave me careful instructions before we entered the [gofukuya]: 'do not touch anything. And even if you don't buy a kimono today, you have to buy something, no matter how small it is.'

In contrast, kimonos bought by hobbyists are likely to be less expensive, purchased from second-hand stores with no such sales practices or obligation to buy. Hobbyists may also buy cheaper synthetic kimono (marketed as 'washable') brand-new. Some enthusiasts also make their own kimono; this may be due to difficulty finding kimono of the right size, or simply for personal choice and fashion.

Second-hand items are seen as highly affordable; costs can be as little as ¥100 (about US$0.90) at thrift stores within Japan, and certain historic kimono production areas around the country – such as the Nishijin district of Kyoto – are well known for their second-hand kimono markets. Kimono themselves do not go out of fashion, making even vintage or antique pieces viable for wear, depending on condition.

However, even second-hand women's obi are likely to remain somewhat pricey; a used, well-kept and high-quality second-hand obi can cost upwards of US$300, as they are often intricately woven, or decorated with embroidery, goldwork and may be hand-painted. Men's obi, in contrast, retail much cheaper, as they are narrower, shorter, and have either very little or no decoration, though high-end men's obi can still retail at a high cost equal to that of a high-end women's obi.

== Types ==
Several different types of kimono exist. These varieties are primarily based on formality and gender, with more women's varieties of kimono existing than men's.

The modern kimono canon was roughly formalised after WWII, following fabric shortages, a generation unfamiliar with wearing kimono in everyday life, and the postwar revival of kimono sales by gofukuya, traditional kimono shops. In previous centuries, types of kimono were not as distinct, with factors such as age and social class playing a much larger role in determining kimono types than they do presently. Beginning in the Meiji period, and following the Meiji Restoration and the abolition of class distinctions, kimono varieties began to change as Japanese society did, with new varieties being invented for new social situations.

=== Formality ===
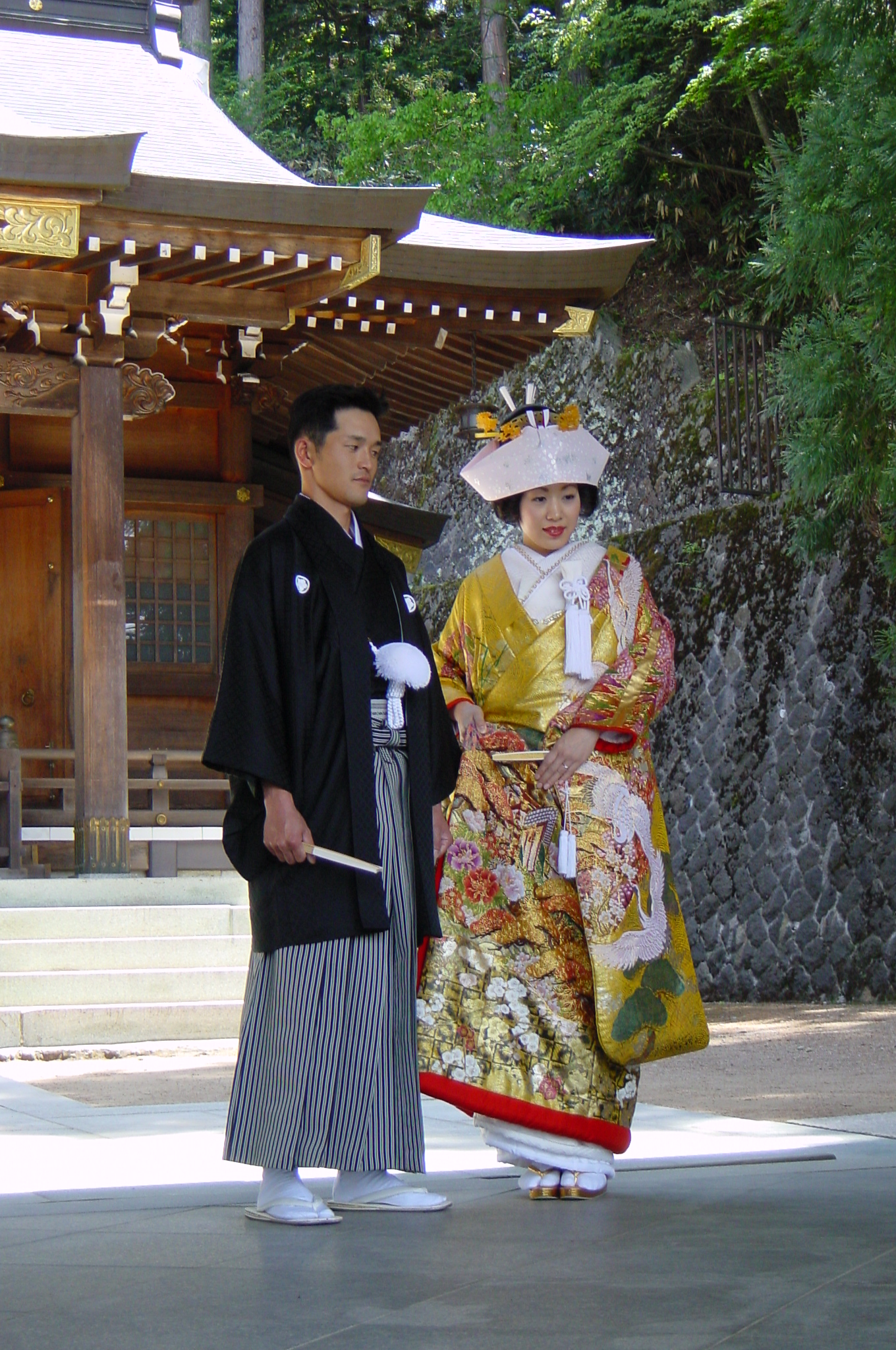
Couple being married in formal traditional dress

Kimonos range in variation from extremely formal to very casual. For women, the formality is determined mostly by pattern placement, decoration style, fabric choice and colour. For men, whose kimonos are generally monochromatic, formality is determined typically by fabric choice and colour. For both men and women, the accessories and obi worn with the kimono also determine formality.

The formality levels of different types of kimono are a relatively modern invention, having been developed between late Meiji- to post-war Japan, following the abolition of Edo period sumptuary clothing laws in 1868. These laws changed constantly, as did the strictness with which they were enforced, and were designed to keep the nouveau riche merchant classes from dressing above their station, and appearing better-dressed than monetarily-poor but status-rich samurai class.

==== Colours and patterns ====
Under feudal sumptuary laws, colours were restricted by class; for instance, indigo-dyed clothing was allowed for all classes, and was commonly seen in hand-dyed cotton, linen or hemp kasuri fabrics, but other dyes, such as reds and purples, were forbidden to those below a certain class. Sometimes, for some classes, designs were restricted to below the belt, to the bottoms of the sleeves (for furisode) or to along the hem (suso-moyo); sometimes they were banned altogether, and were transferred to the collar of the underkimono, or the inside of the hem, where only the faintest glimpse would be intermittently visible. This type of subtle ostentation became an aesthetic known as iki, and outlasted the sumptuary laws. Modern-day rules of formality, however, still echo clothing distinctions typically employed by the uppermost samurai classes.

Aspects of men's kimono still follow this extreme of iki. Bright, elaborate decoration is used on the lining of the haori (jacket), and on men's juban (underkimono), which is not worn as an outer layer outside the home, and so only shows at the neck and inside the sleeves. Women's juban were once bright and boldly-patterned (and were often kimono too damaged to use as an outer layer, repurposed), but are now typically muted pastel shades. The outside of men's garments tended towards subtle patterns and colours even after the sumptuary laws lifted, with blues and blacks predominating, but designers later came to use browns, greens, purples, and other colours in increasingly bold patterns.

Older people generally wear more subtle patterns, and younger people brighter, bolder ones.

==== Fabric type ====
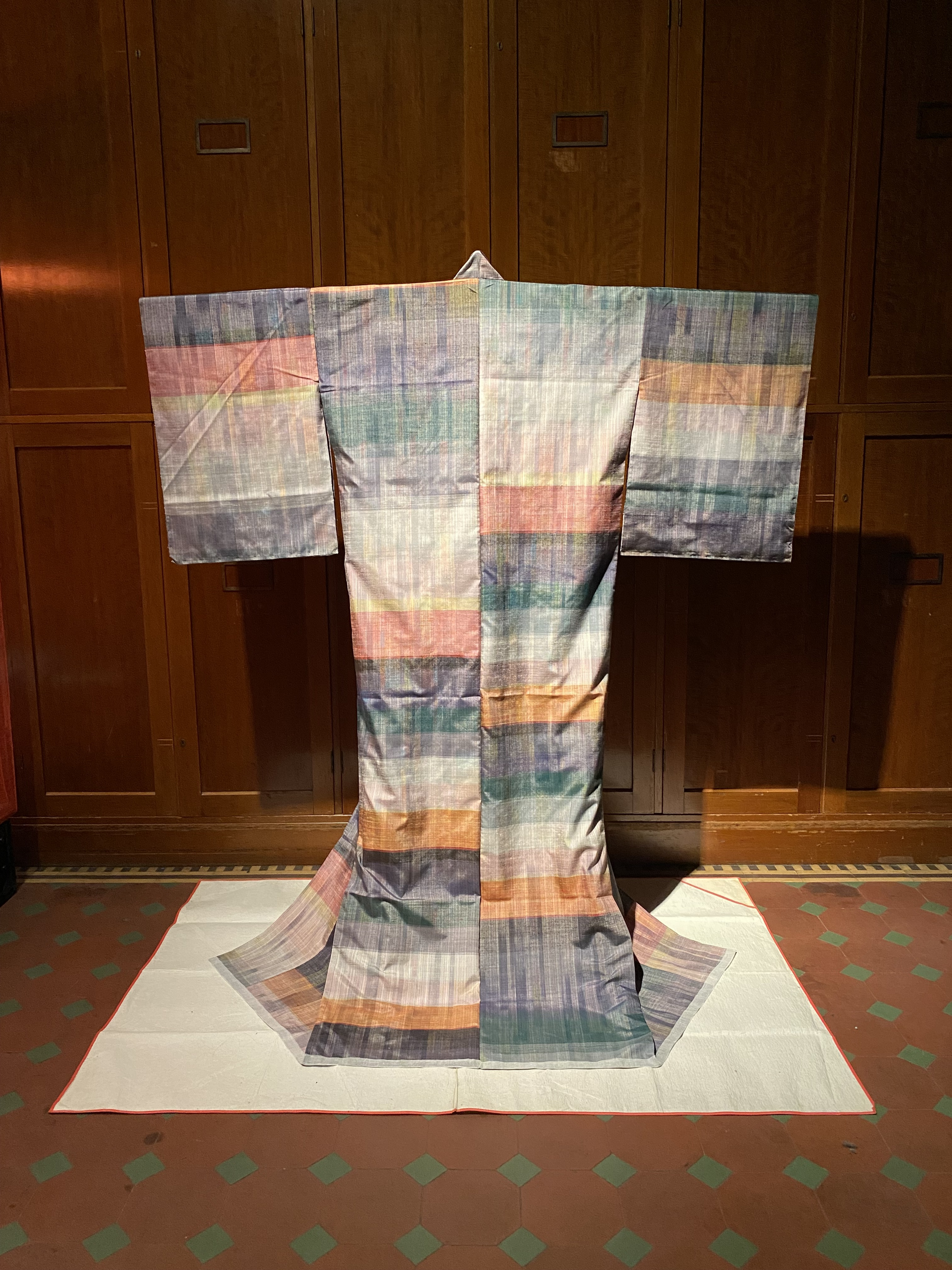
Oitama Tsumugi kimono, Craft x Tech Tohoku Project, Victoria and Albert museum (2024)

Kimono vary widely in fabric type, and are not all made of silk. Certain types of fabric, such as wool, cotton, linen and hemp, are always considered informal, and so are not seen on more formal varieties of kimono. Certain varieties of silk, such as tsumugi, are considered informal, having once been woven only by silk farmers out of unusable cocoons for their own use; other, more modern varieties, such as meisen, were designed to be used as casual, cheap daywear, and are machine-spun and -woven using brightly patterned yarns. Some varieties of crêpe are on the lowest end of formal, with their rougher texture considered unsuitable for formal use; other varieties, such as smooth crêpe, are used for all varieties of formal kimono. The most formal kimonos are only ever made of smooth, fine silks, such as glossy silk fabrics like habutai.

Some fabrics are also worn only at certain times of year; ro, for instance, is a plain-weave fabric with leno weave stripes only worn in high summer (July and August), but is used for all types of kimono and for other garments, such as under-kimono and obi. Some fabrics – such as certain types of crêpe – are never seen in certain varieties of kimono, (Note: Rough crêpe fabrics are not used for iromuji, whereas smooth crêpe fabrics are.) and some fabrics such as shusu (heavy satin) silk are barely ever seen in modern kimono or obi altogether, having been more popular in previous eras than in the present-day.

Despite their informal nature, many types of traditional, informal kimono fabrics are highly prized for their craftsmanship. Varieties of tsumugi, kasuri, and fabrics woven from Musa basjoo are valued for their traditional production, and regularly command high prices.

==== Lined and unlined kimono ====
In the summer months (from June until October in the most stringent kimono guides, such as those for tea ceremony), kimonos are unlined (hitoe); for the rest of the year, they are lined (awase). This applies to all types of kimono, with a few caveats: the very informal yukata is always unlined, and thus only worn in summer; the most formal kimono, in contrast, are unlikely to be worn unlined in summer, as many people simply do not have more than one formal kimono to wear, and do not wear formal kimono often enough to warrant the purchase of a new, unlined kimono, just for summer wear. Obi also change fabric type in the summer months.

Within the two realms of lined and unlined, further distinctions exist for different months. Lined kimonos are either made from transparent or gauze fabrics (usu-mono) or opaque fabrics, with kimono transitioning towards gauze fabrics at the height of summer and away from them as autumn begins. In one kimono guide for tea ceremony, at the start of the unlined season in June, fabrics such as kawari-chirimen (a type of silk crêpe noted as a more "wrinkle-resistant" form of hitokoshi-chirimen) and komayori ro (a thicker type of ro with twisted silk threads) are recommended for wear. Following the beginning of the rainy season in some time in July, fabrics switch over to gauzier varieties, and highly prized hemp fabrics such as Echigo-jofu are worn. Continuing into August, hemp, ro and sha continue to be worn; in September, they are still worn, but fabrics such as hitokoshi chirimen, worn in June, become suitable again, and opaque fabrics become preferred over sheer, though sheer may still be worn if the weather is hot.

In the same kimono guide, the first lined kimonos are worn in October, and the transition away from plainer opaque fabrics to richer silks such as rinzu is immediate. The richness of fabrics increases going into November and December, with figured silks featuring woven patterns appropriate. Coming into January, crêpe fabrics with a rougher texture become appropriate, with fabrics such as tsumugi worn in February. Figured silks continue to be worn until June, when the unlined season begins again. In Japan, this process of changing clothes is referred to as koromogae.

==== Crests ====
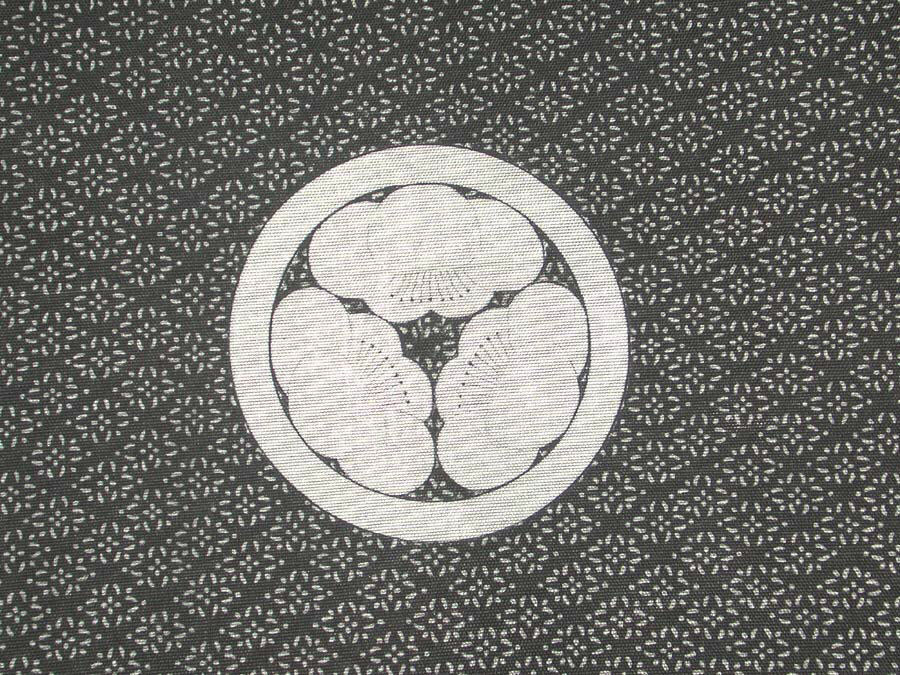
A hinata kamon dyed onto a kimono

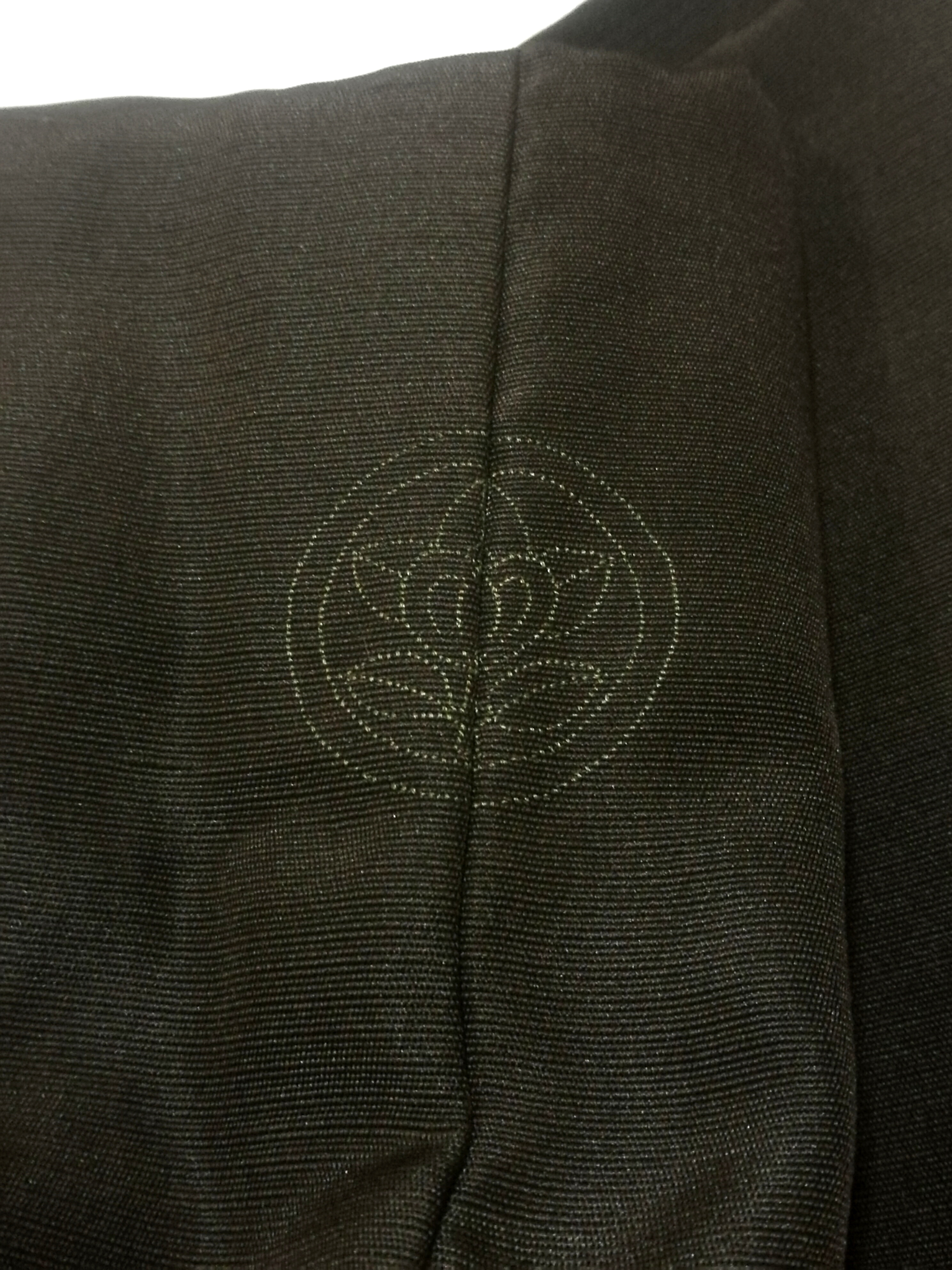
A dyed 'shadow' (kage) kamon on the centre-back seam of a haori

Formality is also determined by the number and type of mon or kamon (crests). Five crests (itsutsu mon) are the most formal, three crests (mitsu mon) are mid-formality, and one crest (hitotsu mon) is the least formal, used for occasions such as tea ceremony. Kimono (and other garments, like hakama) with mon are called montsuki ("mon-carrying"). The type of crest adds formality as well. A "full sun" (hinata) crest, where the design is outlined and filled in with white, is the most formal type. A "mid-shadow" (nakakage) crest is mid-formality, with only the outline of the crest visible in white. A "shadow" (kage) crest is the least formal, with the outline of the crest relatively faint. Shadow crests may be embroidered onto the kimono, and full-embroidery crests, called nui mon, are also seen.

==== Choice of accessories ====
Formality can also be determined by the type and colour of accessories. For women, this may be the weave of obijime and the style of obiage. For men, adding a haori (a traditional jacket) makes an outfit more formal, and adding both haori and hakama (traditional trousers) is more formal still. The material, colour, and pattern of these overgarments also varies in formality. Longer haori are also more formal.

==== Sleeve length and construction ====
Both men's and women's kimonos feature sleeves considered relatively short, with men's sleeves shorter than women's. Though lengths can vary by a few centimetres, these lengths are informally standardised.

Men's kimono sleeves are only ever one length, and women's sleeves are limited to a short length suitable for almost all types of kimono, or a longer length used for only one type of formal young women's kimono. In the modern day, the two lengths of women's sleeve worn on kimonos are furisode length, which almost reaches the floor, and a shorter length, used for every other variety of women's kimono.

Before WWII, the length of women's kimono sleeves varied, with sleeves gradually shortening as a woman got older. During WWII, due to shortage of fabric, the 'short' length of women's kimono sleeves became standardised, and post-WWII, the realm of long kimono sleeves was narrowly curtailed to the realm of furisode only – formal young women's and girl's kimono, where previously longer sleeves were seen on other varieties of dress, both formal and informal. Pre-WWII women's kimonos are recognisable for their longer sleeves, which, though not furisode length, are longer than most women's kimono sleeves today.

Young women are not limited to wearing only furisode, and outside of formal occasions that warrant it, can wear all other types of women's kimono which feature shorter sleeves.

=== General types ===
==== Juban (襦袢) ====
The juban, also called the nagajuban (長襦袢), is an under-kimono worn by both men and women. Juban resemble a kimono in construction, with a few key differences: the sleeves are typically open along the entire cuff side, with only a few stitches sewing both sides together placed where a normal kimono sleeve cuff would end; the sleeve has no curve sewn into the outer edge, instead being square; the juban is typically a little shorter than the length of a kimono when worn, and features no extra length to be bloused into an ohashori for women's kimono; the front either does not have any overlapping panels (okumi) or features only thin ones, with the collar set at a lower angle than that of a regular kimono. Juban are considered an essential piece of kimono underwear, and are worn with all types of kimono except for yukata.

Juban are typically made of lightweight materials, often silk. Women's juban and can either be patterned or entirely plain, and modern women's juban are frequently white in colour.

Men's juban are often dyed in dark colours, and can be made of the same material as the outer kimono, as some kimono fabric bolts (tanmono) are woven with enough length to accommodate this. Men's juban are frequently more decorative than women's, often featuring a dyed pictorial scene in the upper back, such as a scene from The Tale of Genji.

In the late 19th and early 20th century, women's juban transitioned from being mostly red with bold white motifs to being white or light pastel colours. The dye technique previously used to achieve this, beni itajime, fell out of fashion and knowledge and was rediscovered in 2010.

==== Hadajuban (肌襦袢) ====
Hadajuban are a type of kimono undergarment traditionally worn underneath the nagajuban. Hadajuban are even further removed from resembling a kimono in construction than the nagajuban; the hadajuban comes in two pieces (a wrap-front top and a skirt), features no collar, and either has tube sleeves or is sleeveless.

Unlike the nagajuban, the hadajuban is not considered an essential piece of kimono underwear, and a t-shirt and shorts are frequently substituted in its place.

==== Yukata (浴衣) ====
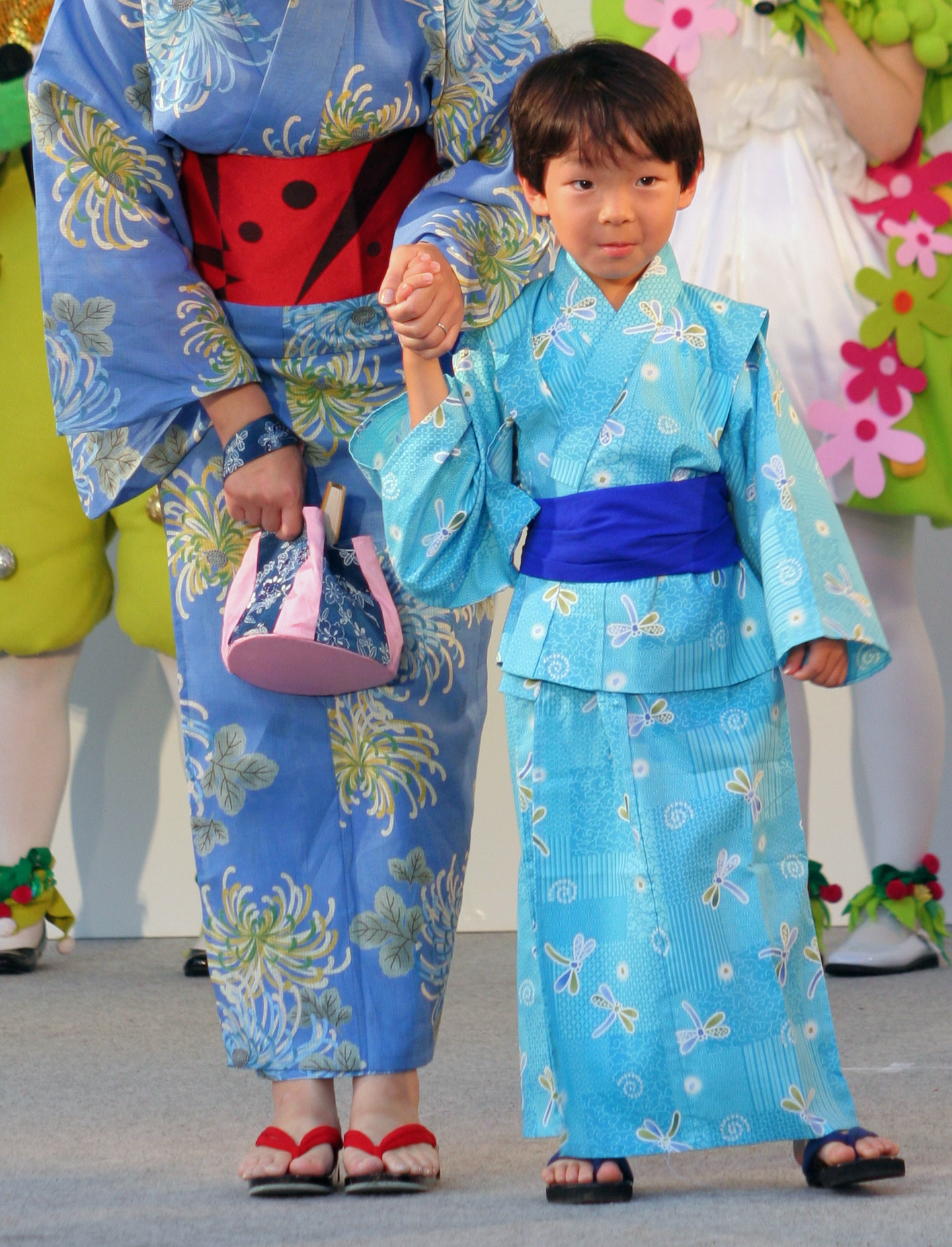
A woman and a young boy wearing yukata decorated with spider chrysanthemums and dragonflies respectively

Yukata (浴衣) are casual cotton summer kimonos worn by both men and women. Yukata were originally very simple indigo and white cotton kimono, little more than a bathrobe worn either within the house, or for a short walk locally; yukata were worn by guests at inns, with the design of the yukata displaying the inn a person was staying at. From roughly the mid-1980s onwards, they began to be produced in a wider variety of colours and designs, responding to demand for a more casual kimono that could be worn to a summer festival, and have since become more formal than their previous status as bathrobes, with high-end, less colourful yukata sometimes standing in place of komon.

In the present day, many yukata are brightly coloured, featuring large motifs from a variety of different seasons. For women, they are worn with either a hanhaba obi (half-width obi) or a heko obi (a soft, sash-like obi), and are often accessorised with colourful hair accessories. For men, yukata are worn with either an informal kaku obi or a heko obi. Children generally wear a heko obi with yukata.

Yukata are always unlined, and it is possible for women to wear a casual nagoya obi with a high-end, more subdued yukata, often with a juban underneath. A high-end men's yukata could be dressed up in the same way.

A yukata is traditionally worn as a single layer or over a hadajuban (an underkimono worn underneath the nagajuban, featuring a simplified construction). Yukata may be worn over the top of a t-shirt and shorts. This distinguishes yukata from a more-formal komon kimono, where a nagajuban (also described as a juban, an underkimono resembling) is worn underneath, showing a second layer of collar at the neckline. However, some modern yukata are worn with collared cotton juban featuring a collar of linen, cotton or ro, for occasions such as informal eating-out.

==== Tsumugi (紬) ====
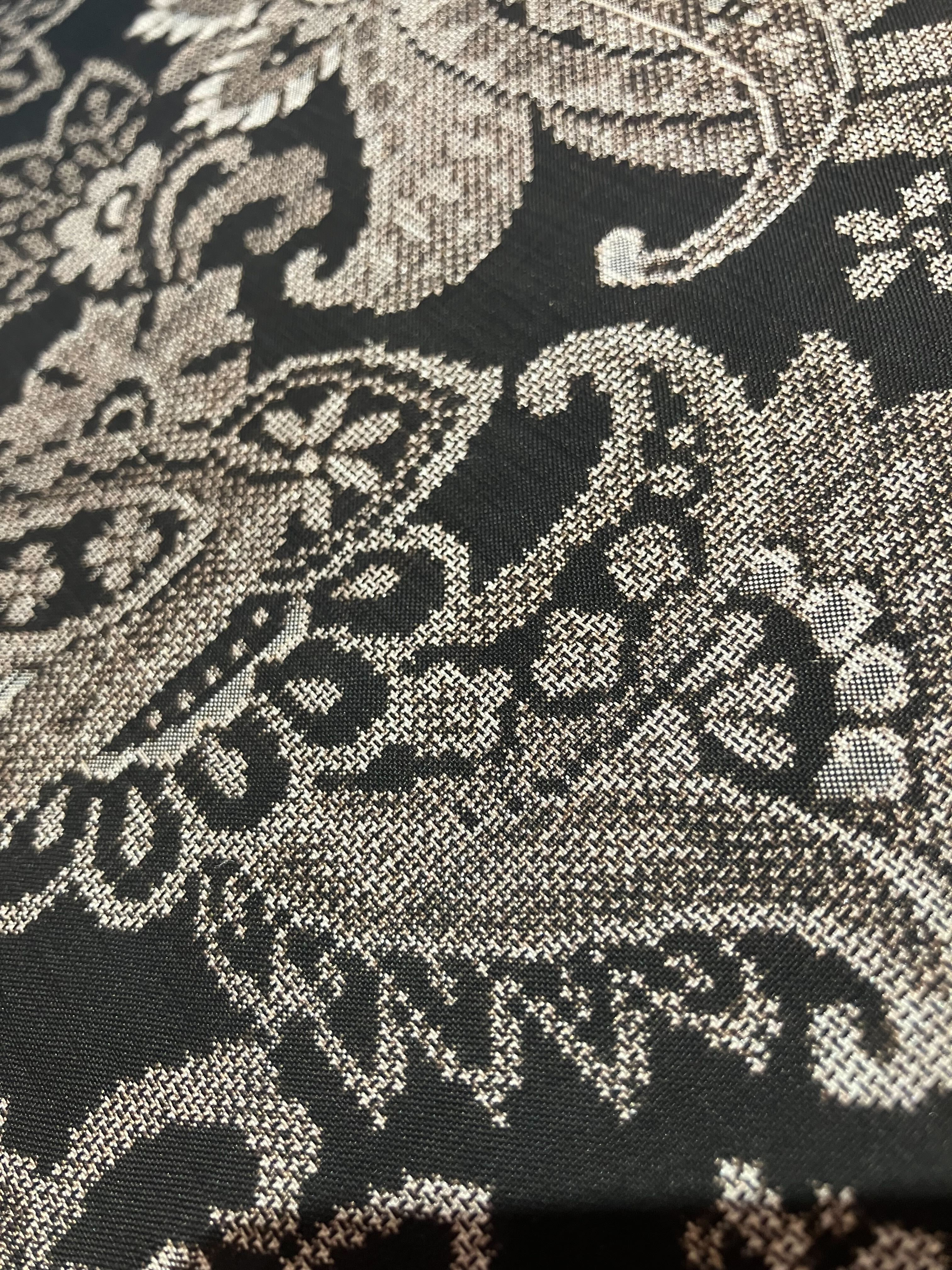
Detailed kasuri (絣) on an Ōshima-tsumugi Kimono

Tsumugi (紬) are casual silk kimono worn by both men and women. Tsumugi kimono traditionally referred to kimono woven in plain weave with silk noil, short-staple silk fibre, though now include various types of casual silk kimono whereby the pattern is produced by weave as opposed to surface dying. Tsumugi kimonos are often dyed with Kasuri patterns.

==== Komon (小紋) ====
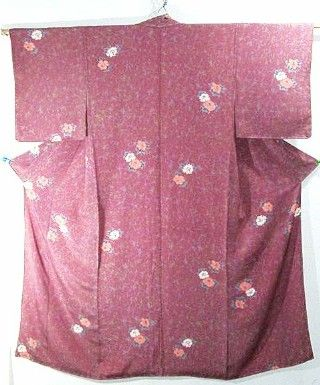
A komon with a small, repeating floral pattern

Komon (小紋, lit. 'small pattern', though the patterns may in fact be large) are informal women's kimono. They were the type most often worn as everyday womenswear in pre-war Japan. Though informal, komon with smaller, denser patterns are considered a shade more formal than komon with larger, bolder patterns.

Komon mostly have no kamon (crests), and the sleeves are fairly short. They are made with a repeating designs, though the repeat length may be quite long. Designs can be made with any method; woven patterns, prints, stencilled patterns in alternating orientations, freehand painting (yūzen) or tie-dye patterns (shibori). Traditionally the direction of the fabric was alternated in adjacent panels (necessary due to the lack of shoulder seam), so patterns were generally reversible. If the pattern is the same way up on each panel, the komon is more formal, approaching tsukesage-level formality.

Woven geometric patterns (such as stripes) have no season, but others show images representing the season in general. Woven non-geometric patterns (kasuri) are common. Small, dense patterns are often used; this is practical, as fine-scale patterns hides stains.

Komon are made with informal materials such as tsumugi (slubbed silk), cotton, linen, ramie, and hemp. In the modern day, synthetic blends and synthetics are often used; rayon (jinken) and polyester are common.

Now that kimonos are not typically worn as informal clothing, komon are not worn as often as formal kimono, though they have a wider range of suitable use. Edo komon are the most formal type of komon; they may have one to three crests, with a small, fine pattern that appears to be a solid colour from a distance, and so resembles the more formal iromuji.

==== Edo komon (江戸小紋) ====
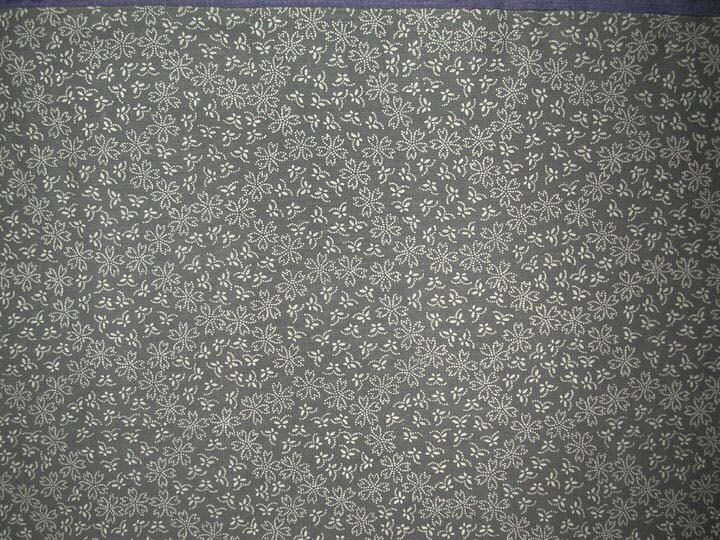
This edo komon pattern is stencil-dyed onto the fabric.

Edo komon (江戸小紋) are a type of komon worn by women characterised by an extremely small repeating pattern, usually done in white on a coloured background. The edo komon dyeing technique is sometimes said to originate in the late Heian period (circa mid-12th century), with a motif called kozakura, which shows tiny stylised cherry blossoms on a background of white dots. In the Edo period (1603–1867), the samurai classes used them for kamishimo formal wear, with specific patterns becoming associated with specific families. Towards the end of the Edo period, in the early 1800s, commoners began to wear them. Edo komon are of a similar formality to iromuji, and edo komon with one kamon can be worn as low-formality visiting wear; because of this, they are always made of silk, unlike regular komon.

==== Iromuji (色無地) ====
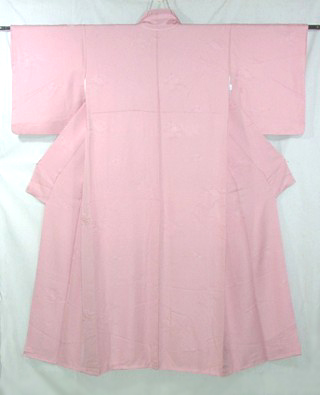
Iromuji

Iromuji (色無地, lit. 'solid colour') are monochromatic, undecorated women's kimonos mainly worn to tea ceremonies, as the monochrome appearance is considered to be unobtrusive to the ceremony itself. Despite being monochromatic, iromuji may feature a woven design; iromuji suitable for autumn are often made of rinzu damask silk. Some edo komon with incredibly fine patterns are considered suitable for tea ceremony, as from a distance they are visually similar to iromuji. Iromuji may occasionally have one kamon, though likely no more than this, and are always made of silk. Shibori accessories such as obiage are never worn with iromuji if the purpose of wear is a tea ceremony; instead, flat and untextured silks are chosen for accessories.

==== Tsukesage (付け下げ) ====
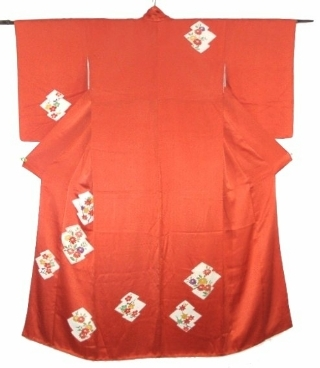
Tsukesage

Tsukesage (付け下げ) are low-ranking women's formalwear, and are a step below hōmongi, though the two sometimes appear similar or indistinguishable. The motifs on a tsukesage are placed similarly to those of a hōmongi – across the back-right shoulder and back-right sleeve, the front-left shoulder and the front-left sleeve, and across the hem, higher at the left than the right – but, unlike hōmongi, do not typically cross over the seams of each kimono panel, though some confusingly do. In older examples, the motifs may instead be placed symmetrically along the hem, with the skirt patterns mirrored down the centre-back seam.

Similarities between tsukesage and hōmongi often lead to confusion, with some tsukesage indistinguishable from hōmongi; often, tsukesage are only distinguishable from hōmongi by the size of the motifs used, with smaller, less fluid motifs generally considered to be tsukesage, and larger, more fluid motifs considered to be hōmongi.

Tsukesage can have between one and three kamon, and can be worn to parties, but not ceremonies or highly formal events.

==== Hōmongi (訪問着) ====
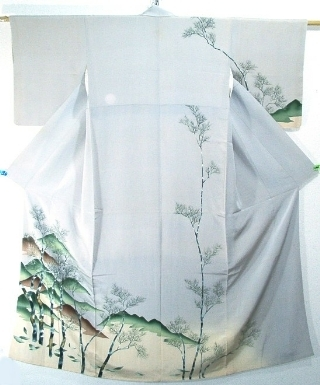
Hōmongi

Hōmongi (訪問着, lit. 'visiting wear') are women's formal kimonos with the same pattern placement as a tsukesage, but with patterns generally matching across the seams. They are always made of silk, and are considered more formal than the tsukesage.

Hōmongi are first roughly sewn up, and the design is sketched onto the fabric, before the garment is taken apart to be dyed again. The hōmongi's close relative, the tsukesage, has its patterns dyed on the bolt before sewing up. This method of production can usually distinguish the two, as the motifs on a hōmongi are likely to cross fluidly over seams in a way a tsukesage generally will not. However, the two can prove near-indistinguishable at times.

Hōmongi may be worn by both married and unmarried women; often friends of the bride will wear hōmongi to weddings (except relatives) and receptions. They may be worn to formal parties.

==== Irotomesode (色留袖) ====
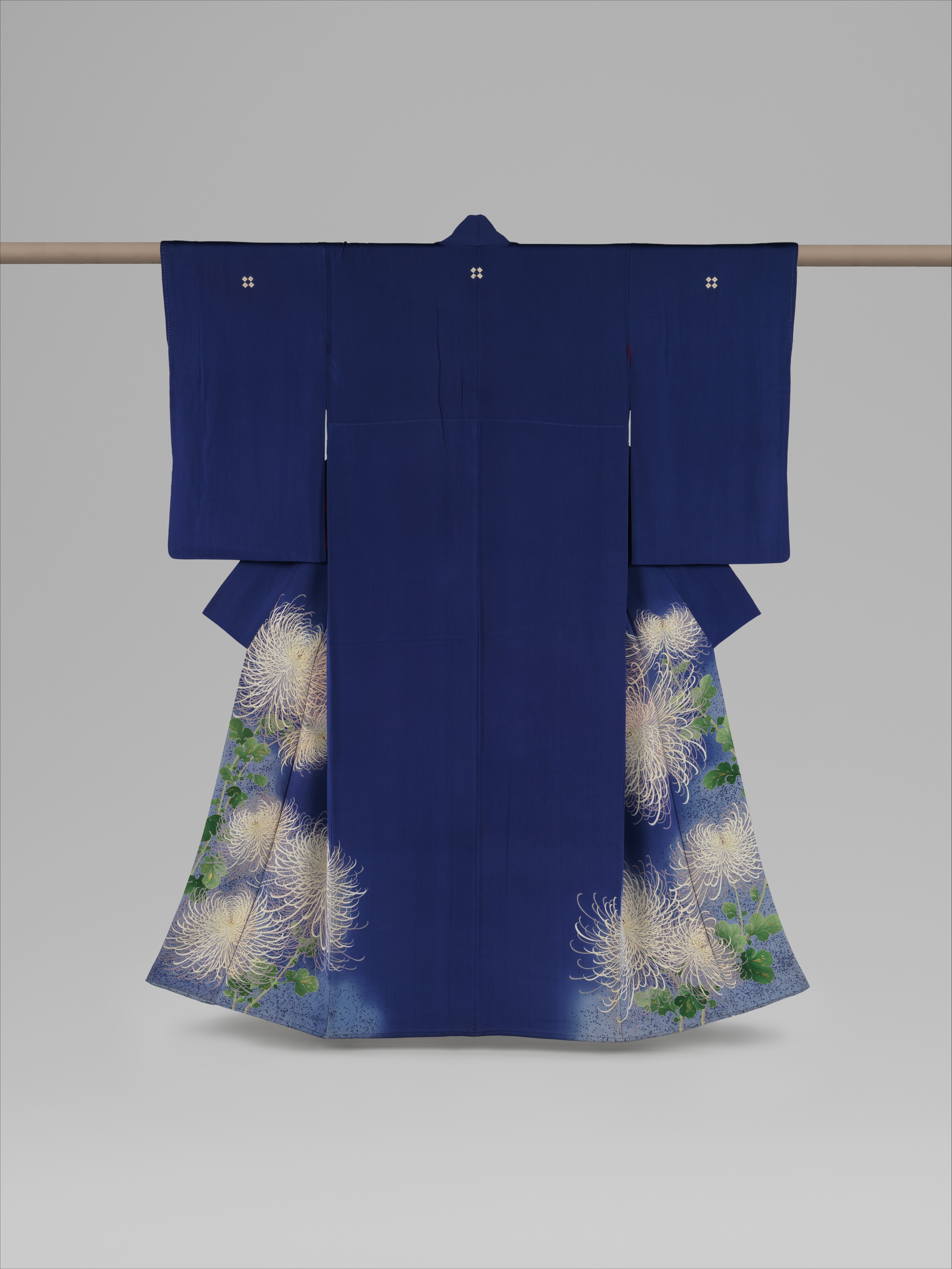
An irotomesode dating to the 1920s displaying a mirrored skirt pattern (the same garment as in the wedding image at the top of the page)

Irotomesode (色留袖, lit. 'colour short-sleeve') are formal women's kimono that feature a design along the hem on a coloured background. They are slightly less formal than kurotomesode, which have roughly the same pattern placement on a black background. Irotomesode, though worn to formal events, may be chosen when a kurotomesode would make the wearer appear to be overdressed for the situation. The pattern placement for irotomesode is roughly identical to kurotomesode, though patterns seen along the fuki and okumi may drift slightly into the back hem itself. Irotomesode with five kamon are of the same formality as any kurotomesode. Irotomesode may be made of figured silk such as rinzū.

===== Iro-montsuki (色紋付) =====
Iro-montsuki (lit. 'colour mon-decorated') are formal men's kimonos. Iro-montsuki feature formal crests along the shoulders on a colour background, which, apart from the cut of the sleeve, appears the same as an irotomesode from the waist up, and thus cannot be distinguished in pattern when worn under the hakama. Because formalwear for men requires hakama, men do not wear formal kimono that have elaborate patterns on the hem, as these would be hidden.

==== Kurotomesode (黒留袖) ====
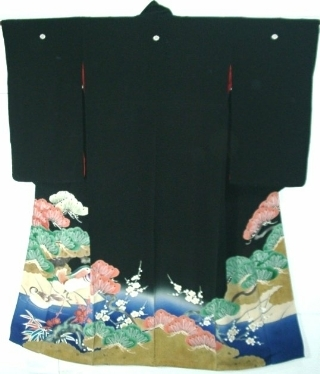
A pre-WWII kurotomesode with three crests and longer sleeves

Kurotomesode (黒留袖, lit. 'black short-sleeve') are formal women's kimonos, featuring a black background and a design along the hem. They are the most formal women's kimono, and are worn to formal events such as weddings and wedding parties. The design is only present along the hem; the further up the body this design reaches, the younger the wearer is considered to be, though for a very young woman an irotomesode may be chosen instead, kurotomesode being considered somewhat more mature. The design is either symmetrically placed on the fuki and okumi portions of the kimono, or asymmetrically placed along the entirety of the hem, with the design being larger and higher-placed at the left side than the right. Vintage kimono are more likely to have the former pattern placement than the latter, though this is not a hard rule.

Kurotomesode are always made of silk, and may have a hiyoku – a false lining layer – attached, occasionally with a slightly padded hem. A kurotomesode usually has between 3 and 5 crests; a kurotomesode of any number of crests outranks an irotomesode with less than five. Kurotomesode, though formalwear, are not allowed at the royal court, as black is the colour of mourning, despite the colour designs decorating the kimono itself; outside of the royal court, this distinction for kurotomesode does not exist. Kurotomesode are never made of flashy silks such as rinzū, but are instead likely to be a matte fabric with little texture.

Kurotomesode typically feature kazari jitsuke (飾り仕付け), small white decorative prickstitches along the collar.

===== Kuro-montsuki (黒紋付) =====
Kuro-montsuki ("black mon-decorated") are the most formal men's kimono, which, apart from the cut of the sleeve, look exactly the same from the waist up as a kurotomesode, and thus cannot be distinguished in pattern when worn under the hakama required for men's formal dress.

=== Occasion-specific types ===
==== Mofuku (喪服) ====
Mofuku (喪服) are a category of kimono and accessories suitable for mourning, worn by both men and women. Mofuku kimono, obi and accessories are characterised by their plain, solid black appearance. Mofuku kimonos are plain black silk with five kamon, worn with white undergarments and white tabi. Men wear a kimono of the same kind, with a subdued obi and a black-and-white or black-and-grey striped hakama, worn with black or white zōri.

A completely black mourning ensemble for women – a plain black obi, black obijime and black obiage – is usually reserved for those closest to the deceased. Those further away will wear kimono in dark and subdued colours, rather than a plain black kimono with a reduced number of crests. In time periods when kimonos were worn more often, those closest to the deceased would slowly begin dressing in coloured kimono over a period of weeks after the death, with the obijime being the last thing to be changed over to colour.

==== Uchikake (打ち掛け) ====
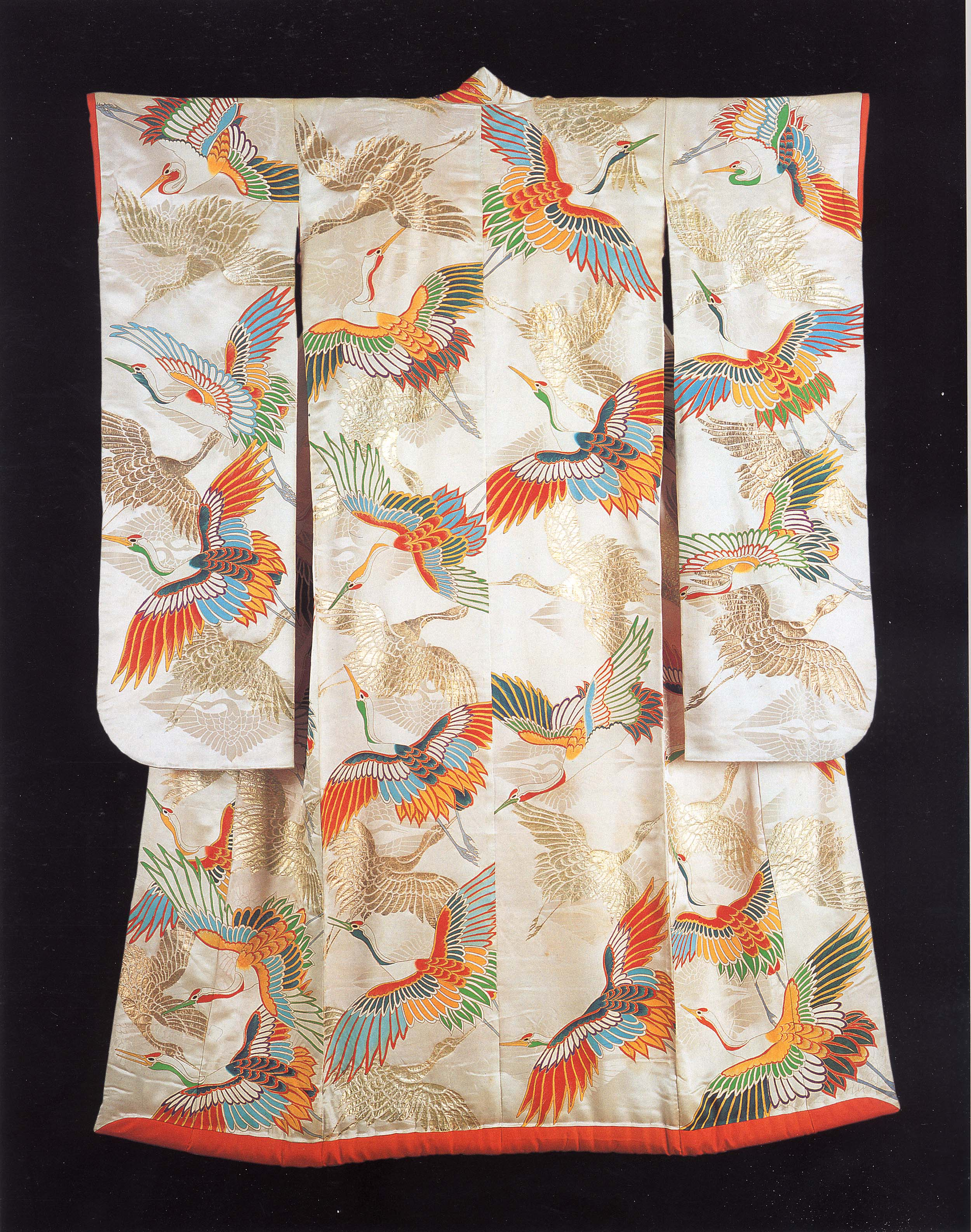
An uchikake (formal over-kimono) depicting cranes, from the Khalili Collection of Kimono

Uchikake (打ち掛け) are highly formal women's over-kimonos, worn only by brides or onstage. The name uchikake comes from the Japanese verb uchikake-ru, "to drape upon", originating in roughly the 16th century from a fashion amongst the ruling classes of the time to wear kimono (then called kosode, lit. 'small sleeve') unbelted over the shoulders of one's other garments; the uchikake progressed into being an over-kimono worn by samurai women before being adopted some time in the 20th century as bridal wear.

Uchikake are designed to be worn over the top of a complete kimono outfit with obi, and thus are not designed to be worn belted. Unlike their 16th century counterparts, modern uchikake generally could not double as a regular kimono, as they often feature heavy, highly-formal decoration and may be padded throughout, if not solely on the hem. They are designed to trail along the floor, and the heavily padded hem helps to achieve this.

Bridal uchikake are typically red or white, and often decorated heavily with auspicious motifs. Because they are not designed to be worn with an obi, the designs cover the entirety of the back.

==== Shiromuku (白無垢) ====
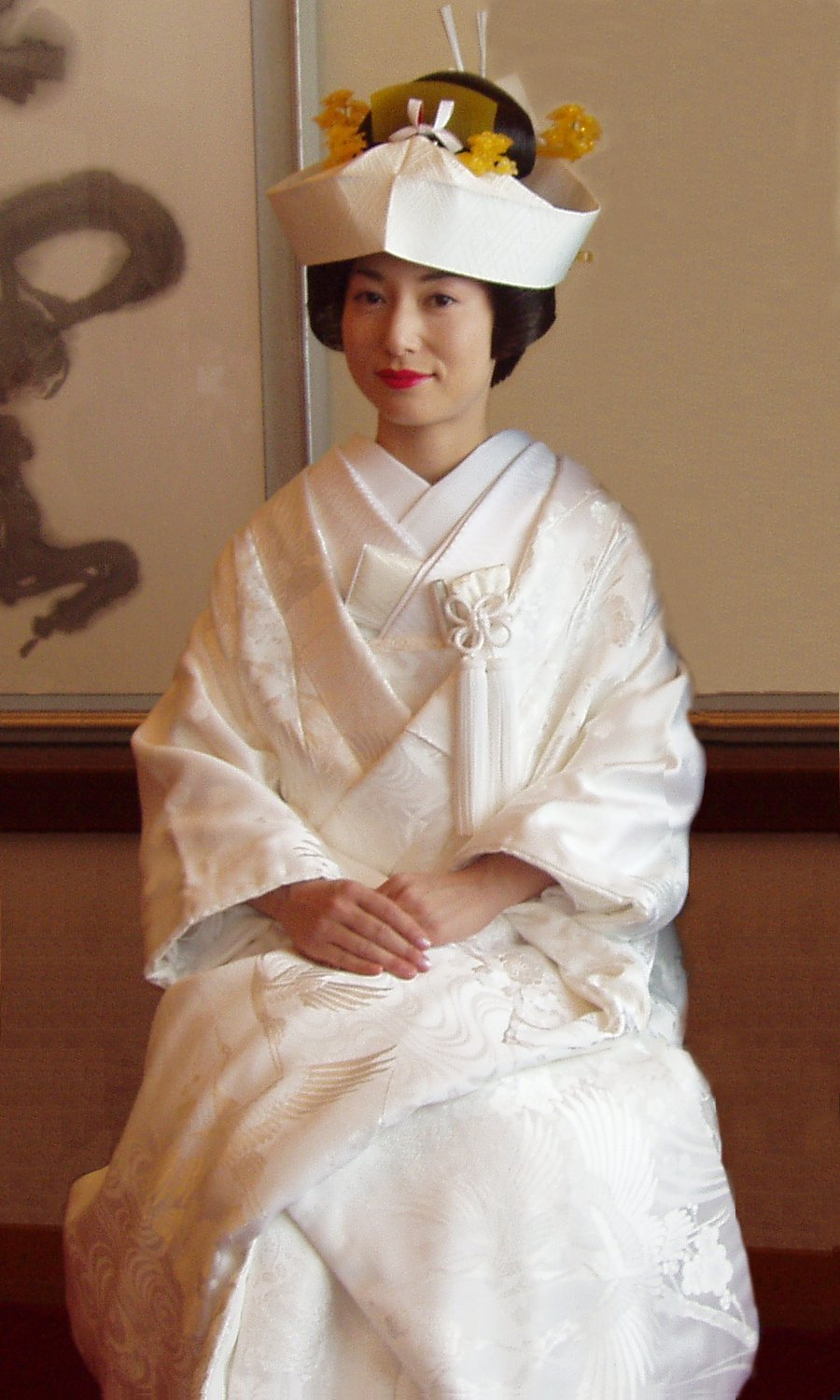
A shiromuku with tsunokakushi (wedding headpiece)

Shiromuku (白無垢, lit. 'white pure-innocence') are pure-white wedding kimonos worn by brides for a traditional Japanese Shinto wedding ceremony. Comparable to an uchikake and sometimes described as a white uchikake, the shiromuku is worn for the part of the wedding ceremony, symbolising the purity of the bride coming into the marriage. The bride may later change into a red uchikake after the ceremony to symbolise good luck.

A shiromuku will form part of a bridal ensemble with matching or coordinating accessories, such as a bridal katsura (bridal wig), a set of matching kanzashi (usually mock-tortoiseshell), and a sensu fan tucked into the kimono. Due to the expensive nature of traditional bridal clothing, few are likely to buy brand-new shiromuku; it is not unusual to rent kimono for special occasions, and Shinto shrines are known to keep and rent out shiromuku for traditional weddings. Those who do possess shiromuku already are likely to have inherited them from close family members.

==== Susohiki/Hikizuri (裾引き/引きずり) ====
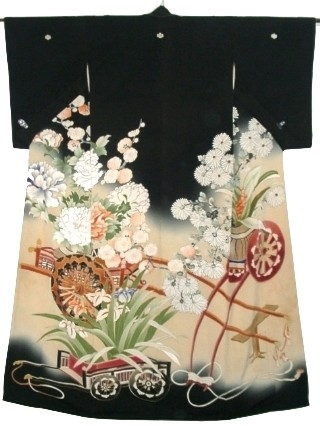
A geisha's formal susohiki kimono, displaying a kurotomesode-type pattern on the kimono's elongated skirt

Susohiki (lit. 'trailing skirt') (also known as hikizuri) are women's kimonos with a specialised construction that allows them to be worn trailing, with a deep-set and widely spaced collar. Susohiki are extremely long kimono worn by geisha, maiko, actors in kabuki and people performing traditional Japanese dance. A susohiki can be up to 230 cm (91 in) long, and are generally no shorter than 200 cm (79 in) from shoulder to hem; this is to allow the kimono to trail along the floor.

Susohiki are sewn differently to normal kimonos due to the way they are worn. The collar on a susohiki is sewn further and deeper back into the nape of the neck, so that it can be pulled down much lower without causing the front of the kimono to ride up. The sleeves are set unevenly onto the body, shorter at the back than at the front, so that the underarm does not show when the collar is pulled down.

Susohiki are tied differently when they are put on – whereas regular kimonos are tied with a visible ohashori, and the side seams are kept straight, susohiki are pulled up somewhat diagonally, to emphasise the hips and ensure the kimono trails nicely on the floor. A small ohashori is tied, larger at the back than the front, but it wrapped against the body with a momi (lit. 'red silk') wrap, which is then covered by the obi, rendering the ohashori invisible. (Note: Video reference showing Atami geisha Kyouma being dressed in hikizuri – the second video shows the difference between ohashori length at the front and back, showing how it is tied into the obi so as to be not visible.)

Aside from their specialised construction, susohiki can resemble many other types of women's kimono in their decoration, fabric type, colour and sleeve length. The susohiki worn by geisha and their apprentices are formal kimono worn to engagements, and so are always made of fine silk, resembling kimono of hōmongi formality and above in their pattern placement and background colour.

The susohiki worn by kabuki actors varies by role, and so can appear as the humble clothing of an Edo-period merchant's daughter, as well as the fine silk clothing of a samurai woman. These costumes may be made of polyester, as well as silk, informal silk fabrics, cotton, linen or hemp. Pattern placement, colour and design varies by role, with many roles having costume designs preserved from previous centuries.

The susohiki worn by people performing traditional Japanese dance typically feature a bold design in block colours, as their clothing must stand out from the stage. Performers performing in a group wear kimono identical to one another, with the bold designs creating visual unity between performers.

== Related garments and accessories ==
Though the kimono is the national dress of Japan, it has never been the sole item of clothing worn throughout Japan; even before the introduction of Western dress, many different styles of dress were worn, such as the attus of the Ainu people and the ryusou of the Ryukyuan people. Though similar to the kimono, these garments are distinguishable by their separate cultural heritage, and are not considered to be simply 'variations' of the kimono as the clothing worn by the working class is considered to be.

Some related garments still worn today were the contemporary clothing of previous time periods, and have survived in an official and/or ceremonial capacity, worn only on certain occasions by certain people. Accessories that can be worn with the kimono vary by occasion and use. Some are ceremonial, or worn only for special occasions, whereas others are part of dressing in the kimono and are used in a more practical sense.

Both geisha and maiko wear variations on common accessories that are not found in everyday dress. As an extension of this, many practitioners of Japanese traditional dance wear similar kimonos and accessories to geisha and maiko.

For certain traditional holidays and occasions some specific types of kimono accessories are worn. For instance, okobo, also known as pokkuri, are worn by girls for shichi-go-san, alongside brightly coloured furisode. Okobo are also worn by young women on seijin no hi (Coming of Age Day).

== Layering ==
Pre-WW2, kimonos were commonly worn layered, with three being the standard number of layers worn on top of the undergarments. The layered kimono underneath were known as nakagi, and were often a patchwork of older or unwearable kimono taken apart for their fabric. Specifically designed matching sets of formal layered kimonos were known as o-tsui, and generally featured the same design presented on different background colours, such as white (innermost), red (middle layer) and black (outermost). The innermost layers, known as shitagi, typically featured the plainest decorative techniques, such as dyework only, and the successive outer layers would feature techniques such as embroidery and couched gold thread, with the outermost layer – known as the uwagi – displaying the most extensive decoration. These matching sets would be designed and created together, commonly as part of a bride's outfit for a wedding. Extant intact sets of o-tsui kimonos are difficult to find, particularly in good condition, with the innermost kimono typically damaged and in poor condition.

In modern Japan, at least one layer is typically worn next to the skin when wearing kimono. Traditionally, this would be the hadagi or hadajuban, a tube-sleeved, wrapped-front garment considered to be underwear, though in the modern day, regular underwear is sometimes worn instead, and a traditional hadajuban is not considered strictly necessary. A hadajuban is typically made of something more washable than silk, such as cotton, hemp, linen or some synthetic fibres.

For all forms of kimono except the yukata (excluding high-quality yukata dressed up as komon), a nagajuban (lit. 'long juban'), often known and referred to as a juban, is worn over the top of any underwear. The juban resembles a kimono made of a lighter, thinner fabric, not uncommonly constructed without an okumi panel at the front, and often with a collar cover known as a han'eri sewn over its collar. The han'eri, visible at the neckline when worn underneath a kimono, is designed to be replaced and washed when needed.

In modern-day Japan, layered kimonos are generally only seen on the stage, whether for classical dances or in kabuki. A false second layer called a hiyoku (比翼, "second wing") may be attached instead of an entirely separate kimono to achieve this look; the hiyoku resembles the lower half of a kimono's lining which, and is sewn to the kimono horizontally along the back. A hiyoku may have a false collar attached to it, or a matching false collar sewn to the kimono separately, creating the illusion of layering at the neckline; separate false sleeve cuffs may also be sewn into the kimono to create this effect.

Kimonos featuring hiyoku can be seen in some kabuki performances such as Fuji Musume, where the kimono is worn with the okumi flipped back slightly underneath the obi to expose the design on the hiyoku. The hiyoku can be seen on some bridal kimonos.

== Care ==
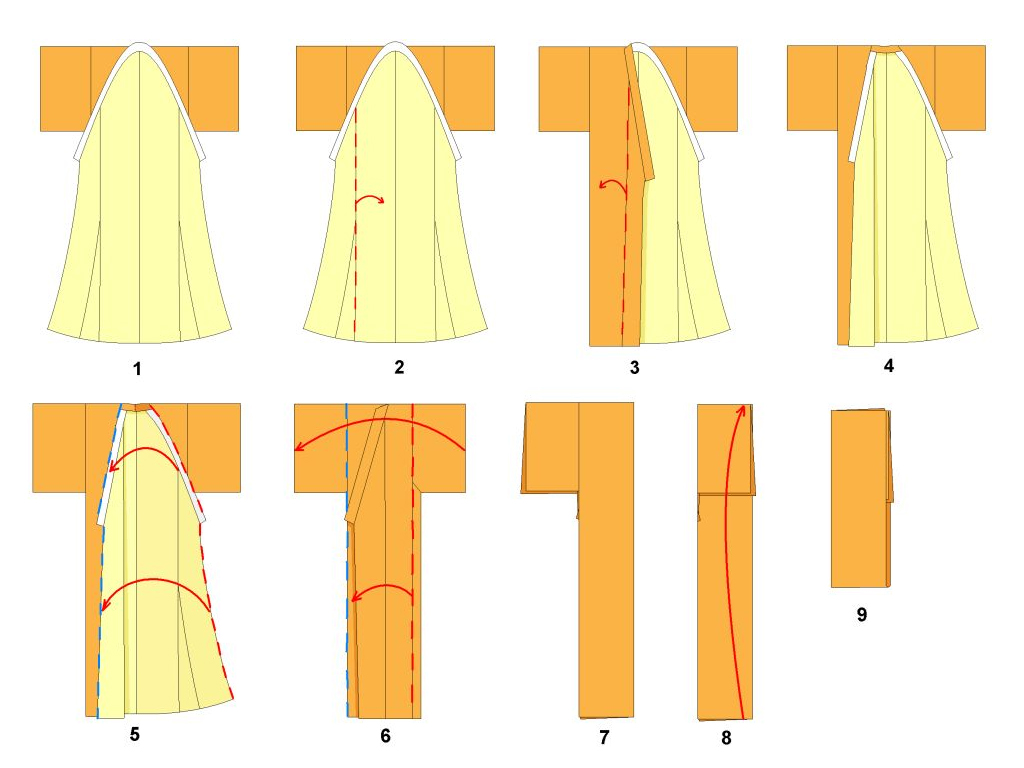
How to fold a kimono

In the past, a kimono would often be entirely taken apart for washing, and then re-sewn for wearing. This traditional washing method involves two steps: taking the kimono apart and washing each piece (toki arai) and then stretching each piece of a kimono onto a board to dry after they have been washed and starched (arai hari). Because the stitches must be taken out for washing, traditional kimono need to be hand sewn. The process of traditionally washing kimono is very expensive and difficult and is one of the causes of the declining popularity of kimono. Modern fabrics and cleaning methods have been developed that eliminate this need, although the traditional washing of kimono is still practised, especially for high-end garments.

New, custom-made kimono are generally delivered to a customer with long, loose basting stitches placed around the outside edges. These stitches are called shitsuke ito (not to be confused with kazari jitsuke, the small white prickstitching seen along the collar of kurotomesode). They are sometimes replaced for storage. They help to prevent bunching, folding and wrinkling, and keep the kimono's layers in alignment.

Like many other traditional Japanese garments, there are specific ways to fold kimono. These methods help to preserve the garment and to keep it from creasing when stored. Kimonos are often stored wrapped in acid-free paper envelopes known as tatōshi.

Kimono need to be aired out at least seasonally and before and after each time they are worn. Many people prefer to have their kimono dry cleaned. Although this can be extremely expensive, it is generally less expensive than the traditional method of taking a kimono apart to clean it. This may, however, be impossible for certain fabrics or dyes.

== Sanchi, kimono production regions ==
Kimonos are produced in different regions all over Japan. Locations known for making kimonos are often called sanchi. Many of these regional variations still exist today and are recognised as meibutsu, famous products of their place of origin.

Name	Kanji	Location	Notes
Kumejima-tsumugi	久米島紬	Kumejima, Okinawa	
Yaeyama Jofu	八重山上布	Yaeyama, Okinawa	Made of both hand and machine spun ramie thread and hand woven.
Miyako Jofu	宮古上布	Miyako, Okinawa	Made of hand spun ramie thread, indigo dyed and hand woven.
Oitama	置賜	Yamagata	Including: Benibana tsumugi; Heiyōgasuri; Itajime kogasuri; Kusakizome tsumugi; Shirataka itajime kogasuri; Yokosogasuri
Shiozawa tsumugi	塩沢島紬	Shiozawa, Niigata	
Kurume-Gasuri	久留米絣	Kurume, Fukuoka	Cotton Kimono known for often hand woven kasuri
Ushikubi tsumugi	牛首紬	Hakusan, Ishikawa	
Yūki-tsumugi	結城紬	Yūki, Ibaraki	Yūki-tsumugi kimonos are often made with thread spun by hand. It can take up to three months to make enough thread for one kimono by an experienced weaver.
Ōshima-tsumugi	大島紬	Amami Ōshima	Ōshima Tsumugi kimonos are dyed with mud and dyed from the bark of Sharinbai Tree creating a deep black color. Mud dyed kasuri threads are hand woven together to create patterns.

== Outside Japan ==
Kimonos are worn by Japanese Americans, and by other members of the Japanese diaspora overseas, such as Japanese in the Philippines. Kimonos are worn to Shinto ceremonies by Japanese Brazilians in Curitiba, Paraná.

Kimonos are collected in the same way as Japanese hobbyists by some non-Japanese, and may be worn to events such as Kimono de Jack gatherings.

== See also ==
- Jūnihitoe
- Kosode
- List of items traditionally worn in Japan
- List of Traditional Crafts of Japan
- Sokutai
