= Bolt (cloth) =

Roll of fabric

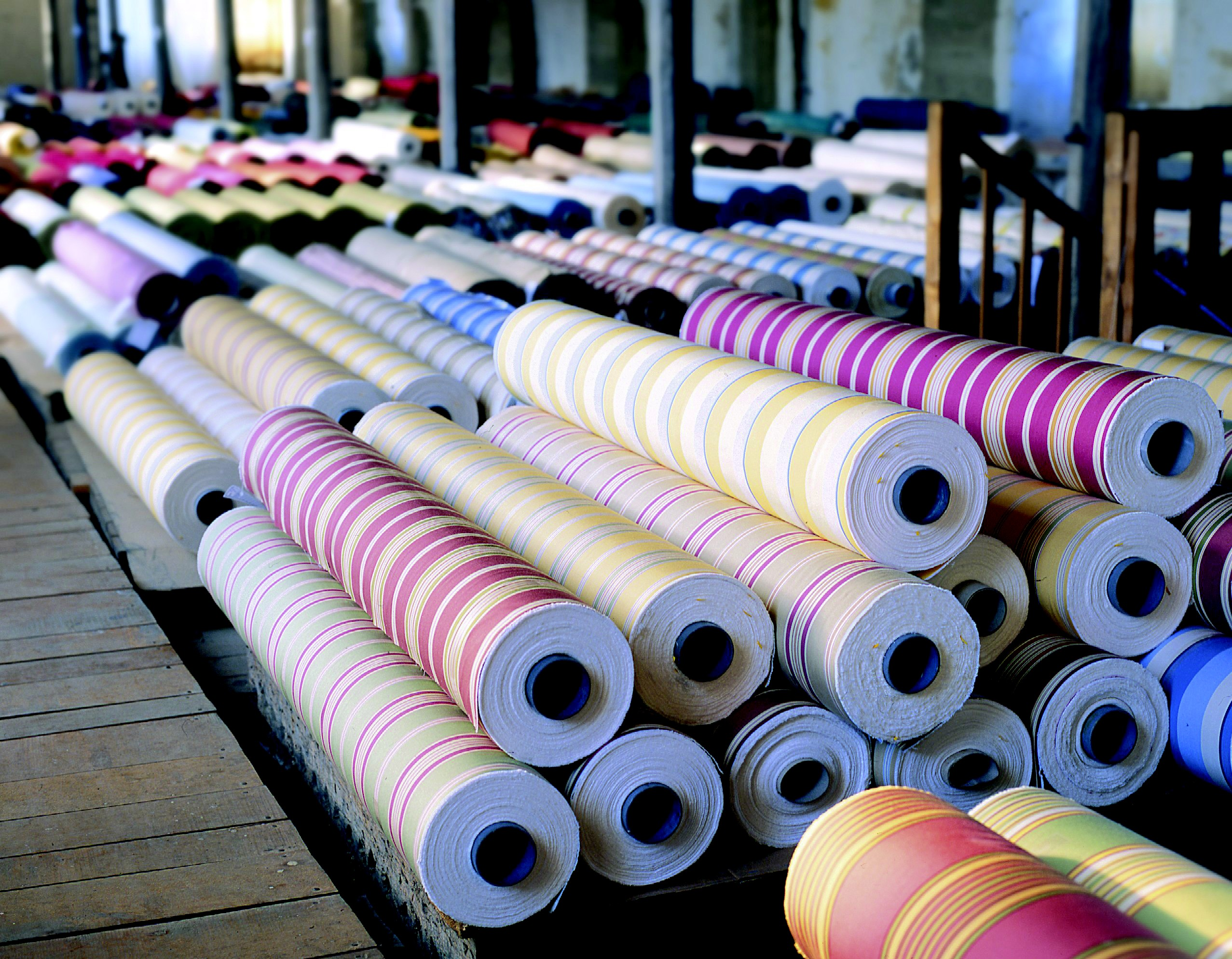
Rolls leaving the factory, 2014

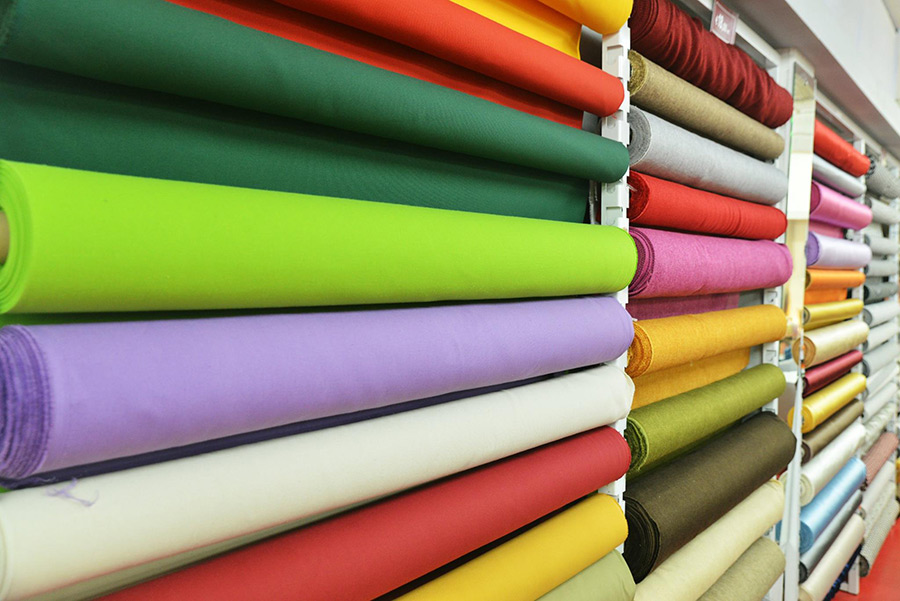
Rolls on retail sale, 2019

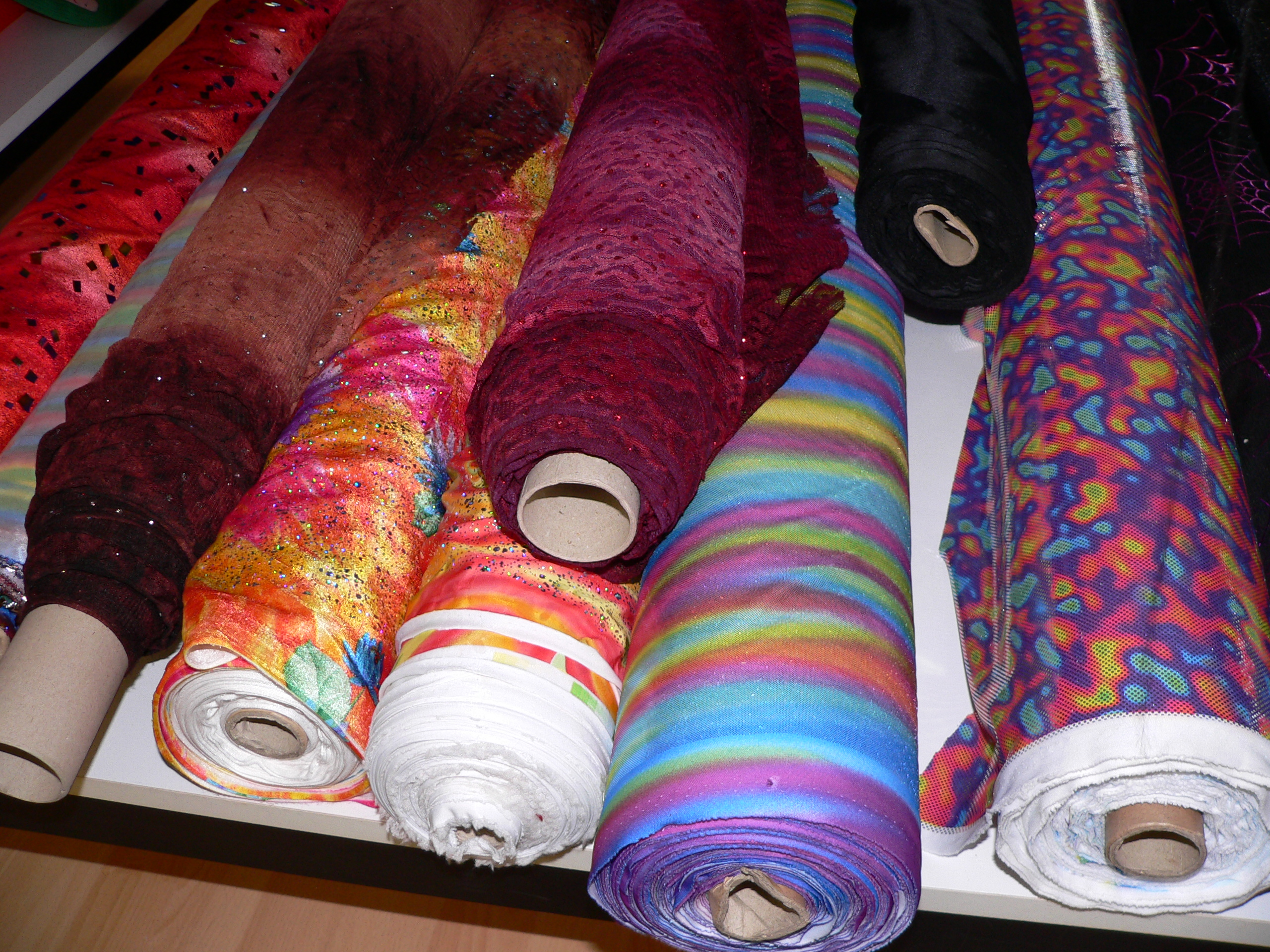
Specialty cloth; velvet, cloth with sparkles, etc.

A bolt is a piece of cloth woven on a loom or created by a knitting machine, as it is processed, stored or marketed. Consequently, its dimensions are highly variable – flexible and dependent upon the manufacturing, machinery, quantity, size, thickness and quality of the product. It is a unit used in manufacturing, transport and inventory. It is also used as a descriptor for wallpaper, which uses different fabrication machinery. (Note: Wallpaper is not necessarily fabric. It uses different fabrication machinery. Wallpaper is packaged in single, double or triple bolts or rolls. Lengths and widths vary depending on the manufacturer and product. There are two competing systems: American and Euro (Metric). The former contains about 25% more than the latter. Each bolt contains a label that indicates the dye lot, pattern number or run number.) Being encompassing, it is by its nature a generic and ambiguous term of convenience and context, used to describe fabric and wallpaper.

== In modern production ==
Textile manufacturing is about converting fiber into yarn, yarn into fabric, and finally, the fabric into clothing and other useful products. At every stage, production activity is managed by unique batches. When it comes to fabric, a set of bolts or rolls forms a batch, representing the production.

=== Manufacturing ===
The yarn is processed by knitting or weaving, which turns the yarn into cloth. The machine used for weaving is the loom. and knitting is another method of cloth manufacturing.

Bolts (Note: Encarta opines that in textiles, it means "a rolled length of woven goods or wallpaper." Bolt has been defined as “A bolt of cloth is a long wide piece of it that is wound into a roll round a piece of cardboard.” Bolt "in the sense of bale" is a noun. E.g., "bolts of black silk" with synonyms that include: amount, bale, packet, quantity, reel, and roll. The foregoing list only scratches the surface of synonyms for Bolt as it relates to fabrics.)are the rolls of cloth manufactured by a loom or knitting machine, which moves through subsequent processes of textile finishing.

==== Loom ====
Looms are equipped with devices that can measure the length of the bolt during manufacturing on the machine itself.

=== Packing and trading ===
Cloth merchant were marking the end of bolts with notations. This practice is continued in the industry to avoid mixing.

=== Garment manufacturing ===
After fabric inspection, the bolts are layered manually or fabric-spreading machines for relaxing and cutting with patterns.

For more information, see Pattern; Ready-made garment

== Unit ==
The length of a bolt varied according to the type of material measured. The length is usually either 40 or 100 yards (37 or 91 m), but varies depending on the fabric being referred to; for example, a bolt of canvas is traditionally 39 yards (36 m).

The width of a bolt is usually 45 or 60 inches (110 or 150 cm), but widths may include 35–36 inches (89–91 cm), 39 inches (99 cm), 41 inches (100 cm), 44–45 inches (110–110 cm), 50 inches (130 cm), 52–54 inches (130–140 cm), 58–60 inches (150–150 cm) and 66 inches (170 cm), 72 inches (180 cm), 96 inches (240 cm), and 108 inches (270 cm). For more on breadths of bolts, see narrow cloth.

The word has been long-lived. For example, Herman Melville used it casually in Moby-Dick. It is also the standard linear measurement of canvas for use at sea: 39 yards (36 m).

== See also ==
- Piece goods
- Greige goods
- Fabric inspection
- Tanmono - In Japan case.
