= Rinzu =

Silk satin fabric of Japan

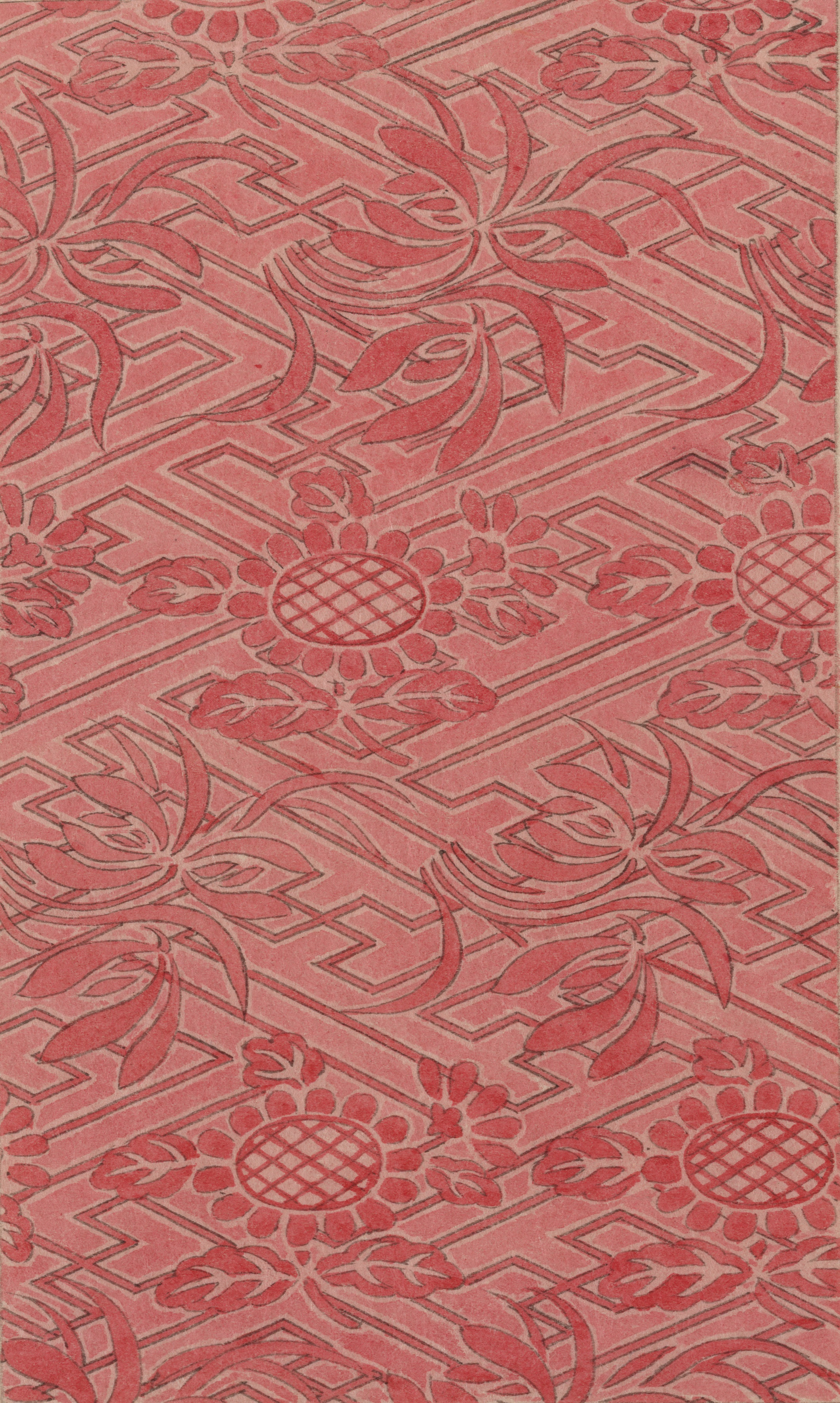
Woodblock print (between c. 1100 and 1400) illustrating a stylized floral design used in rinzu fabric

Rinzu (綸子) is a Japanese silk satin damask. It was the preferred fabric for kimono in the Edo period.
