= Yamafuji =

Yamafuji (Japanese: 山藤) is a Japanese surname. Notable people with the surname include:

- Hiromi Yamafuji (1944–1984), Japanese cyclist
- Kenta Yamafuji (born 1986), Japanese footballer
- Shoji Yamafuji (1937-2024), Japanese illustrator
