= Tsumugi (cloth) =

Japanese cloth woven from hand-joined slub silk threads

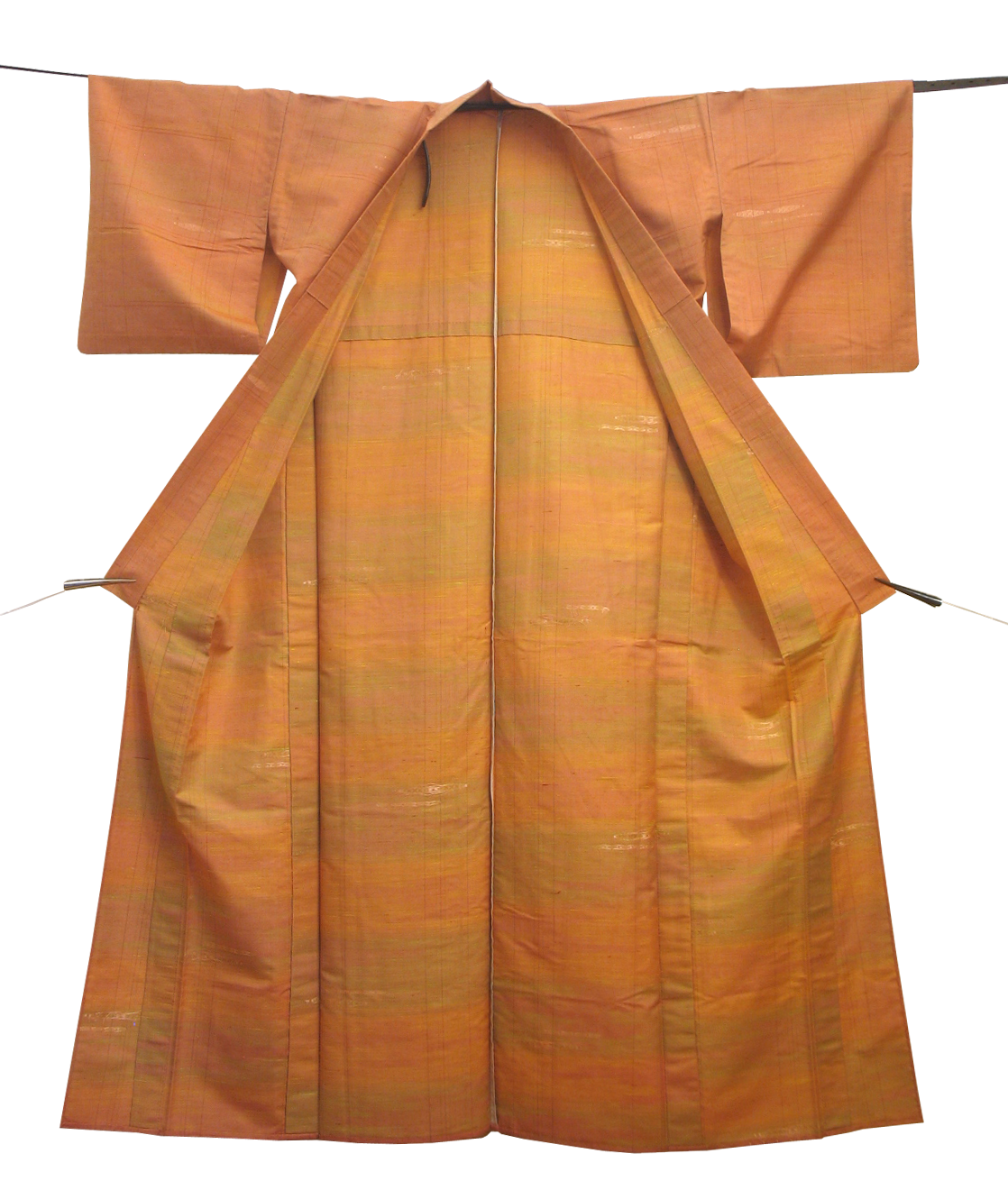
An unlined (hitoe) kimono made from tsumugi, showing soft drape.

Tsumugi (紬) is a traditional plain weave silk fabric from Japan. The yarn used is made short to medium staple from silk fibres, such as damaged cocoons and the waste left over from the reeling of filament silk. The fibres are degummed and spun into yarn. Yarns spun from short-staple fibres tend to have slubs similar to wild silk. Because of this structure, tsumugi is rough-surfaced, soft and drapey, softening further with age.

Between 1910 and 1925 (late Taishō to Shōwa era), it became common to spin as well as weave silk noil by machine (see meisen for the technological developments that made this possible). This machine-spun meisen cloth largely displaced tsumugi as one of the cheapest silk fabrics. Prices dropped drastically, and silk materials and clothing was suddenly within the budget of most Japanese; stores also began to sell off-the-peg, ready-to-wear kimono at about this time.

Originally, tsumugi was homemade from domestic or wild-gathered silkworm cocoons that had been broken by hatching or were irregularly formed. Unlike the long-fiber silk, such cloth was permitted to peasants. Traditionally a peasant cloth, handmade tsumugi is very labour-intensive to produce, and has become expensive over time, valued as a luxury folk-craft.

== In the kimono canon ==
The term tsumugi is broadly used to describe many types of casual woven kimono, even if they do not use tsumugi silk. One of the most famous examples is Ōshima-tsumugi, which though considered a tsumugi is not made with tsumugi thread. Additionally, cotton kimono with fine kasuri patterns are considered to be tsumugi.

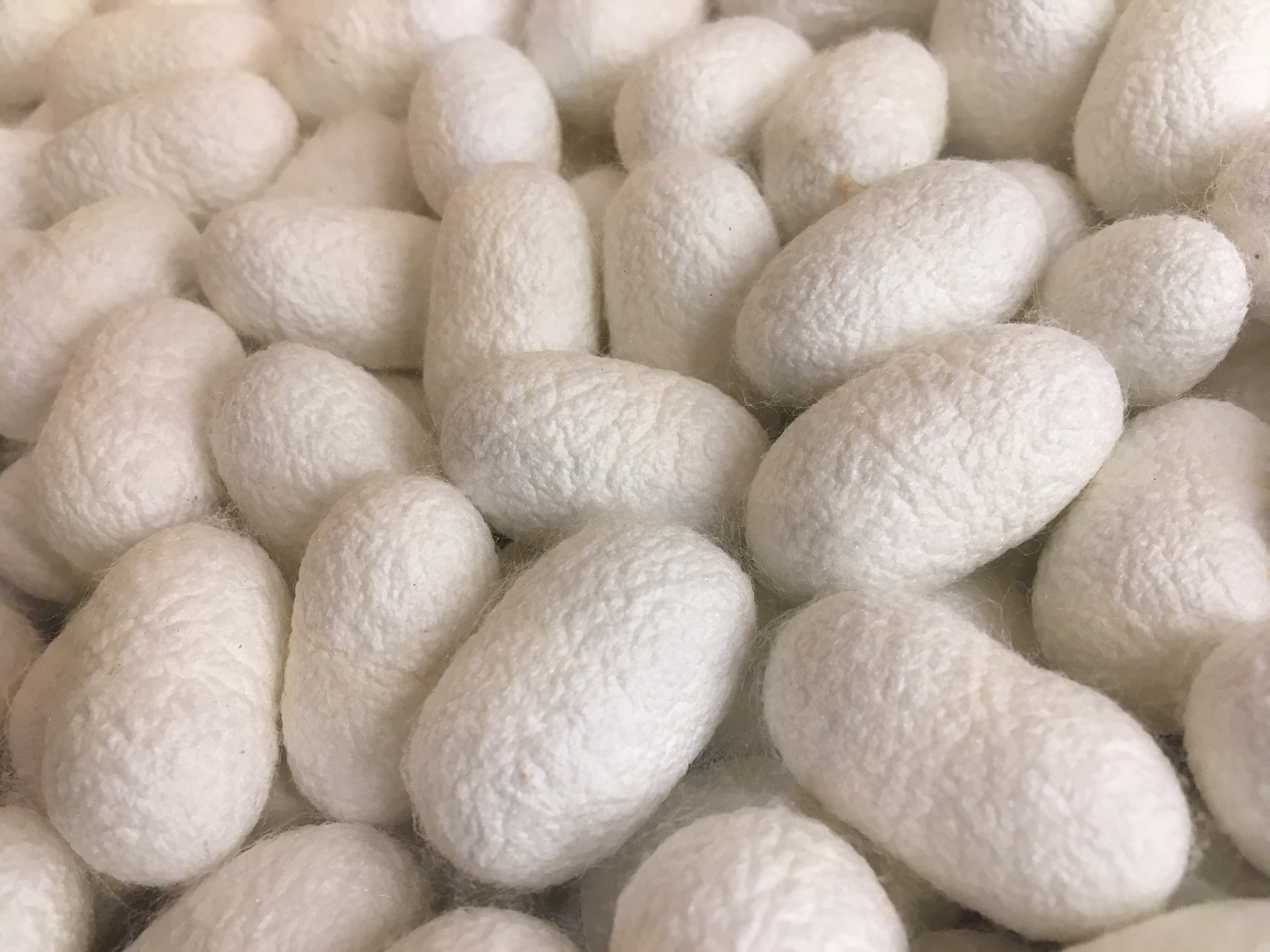
Silkworm cocoons in Japan for Yuki tsumugi

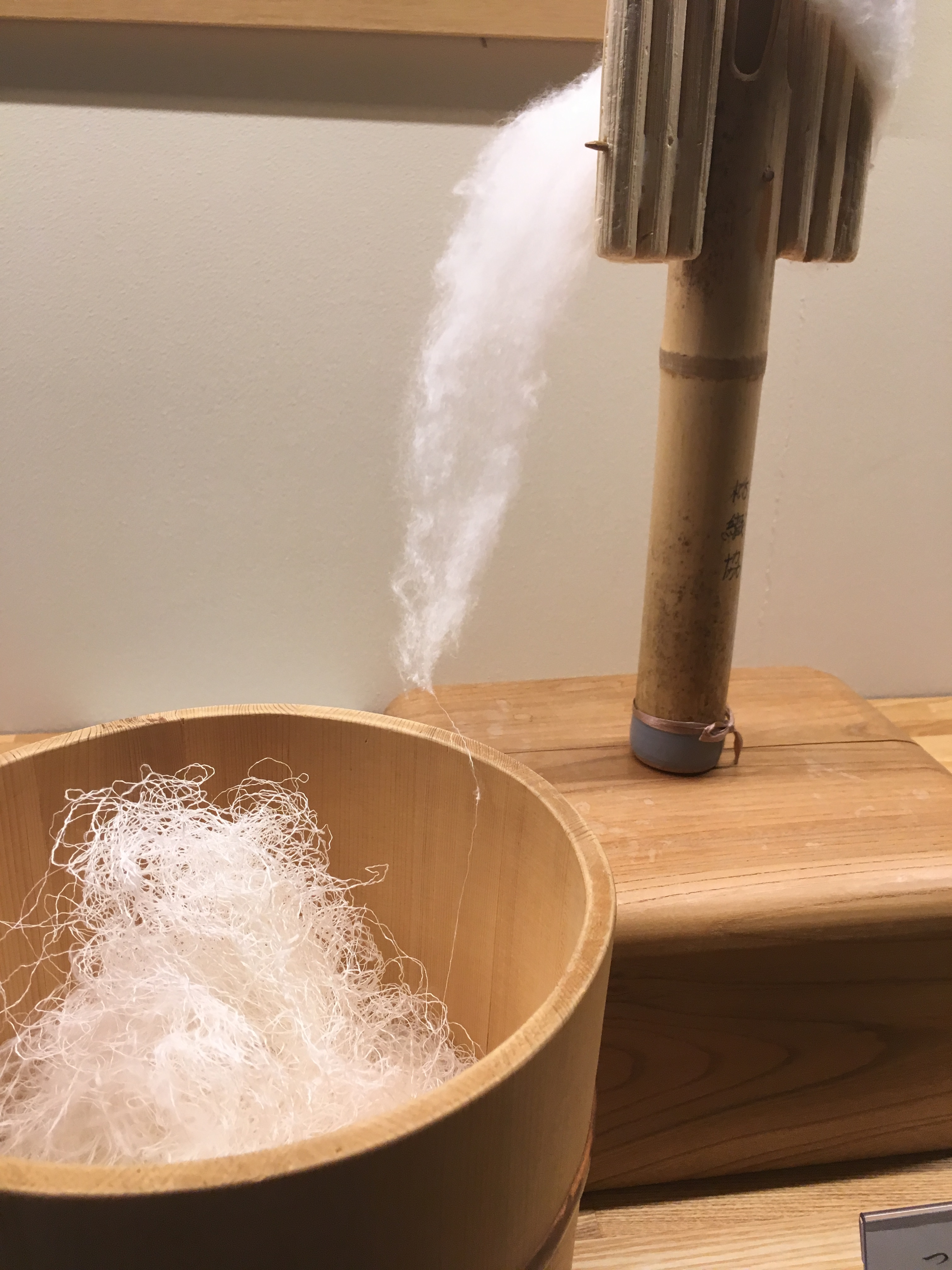
Handspinning silk noil for tsumugi thread

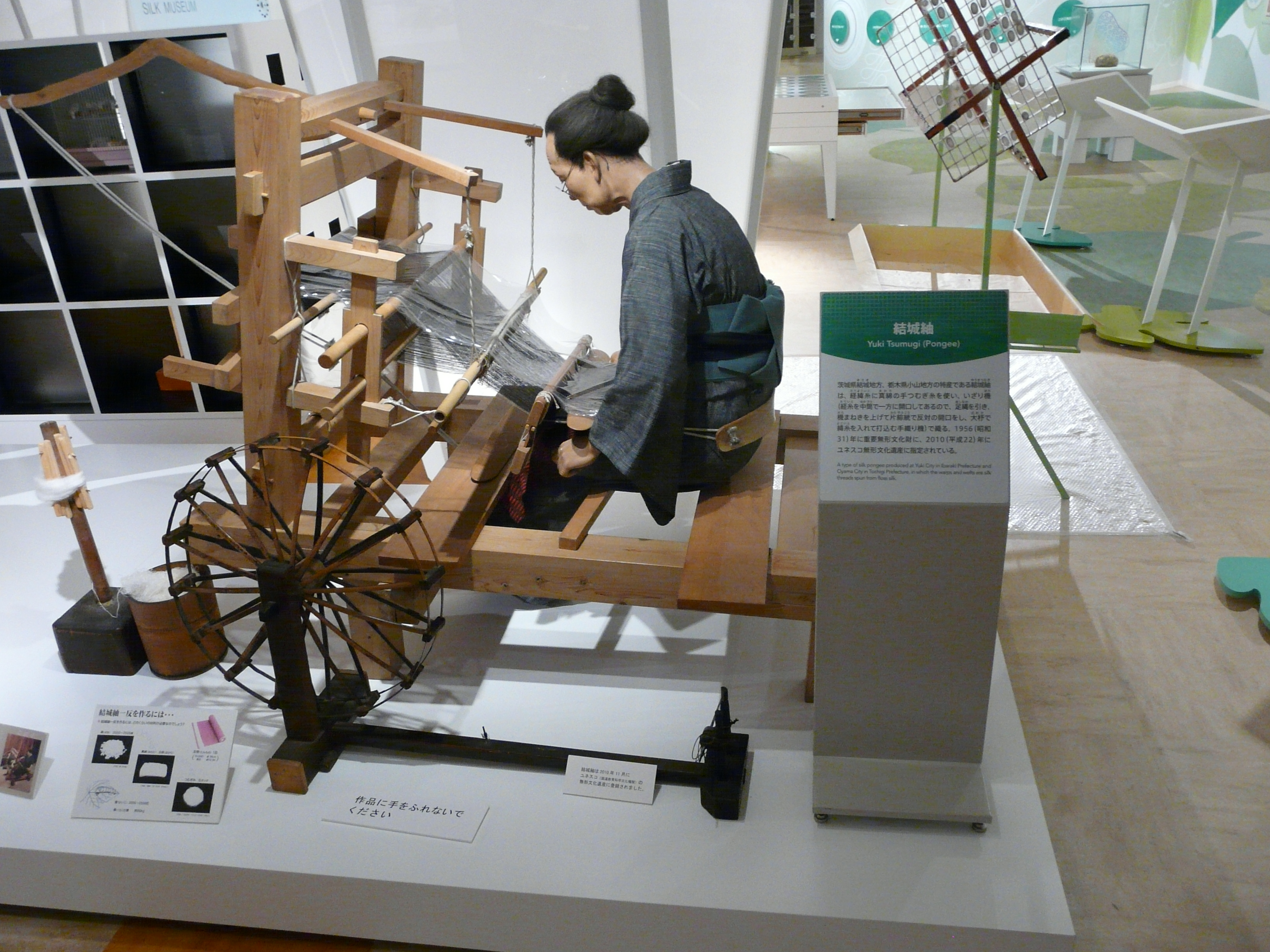
Weaving tsumugi cloth at a jibata (low loom), later largely replaced by takahata (high looms).

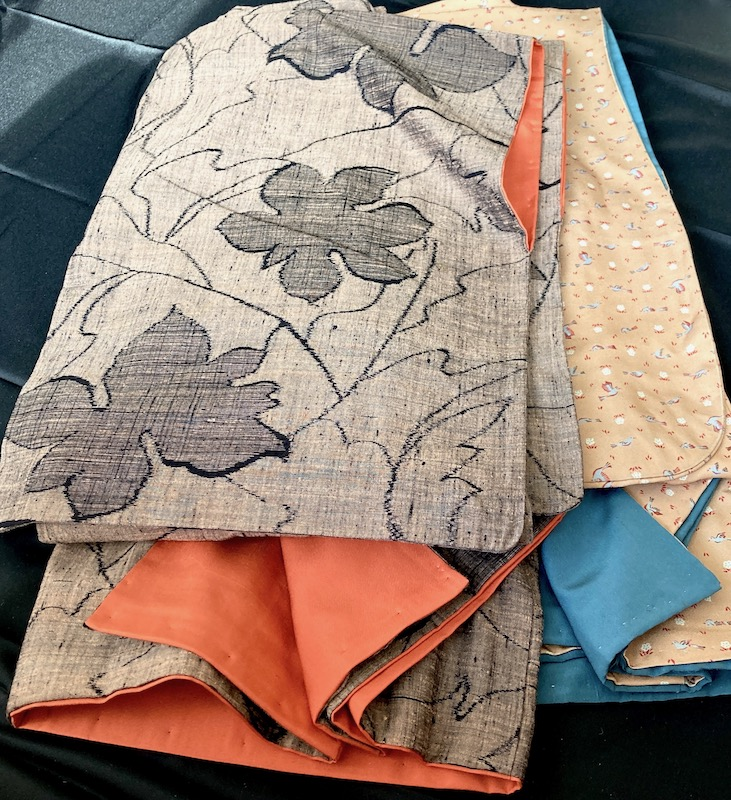
A lined (awase) tsumugi kimono.

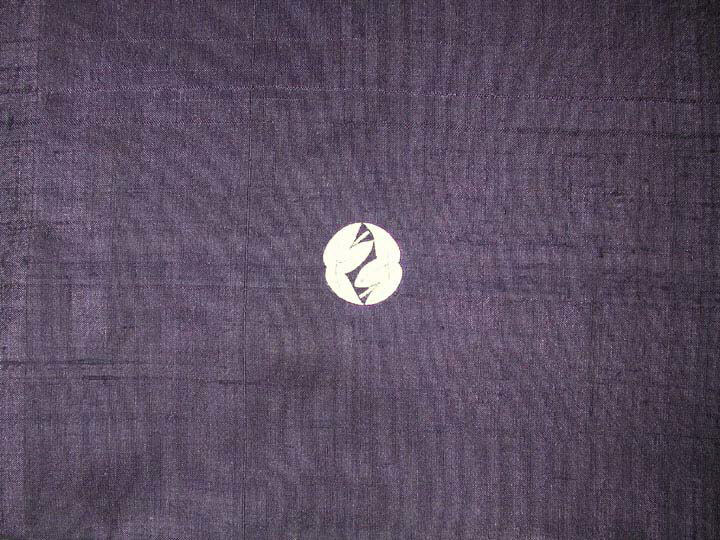
Tsumugi with a dyed mon

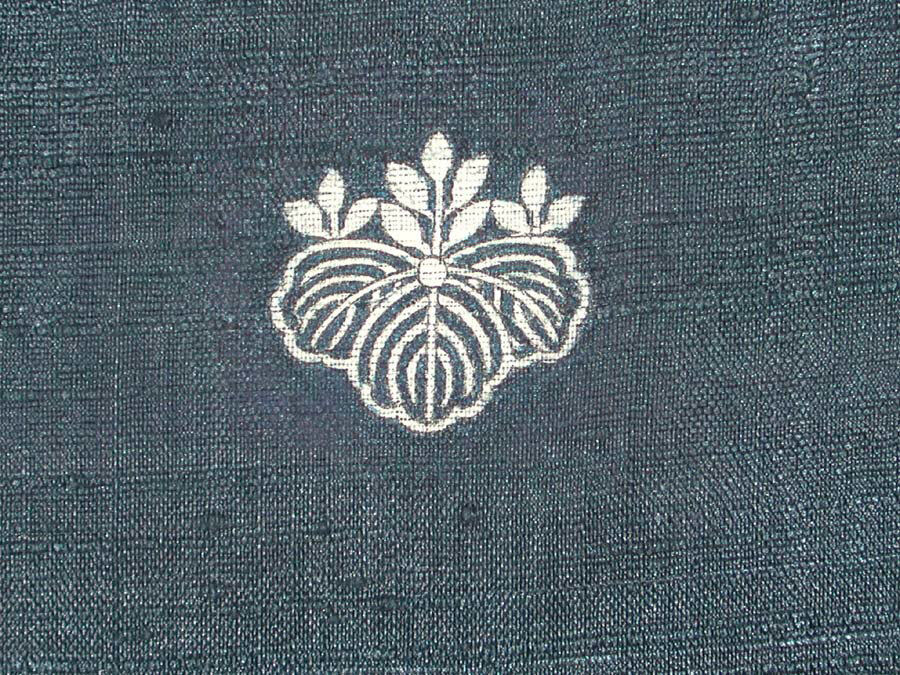
Tsumugi with a dyed mon, showing slight unevenness in thread diameter.

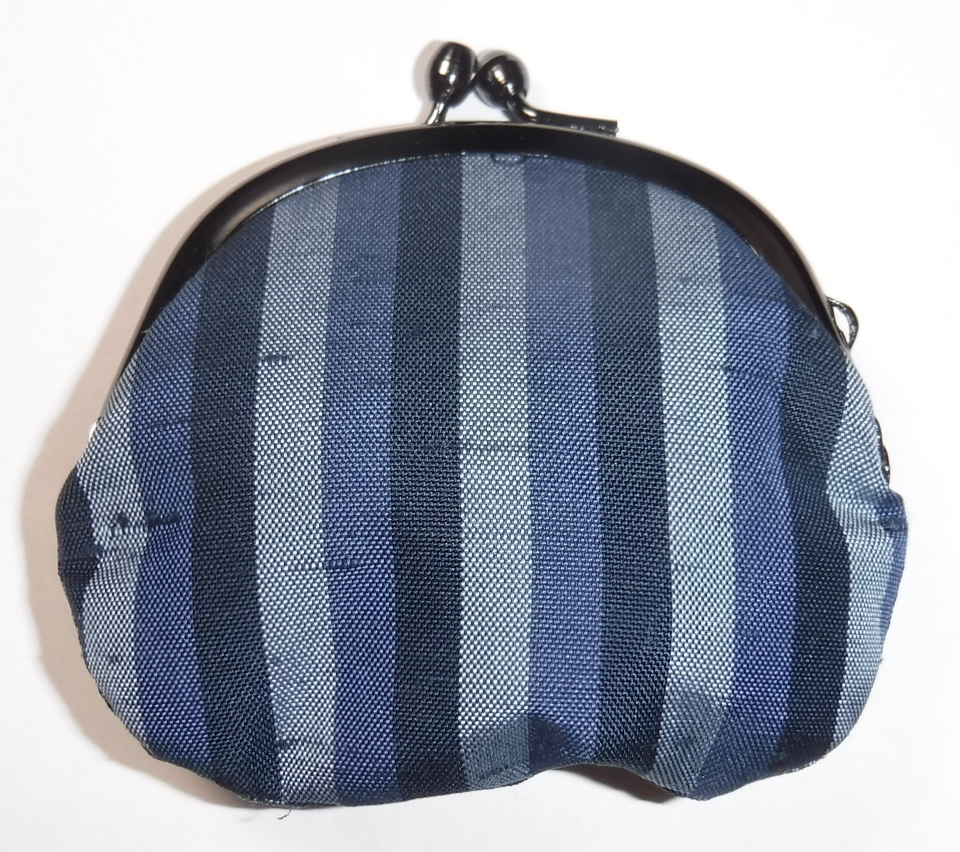
Coin purse made from tsumugi. The thicker portions of yarn visible in the weave are called slubs.

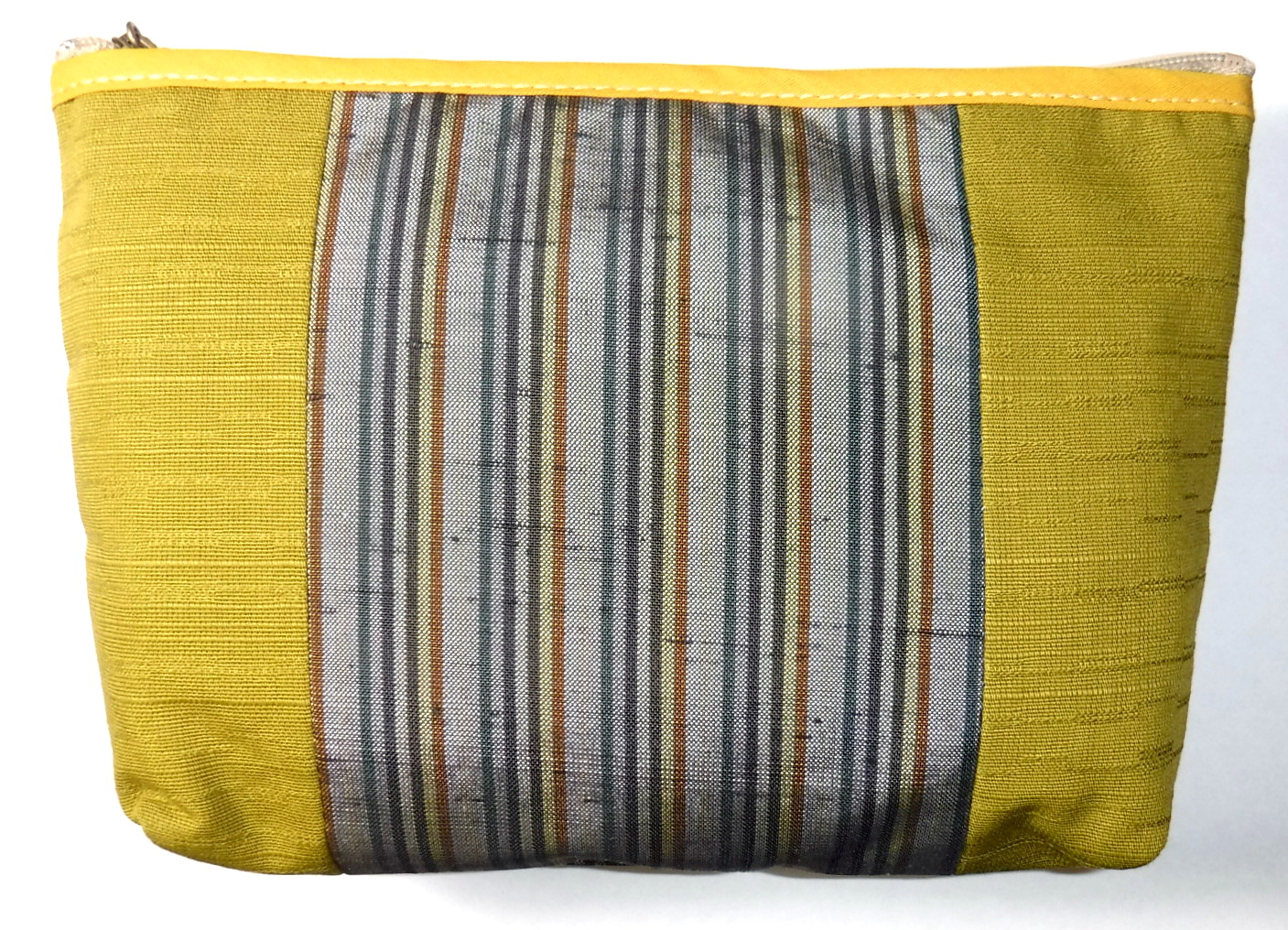
Another purse with woven stripes

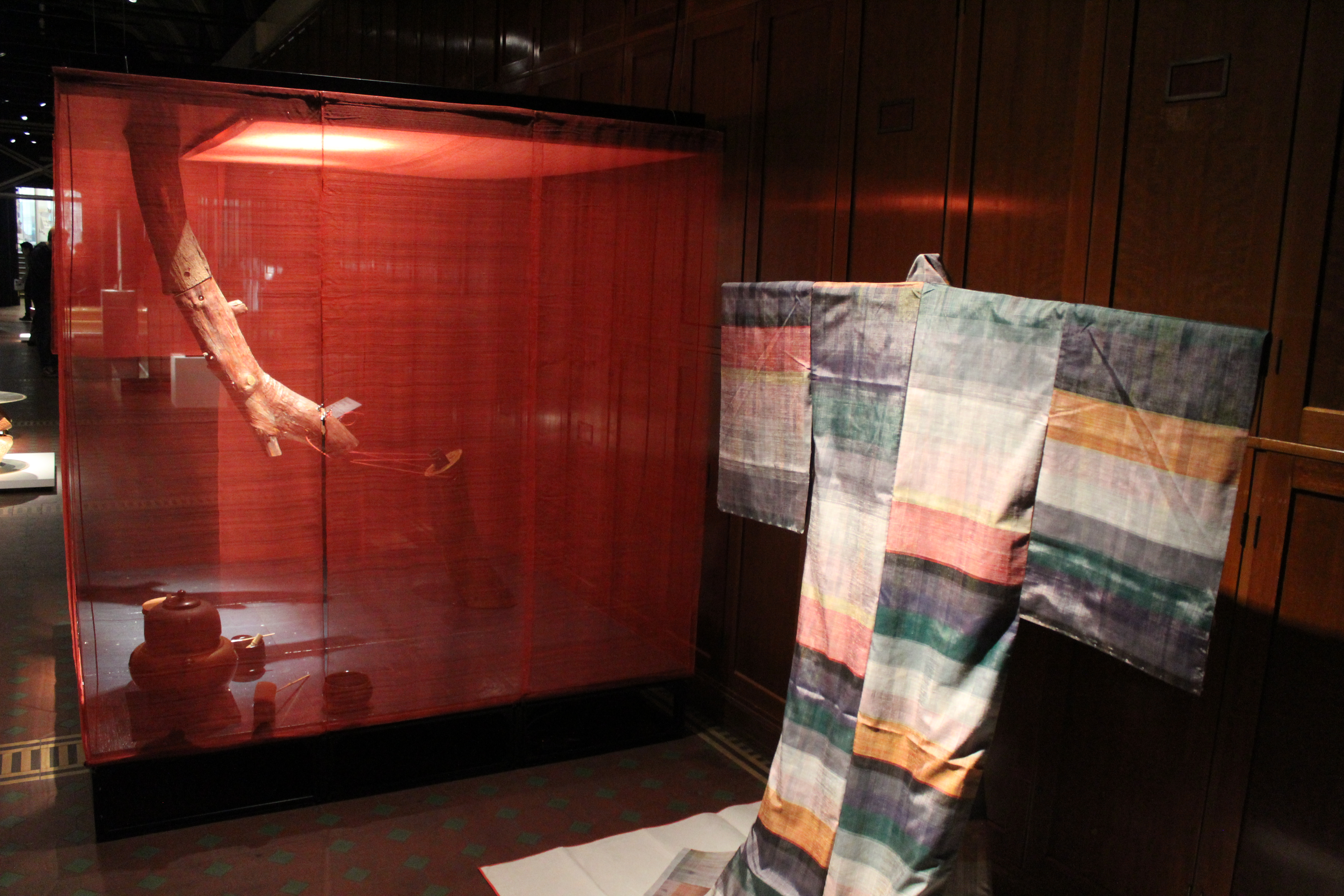
Mobile tea room and kimono made with Oitama Tsumugi

== Regional varieties (産地） ==
Tsumugi was originally a homespun textile, produced using silk fibre deemed unusable for the production of finer fabrics, and many regional variations existed. Some of these regional variations still exist today and are recognized as meibutsu, famous products of their place of origin.

Name	Kanji	Traditional sites	Notes	Example image
Amiito tsumugi		Shiga Prefecture	Recycled weft threads respun and rewoven to make obi.	
Gujo tsumugi	郡上島紬	Hachiman, Gifu		
Honba oshima tsumugi	本場大島紬	Amami, Kagoshima		
Iida tsumugi	飯田島紬	Iida, Nagano		
Kumejima-tsumugi	久米島紬	Kumejima, Okinawa	Hand woven silk tsumugi dyed with natural dyes.	
Murayama-oshima tsumugi	村山大島紬	Musashimurayama, Tokyo	Silk tsumugi woven in the style of Ōshima-tsumugi woven in Tokyo.	
Oitama tsumugi	置賜紬	Oitama regions of production: Hakutaka, Yamagata; Nagai, Yamagata; Yonezawa, Yamagata	Oitama tsumugi is a collective term for six different varieties of tsumugi made in the Yamagata region, including: Benibana tsumugi; Heiyōgasuri; Itajime kogasuri; Kusakizome tsumugi; Shirataka itajime kogasuri; Yokosogasuri	
Ojiya tsumugi	小千谷島紬	Ojiya, Niigata		
Shinshu tsumugi	信州紬	Nagano Prefecture		
Shiozawa tsumugi	塩沢島紬	Shiozawa, Niigata		
Tamba-Nuno	丹波布	Tanba	Hand pulled cotton threads, dyed with natural dyes and woven into stripes and checks. Hand pulled silk threads are also woven into only the weft.	
Tosa men tsumugi		Kagami, Kōchi (Kami)		
Ueda tsumugi	上田島紬	Ueda, Nagano	Ueda tsumugi is always striped and is sometimes referred to as ueda jima (jima meaning "stripes").	
Ushikubi tsumugi	牛首紬	Hakusan, Ishikawa		
Yūki-tsumugi	結城紬	Yūki, Ibaraki	Yūki-tsumugi kimono are often made with thread spun by hand. It can take up to three months to make enough thread for one kimono by an experienced weaver.	
Ōshima-tsumugi	大島紬	Amami Ōshima	Ōshima Tsumugi kimono are dyed with mud and dyed from the bark of Sharinbai Tree creating a deep black color. Mud dyed kasuri threads are hand woven together to create patterns.	

== Independent Tsumugi Weavers (Sakka,作家） ==
- Junko Ebigase海老ケ瀬順子
- Miyuki Otaka 大高美由紀
- Shinya Yanagi 柳晋哉
- Junko Tsuchiya 土屋順子
- Ryoko Murakami 村上良子
- Yaeko Hirayama 平山八重子

== See also ==
- Dupioni
- Pongee
- Shantung
- List of Traditional Crafts of Japan
