= Pongee =

Type of slub-woven fabric

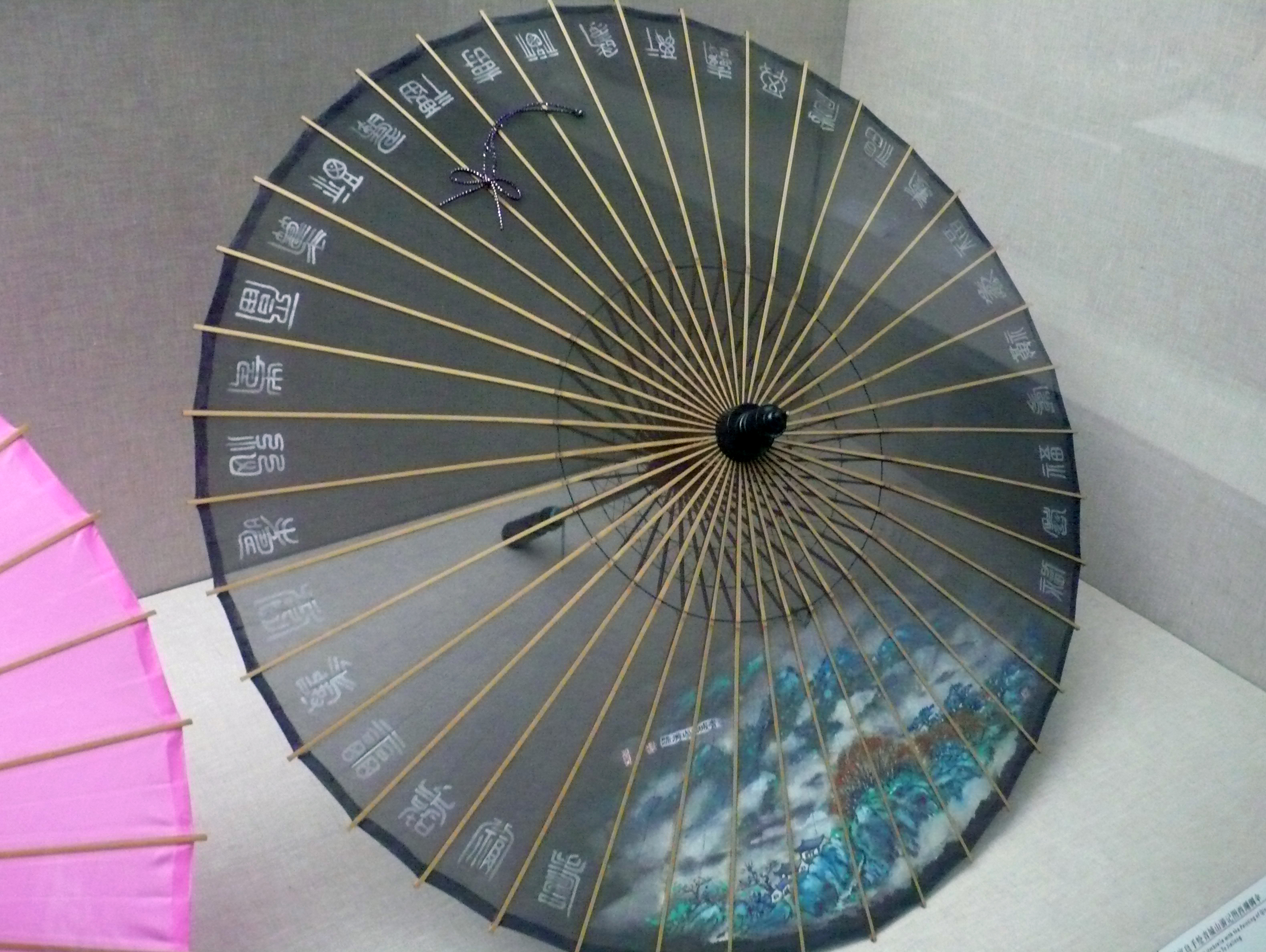
Pongee umbrella

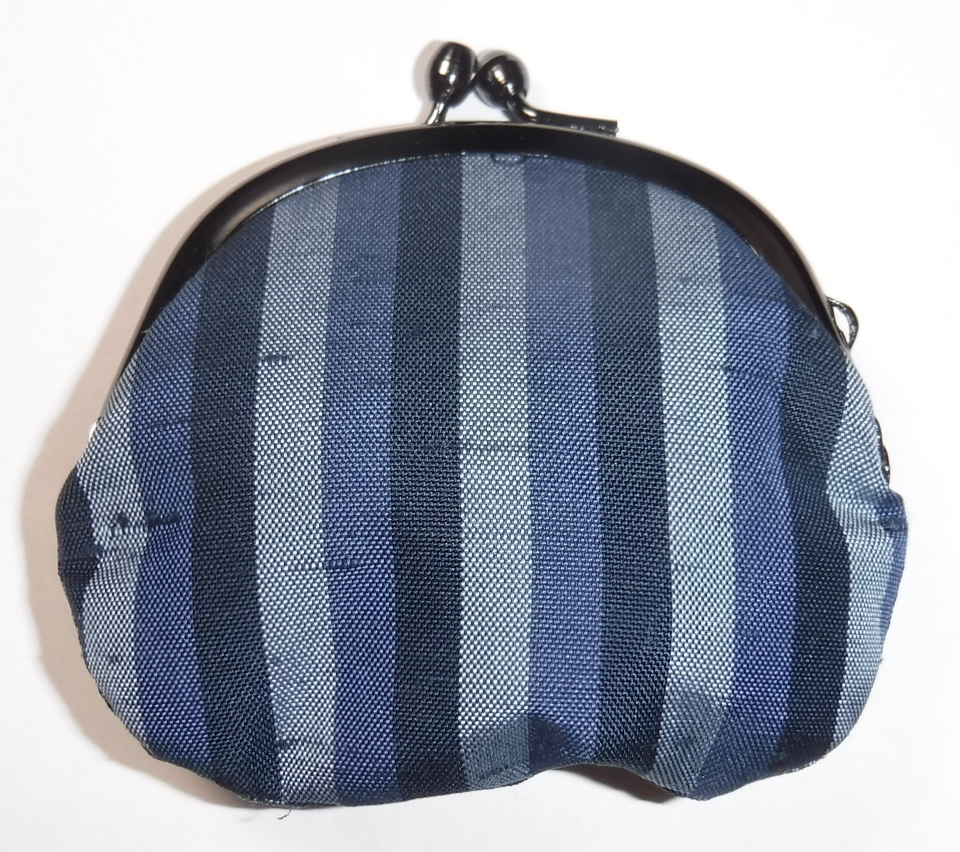
Tsumugi of Ushikubi, showing slubs

Pongee is a type of slub-woven fabric, created by weaving with yarns that have been spun by varying the tightness of the yarn's twist at various intervals. Pongee is typically made from silk, and results in a textured, "slubbed" appearance; pongee silks range from appearing similar to satin to appearing matte and unreflective. Though pongee is typically made out of silk, it can be woven from a variety of fabrics, such as cotton, linen and wool. Originally pongee was hand woven.

In the early 20th century, pongee was an important export from China to the United States. Pongee is still woven in silk by many mills across China, especially along the banks of the Yangtze River at mills in Sichuan, Anhui, Zhejiang and Jiangsu provinces.

Pongee varies in weight from 36 to 50 grams per square metre (0.12 to 0.16 oz/sq ft); lighter variants are known as Paj.

== Pongee types ==
Pongee is created through weaving yarns that have been twisted unevenly at various points; the resulting fabric typically has horizontal "slubs" running along the weft, where yarns increase and decrease in thickness.

Pongee fabrics vary in their weight, fibre types, weave and yarn types; though some types of pongee display large, visible slubs, others, such as tsumugi, may only display minimally varying yarn thickness, resulting in a still-textured, but far more uniform, pongee fabric.

== See also ==
- Kumejima-tsumugi
- Yūki-tsumugi
- List of Traditional Crafts of Japan
