= Antique satin =

Reversible satin-weave fabric made with slubbed weft yarns

Antique satin, also called satin-back shantung, is any five- or eight-harness (shaft) satin weave that uses slubbed or unevenly spun yarns in the weft (filling). It is reversible in that one side is satin and the other is shantung. It is used for simulating 17th and 18th century silks, and clothing such as blouses, lingerie and evening wear.

== History ==
Antique satin was developed in the 1950s by combining acetate (warp threads) and rayon (weft threads) and was used mainly as a decorative fabric for draperies. Unlike wedding satin with the shiny weave visible, antique satin has small slubs or textures on the face. The most popular yarn was known as 19/2 ply, meaning 19 threads to the inch woven as a two ply thread to create an appearance similar to silk. The most popular, highest-quality style is 48" wide and first appeared in limited colors. In the late 1950s a company named Penco Fabrics, owned by Jack Penzer and based at the drapery building, 261 Fifth Avenue, New York City, introduced antique satin in 101 colors, transforming the industry. The fabric was copied by others including Fame Fabrics and Richloom, now a major supplier, and by 1963 achieved major distribution throughout the United States. Selling at the mill level for $.59 to $.79 a yard, whether in the natural off-white, undyed, fabric to black and colored warp yards with an iridescent effect at the higher price points, the fabric in its basic form remains somewhat popular today.

== Character ==
This fabric is heavy and dull, and is sensitive to damage from water (which leaves white rings) and light (which shreds it and changes the fabric color). Therefore, antique satin cannot be washed and should be cleaned by a professional fabric expert. The lining is also sewn into the hem so if the lining is altered, the fabric will be damaged. It is usually an upholstery-weight fabric and can be made using silk, rayon or acetate for the warp, and coarser cotton or manmade fibers for the weft. It is a satin-faced version of shantung or duppioni. The name refers to the fabric's handspun and hand woven appearance.
