= Meisen =

Type of silk fabric

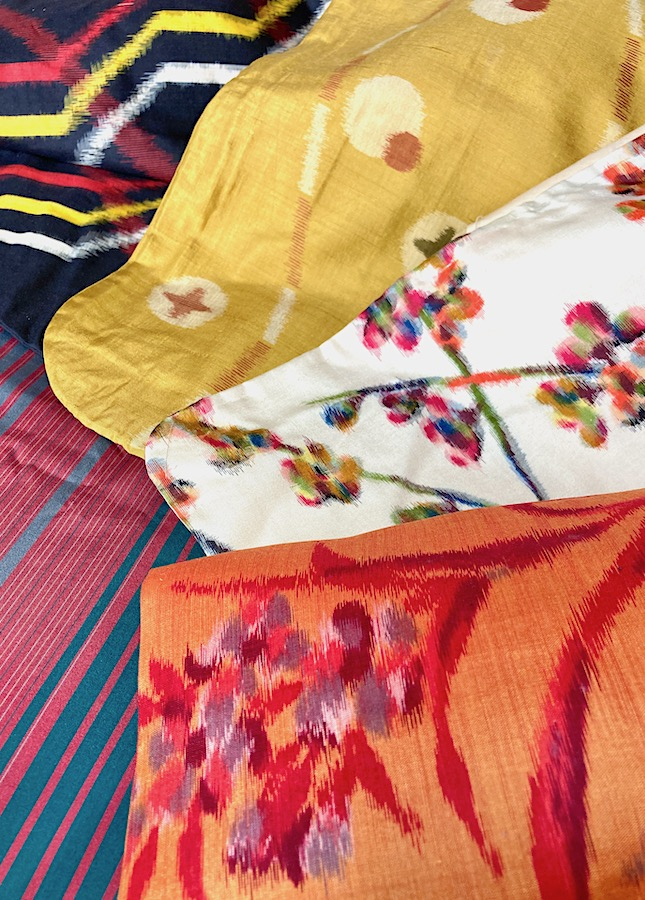
Meisen cloth, probably 1950s

Meisen (銘(めい)仙(せん), lit. 'common silk stuff') is a type of silk fabric traditionally produced in Japan; it is durable, hard-faced, and somewhat stiff, with a slight sheen, and slubbiness is deliberately emphasised. Meisen was first produced in the late 19th century, and became widely popular during the 1920s and 30s (late-Taishō to early-Shōwa period), when it was mass-produced and ready-to-wear kimono began to be sold in Japan. Meisen is commonly dyed using kasuri (Japanese ikat) techniques, and features what were then overtly modern, non-traditional designs and colours. Meisen remained popular through to the 1950s.

The fibre used for meisen is staple fibre (often silk noil), degummed and sized with soy milk, which increases durability and increases the depth and brilliance of the dye colours. Between 1910 and 1925 (late Taishō to Shōwa period), the ability to spin as well as weave noil by machine (see tsumugi) was developed into mass production. Prices dropped drastically, and silk cloth and clothing was suddenly within the budget of most Japanese (who had previously worn asa, domesticated bast fibre, or cotton; see tanmono).

== Materials, spinning and weaving ==
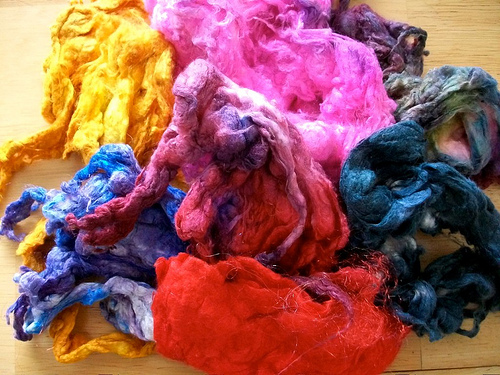
Unspun short-fiber silk noil; see sericulture

Silk naturally comes in extremely long filaments (more than a kilometre and a half long), one per silkworm cocoon. Some filaments get broken in processing, or were collected, already broken, from wild. These shorter threads are called silk noil. Traditionally, the long silk was used for high-status garments, often legally reserved for the upper classes, but the lower classes could use noil.

Traditionally, the noil was joined by hand-plying the ends or by spinning the noil into thread, as short-staple fibers are spun. Handspun noil was not twisted tightly. Cloth made from noil using Japanese hand methods is called tsumugi. Tsumugi is slubbed, rough-surfaced, soft and drapey, softening further with age.

As the textile industry in Japan industrialized in the late 19th century, large amounts of silk were produced for export. Silk noil was not exported, so there was an abundant supply. Initially, only the filament silk could be made into cloth in a mechanized manner; noil had to be handspun. Attempts were made to machine-spin and machine-weave noil, and techniques gradually improved. These new machine-made slubbed silks were called meisen.

Meisen was spun tightly, with many more twists per unit length. It is stiff and crisp, with a glossy, hard, resilient surface, and wears well.

Later, cloth made from blends of other fibers, but with similar properties or social roles, was sometimes marketed as meisen.

== Dyeing and patterning ==
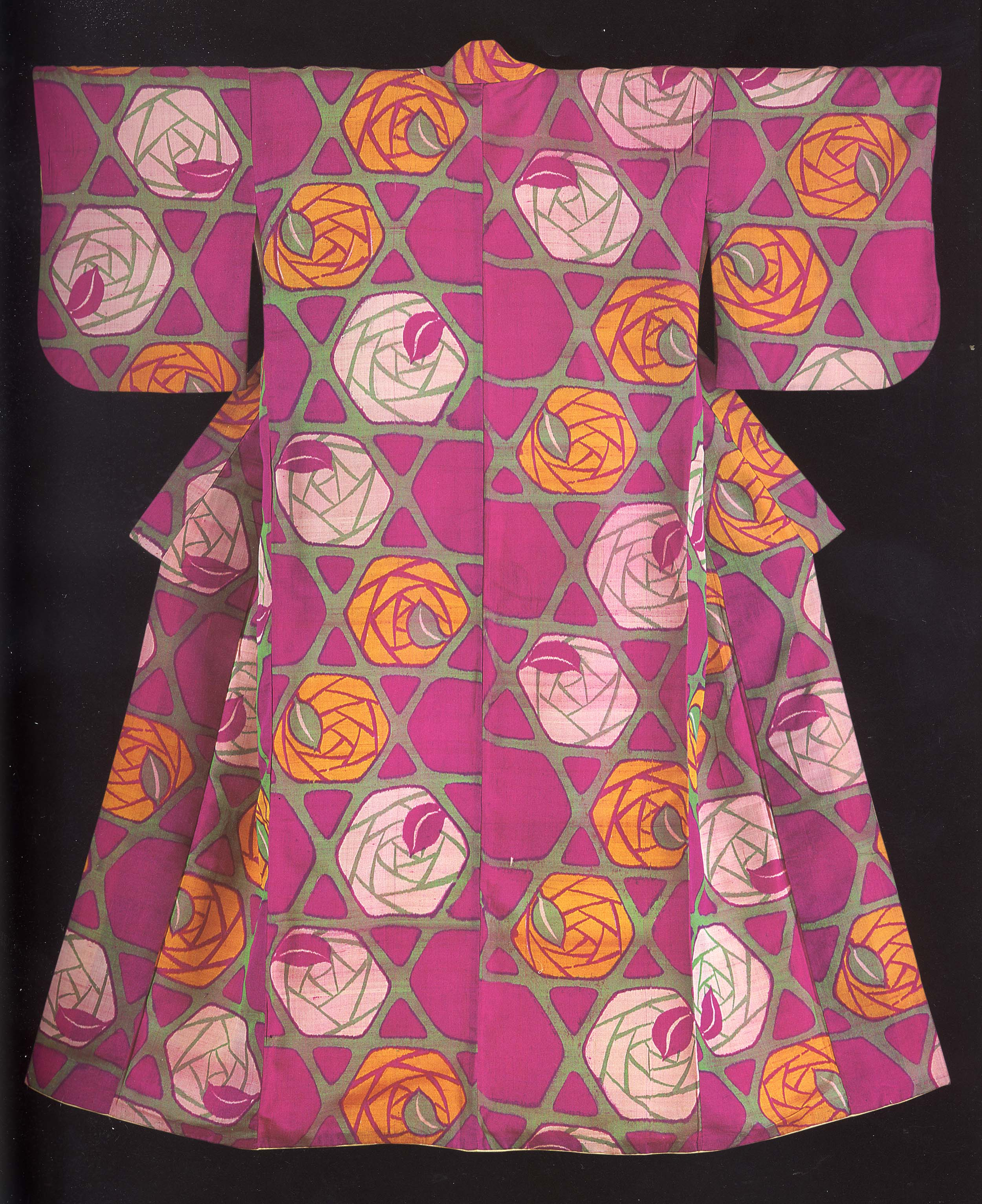
Kimono, stencil-printed warp, with a notably Arts and Crafts lattice-and-rose motif, 1912 to 1926

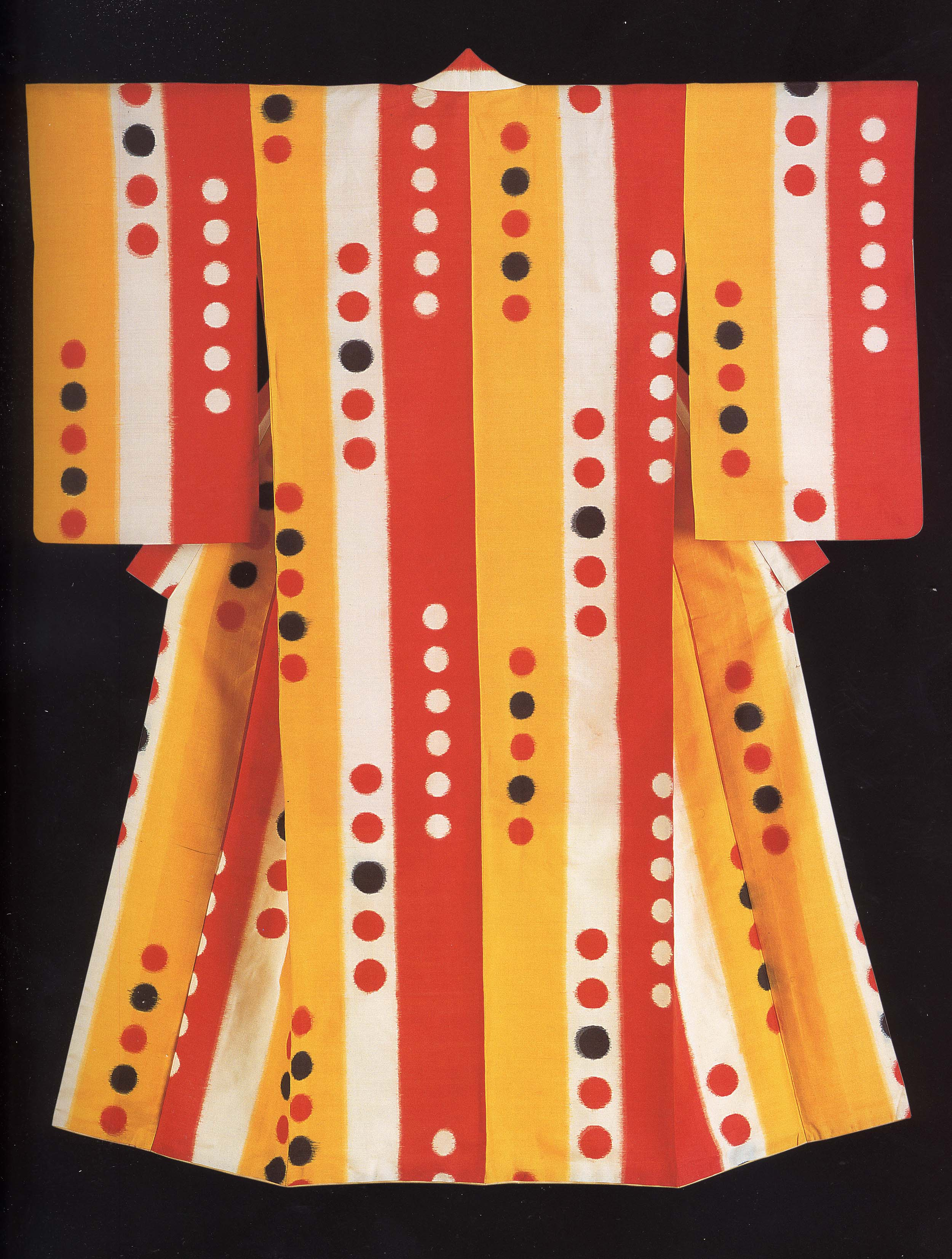
Kimono, stencil printed on warp and weft

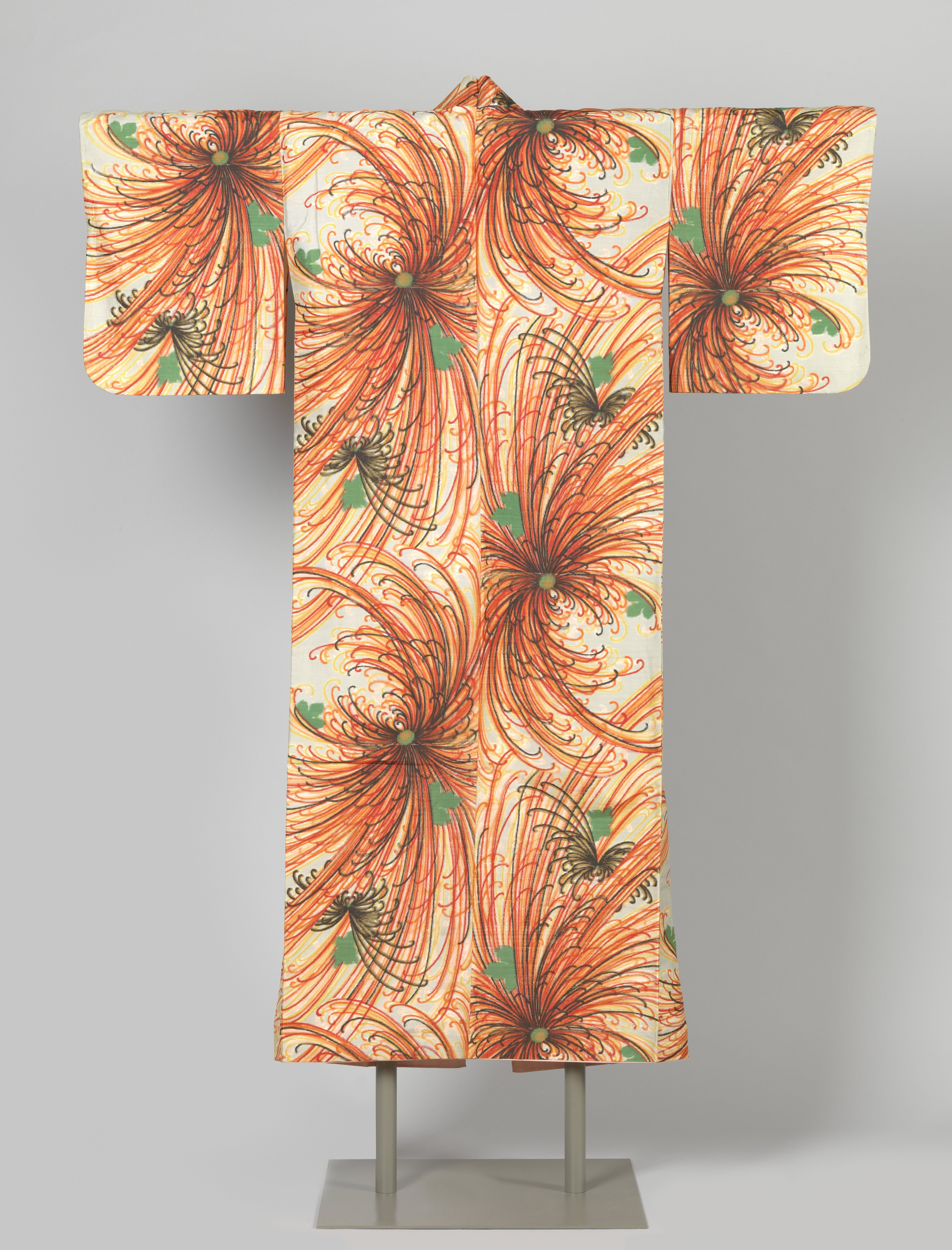
Stencil-printed meisen kimono, chrysanthemum pattern

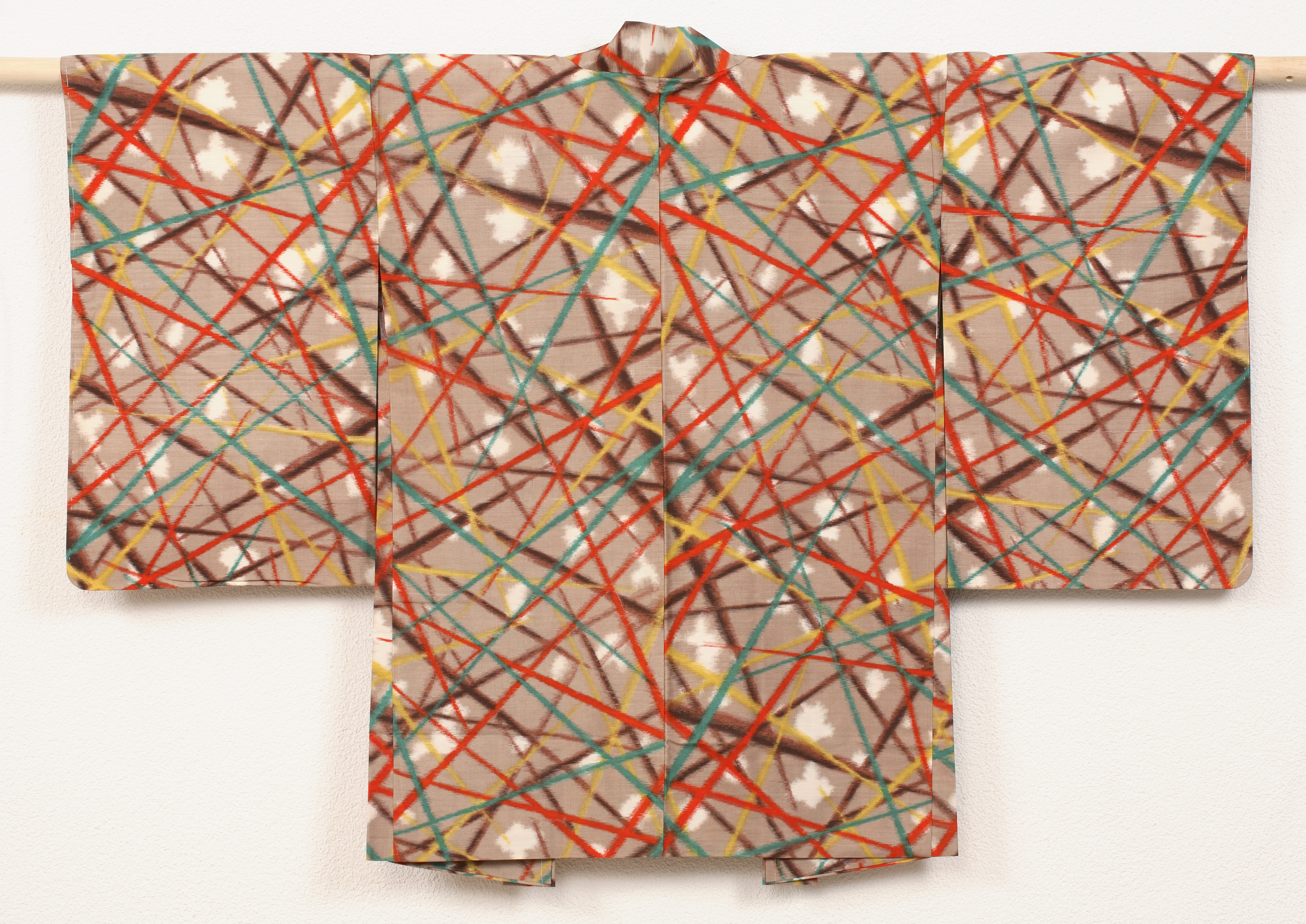
Stencil-printed haori, circa 1920-1940

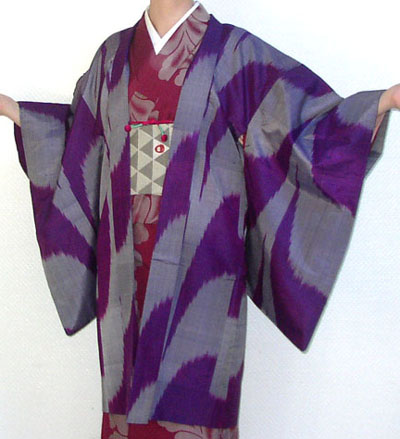
Meisen haori over a more subdued kimono.

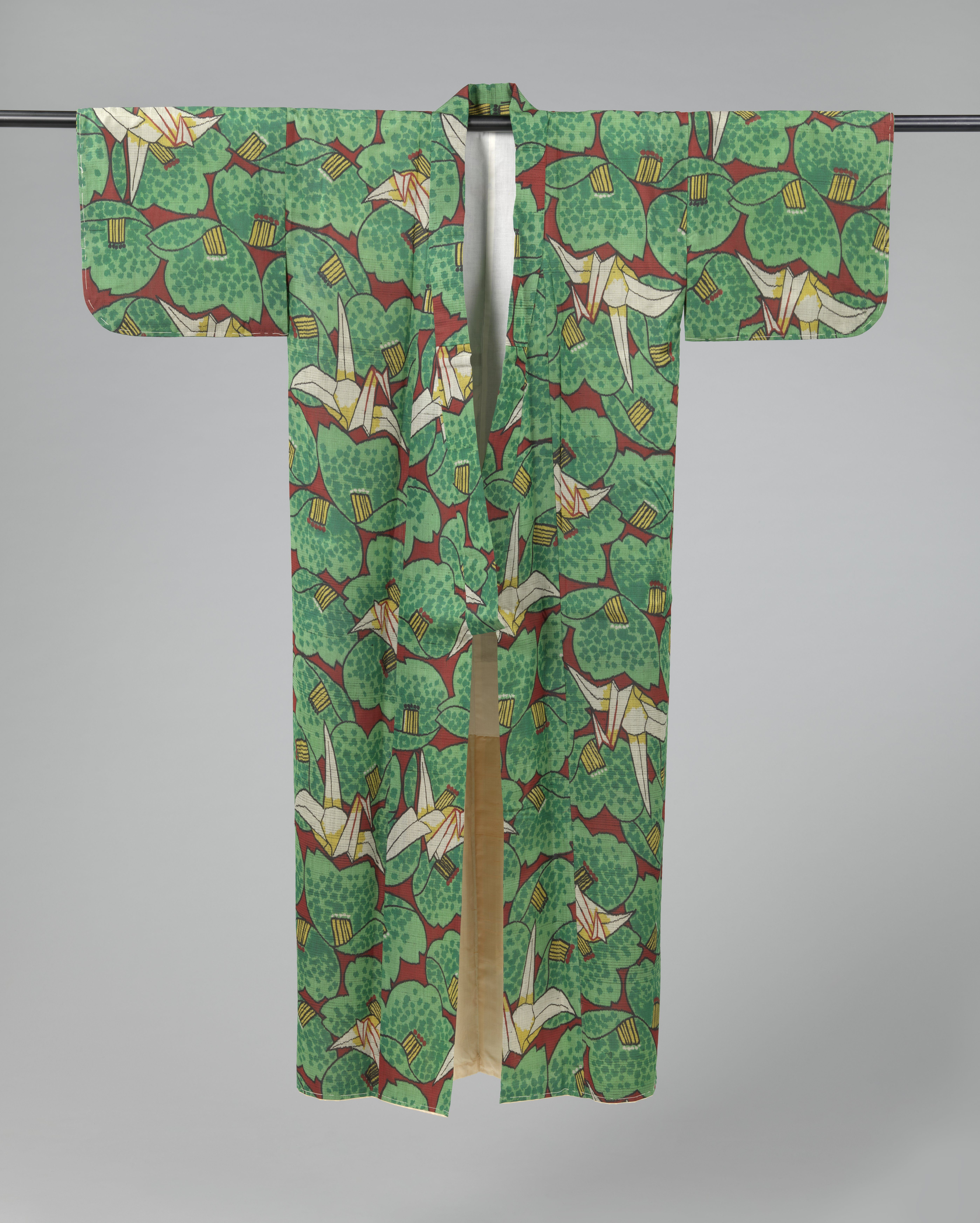
Kimono with paper cranes (origami), portrayed in Western perspective

Meisen was generally dyed with bright new aniline dyes, which were cheaper and faster to use than traditional plant-based dyes. Unlike in Meiji-period clothing, no attempt was made to match the colours of the older dyes; vivid, obviously synthetic shades were commonly used.

Initially, meisen was produced in plain colours or simple stripes. Later, it came to be dyed by kasuri (Japanese ikat).

While traditional kasuri involved tying bundles of threads and dying them by hand, meisen was often patterned using less labour-intensive techniques. These produced kasuri-style blurred edges to the patterns, but with lower labour costs than hand-tying. For instance, for warp-faced fabrics, the warp threads might be dyed (printed) on the loom, or dyed by the hogushi ("unravelling") technique: weaving the warp with a very sparse, temporary weft (called tane-ito), laying the cloth on a printing-table, stencil-printing the pattern, letting the dye dry, removing the temporary weft, and re-weaving the now-coloured warp threads with a permanent weft. Later, techniques for stencil-dyeing the weft threads were invented (yokoso-kasuri), and then techniques for dying both warp and weft (heiyo-kasuri). The dyes were mixed with rice paste or a similar starchy paste before being squeegeed over the stencils.

These thread-dying techniques produce a double-sided pattern, unlike painting or printing cloth, so when a meisen garment begins to show wear on the outside, it can be resewn with the panels flipped inside-to-out.

Patterns on meisen are often somewhat mismatched, and motifs range far beyond traditional kimono subjects. Motifs may be taken from portions of traditional patterns, and are largely abstract, often bold, geometric, or with op-art-like dazzle effects. Designs included exotic motifs like stained glass patterns, Egyptian patterns, exotic birds, and exotic flowers like roses and tulips, and were influenced by imported movies. Designs are often Western-influenced, including by the Art Nouveau, Modernist, Expressionist, Art Deco, and Arts and Crafts movements, which had in turn been influenced by Japanese art.

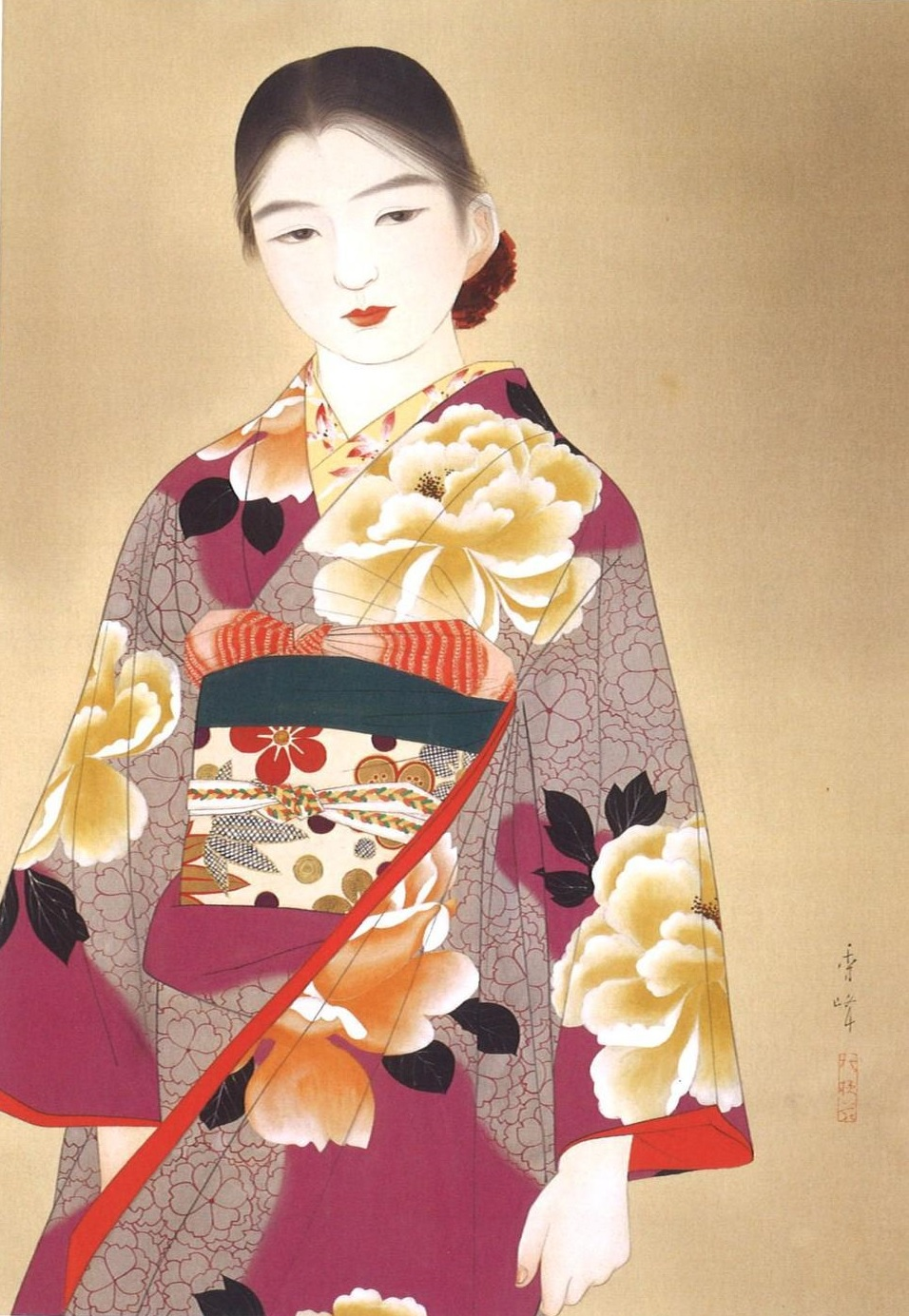
Meisen advertisement art print, 1934, commissioned by the Ashikaga Meisen Association (of textile-makers) and the Takashimaya Department Store. The large peony pattern is in a non-traditional colour combination.

== Industry ==
The market was highly competitive and had a rapid pace of technical innovation. New designs were produced each season, and advertised as defining specific "looks" and social meanings; department store requested specific patterns, made fashion forecasts, and gave marketing advice. Networks of wholesalers at various geographic scales formed.

After the military, the textile industry led Japanese industrialisation. Initially, there were government subsidies and substantial government ownership. In 1882, government had just begun to privatise major enterprises, and textile mills made up half of private factories and employed 2/3 of factory workers. Textile workers increasingly became mostly female. In the Taishō period, many workers were daughters of well-off farm families and the former ruling class, but later they came mostly from poor peasant families.

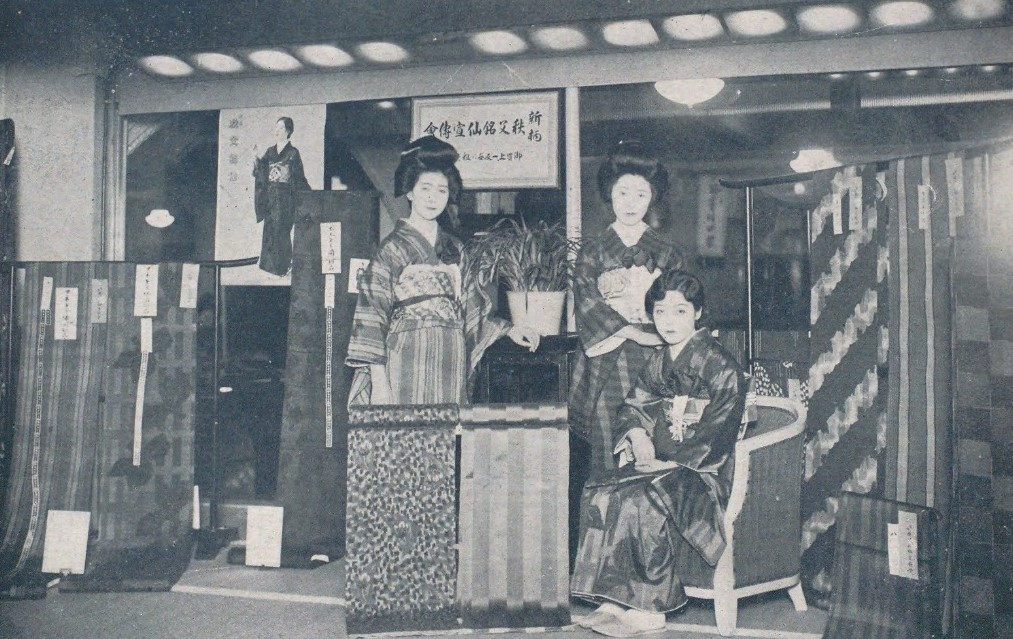
A store selling meisen, 1930

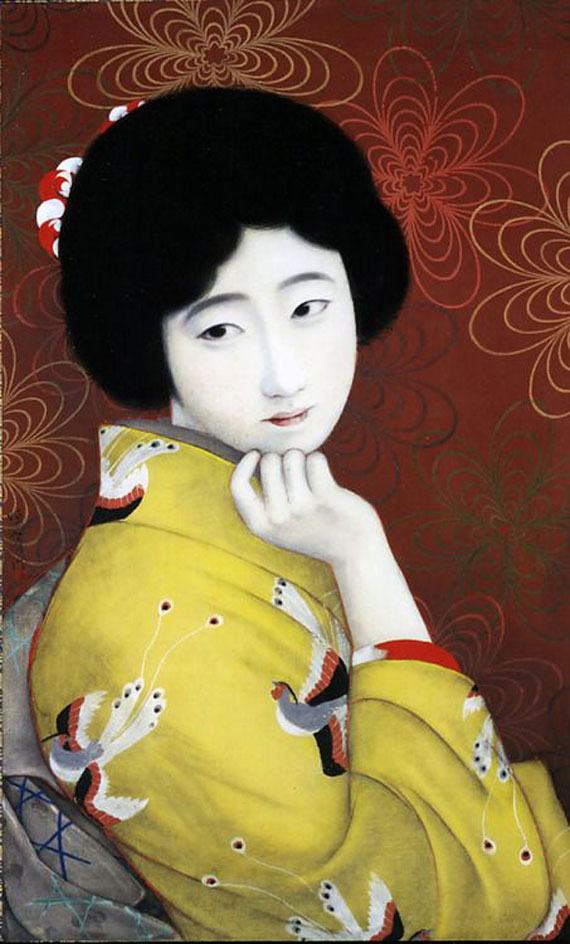
Another Ashikaga advertising poster, 1928; Art Nouveau-influenced pattern

== Use and survival ==
Meisen was a fairly cheap cloth, used for clothing, noren curtains, futons, and zabuton (cushions). In the 1870s, meisen was worn by geisha for informal gatherings.

Meisen garments were often lined with lightweight cloth, from cheaper fibres like cotton or cupro. These were usually not treated with fibre-damaging sizing, as more expensive cloth often was, improving the chances of the garments surviving.

Cheap, bright, hard-wearing meisen kimonos boomed during the economic downturn. It is estimated that, in the late 1920s, over 70% of Japanese women owned one or more.

Meisen was extremely popular in its day, especially among newly-financially-independent women, before abruptly going out of fashion. This abrupt unfashionalbleness helped preserve many meisen garments. Small amounts of meisen are still produced in the 21st century, and there are many meisen garments on the secondhand market. Boldly-patterned meisen is periodically popular with wafuku enthusiasts.

== See also ==
- Tanmono, the traditional bolt of cloth used for making kimono
- Kasuri, traditional Japanese ikat dyework
- Tsumugi, a rougher, softer, less-uniform slubby noil cloth.
