= Satin =

Shiny, fragile fabric weave pattern, with long floats

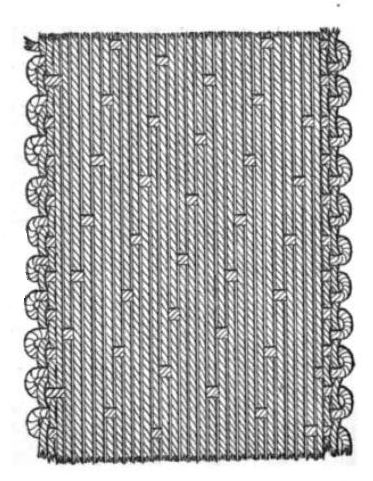
Satin weave. The warp yarns are shown running top to bottom, weft running sideways folding at each side. In this case, each warp thread floats over 15 weft threads, then passes under one weft thread, then floats for 15 more threads.

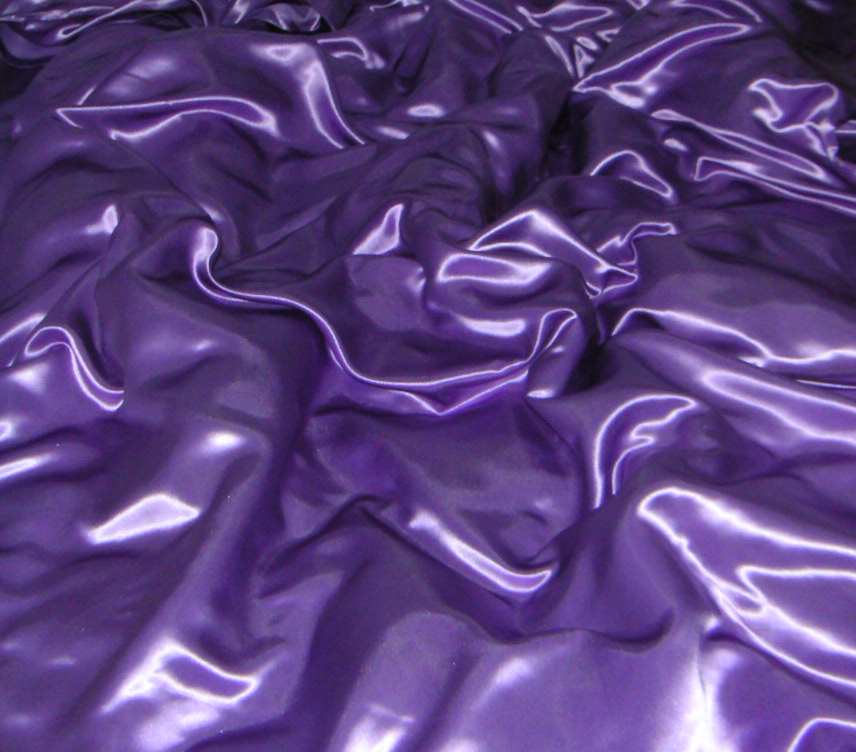
Purple satin fabric

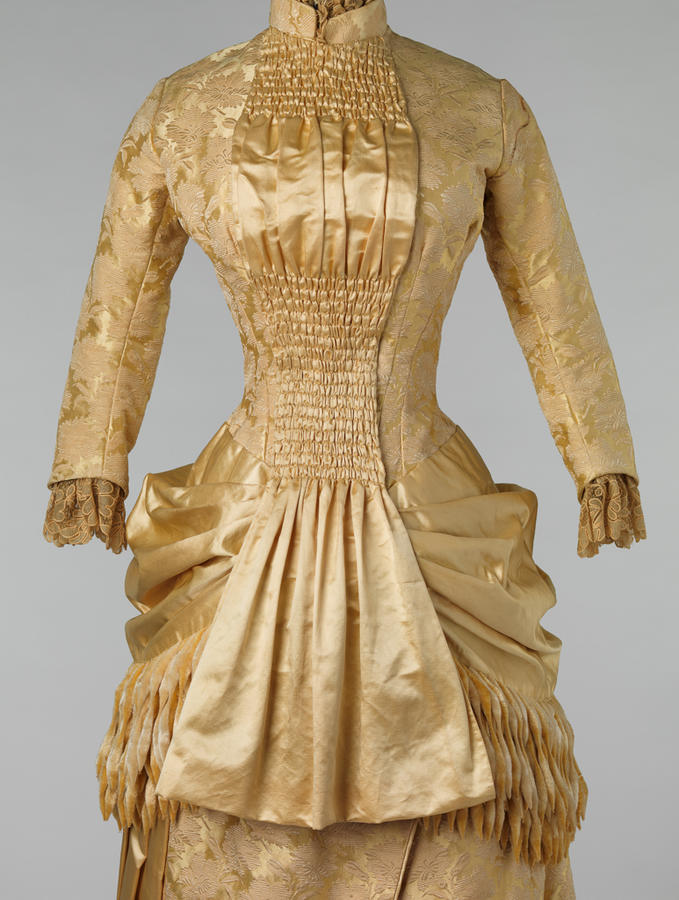
A dress made from satin.

A satin weave is a type of fabric weave that produces a characteristically glossy, smooth or lustrous material, typically with a glossy top surface and a dull back; it is not durable, as it tends to snag. It is one of three fundamental types of textile weaves alongside plain weave and twill weave.

The satin weave is characterised by four or more fill or weft yarns floating over a warp yarn, and four warp yarns floating over a single weft yarn. Floats are missed interfacings, for example where the warp yarn lies on top of the weft in a warp-faced satin. These floats explain the high lustre and even sheen, as unlike in other weaves, light is not scattered as much when hitting the fibres, resulting in a stronger reflection. Satin is usually a warp-faced weaving technique in which warp yarns are "floated" over weft yarns, although there are also weft-faced satins. If a fabric is formed with a satin weave using filament fibres such as silk, polyester or nylon, the corresponding fabric is termed a 'satin', although some definitions insist that a satin fabric is only made from silk. If the yarns used are short-staple yarns such as cotton, the fabric formed is considered a sateen.

Many variations can be made of the basic satin weave, including a granite weave and a check weave.

Satin is commonly used in clothing, for items such as lingerie, nightgowns, blouses, and evening gowns, but is also used for boxer shorts, shirts and neckties. It is also used in the production of pointe shoes for ballet. Other uses include interior furnishing fabrics, upholstery, and bedding.

== History ==
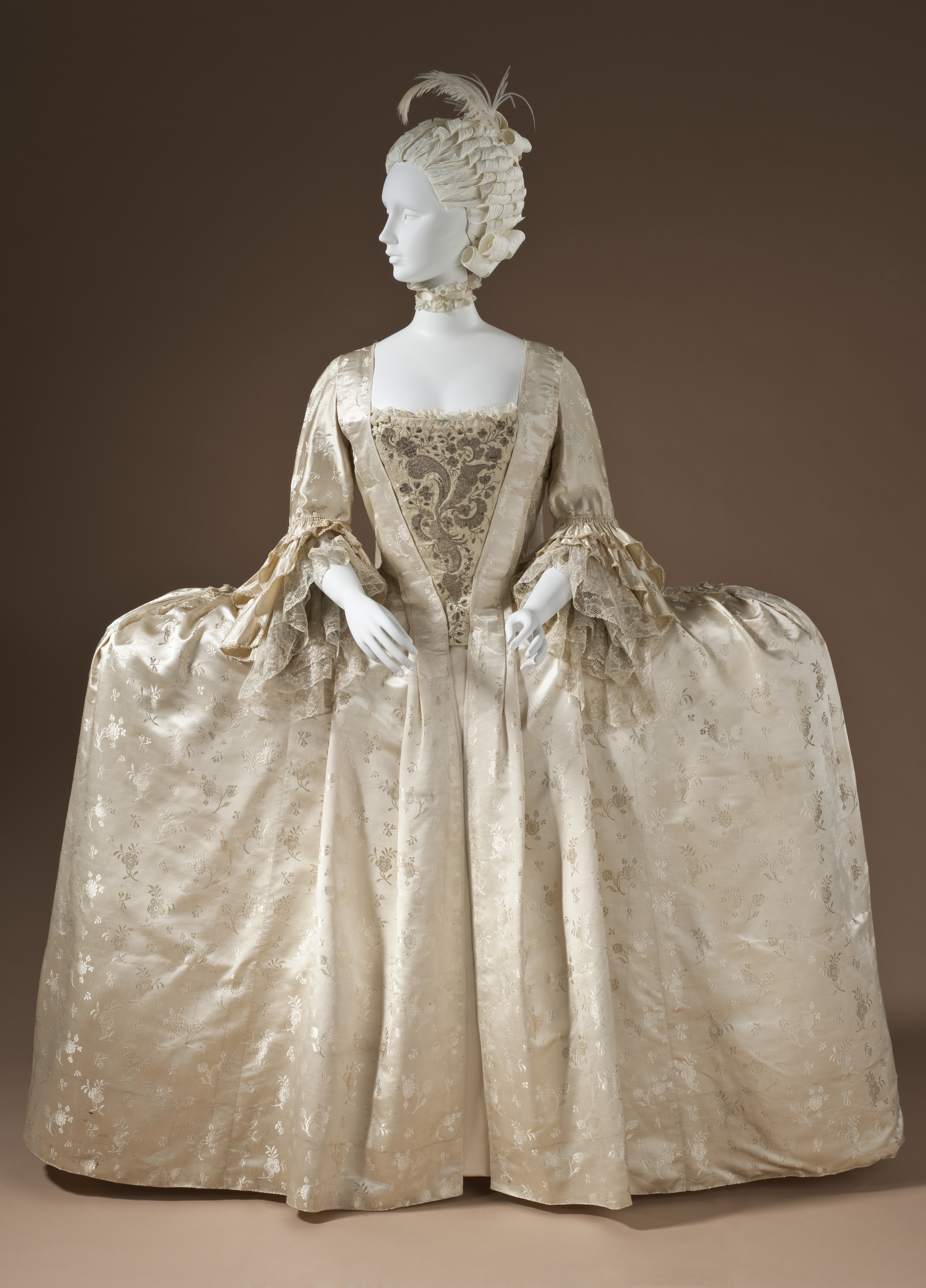
Satin robe. English, c. 1765

=== Origin ===
Satin originated in ancient China and was originally made solely of silk. Various forms of satin fabrics existed, which came under several names, such as duan (缎), zhusi (紵丝), ling (绫), jin (锦), wusi (五丝) and basi (八丝). Chinese satin, in its original form, was supposed to be a five- or six-end warp satin. The six-end warp satin weave was mostly likely a derivative of the six-end warp twill weave during the Tang and Northern Song dynasty periods.

== Etymology ==
The word "satin" derives its origin from the Chinese port city of Quanzhou (泉州), which was known as Zayton in Europe during the Yuan dynasty (13th–14th century), and Arab merchants referred to the silk material imported from that city as zaituni. During that period, Quanzhou was visited by Arab merchants and by Europeans. The Arabs referred to silk satin imported from Quanzhou as zaituni. During the latter part of the Middle Ages, Quanzhou was a major shipping port of silk, using the Maritime Silk Road to reach Europe. It was mostly used in the Arab world.

== Types of satin weave ==
Satin-weave fabrics are more flexible, with better draping characteristics than plain weaves. In a satin weave, the fill yarn passes over multiple warp yarns before interlacing under one warp yarn. Common satin weaves are:

- 4-harness satin weave (4HS), also called crowfoot satin, in which the fill yarn passes over three warp yarns and under one warp yarn. It is more pliable than a plain weave.
- 5-harness satin weave (5HS); the fill yarn passes over four warp yarns and then under one warp yarn.
- 8-harness satin weave (8HS), in which the fill yarn passes over seven warp yarns and then under one warp yarn, is the most pliable satin weave.

== Types of satin ==
- Antique satin is a type of satin-back shantung, woven with slubbed or unevenly spun weft yarns.
- Baronet or baronette has a cotton back and a rayon or silk front, similar to georgette.
- Charmeuse is a lightweight, draping satin-weave fabric with a dull reverse.
- Cuttanee is a fine heavy and stout silk and cotton satin.
- Double face(d) satin is woven with a glossy surface on both sides. It is possible for both sides to have a different pattern, albeit using the same colours.
- Duchesse satin is a particularly luxurious, heavy, stiff satin.
- Faconne is jacquard woven satin.
- Farmer's satin or Venetian cloth is made from mercerised cotton.
- Gattar is satin made with a silk warp and a cotton weft.
- Messaline is lightweight and loosely woven.
- Polysatin or poly-satin is an abbreviated term for polyester satin.
- Slipper satin is woven from stiff and medium- to heavy-weight fabric.
- Sultan is a worsted fabric with a satin face.
- Surf satin was a 1910s American trademark for a taffeta fabric used for swimsuits.

== Uses for satin ==
Because of the different ways the weave is employed, satin has a range of functions from interior décor to fashion.

- Dresses: Satin's drape and shiny texture make it a favorite for evening gowns and bridal gowns.
- Upholstery: Satin was first used for ornamental furniture in Europe at the Palace of Versailles, and it is still used for pillow covers, chairs, and other forms of cushioned furniture today.
- Bed sheets: Satin is frequently used for bed linens because of its flexible and silky texture.
- Footwear: Satin is a popular fabric for shoe makers, from ballerina slippers to high heels.
- Fashion accessories: Satin is commonly used for evening bags and clutches in the fashion industry.
- Crafting: Satin in the form of ribbons is very common for crafting various products such as rosette leis, corsage, and even decorative flowers.

== Bibliography ==
- Shaeffer, Claire (2003). Sew Any Fabric. Iola, WI: Krause Publications. ISBN 9781440222627.
- Shaeffer, Claire (2008). Claire Shaeffer's Fabric Sewing Guide. Cincinnati, Ohio: Krause Publications. ISBN 978-1440223426.
