= Bokashi =

Bokashi (ぼかし) is Japanese for "shading off" or "gradation." It may refer to:

- Bokashi (printing), a printing technique
- Bokashi gasuri, a dyeing technique for textiles
- Fogging (censorship), blurring an image as a form of censorship
- Bokashi (horticulture), an organic waste fermentation-process like silage
- Bokeh, an image effect related to Bokashi.
