= Charmeuse =

Lightweight woven fabric with a satin face and dull back

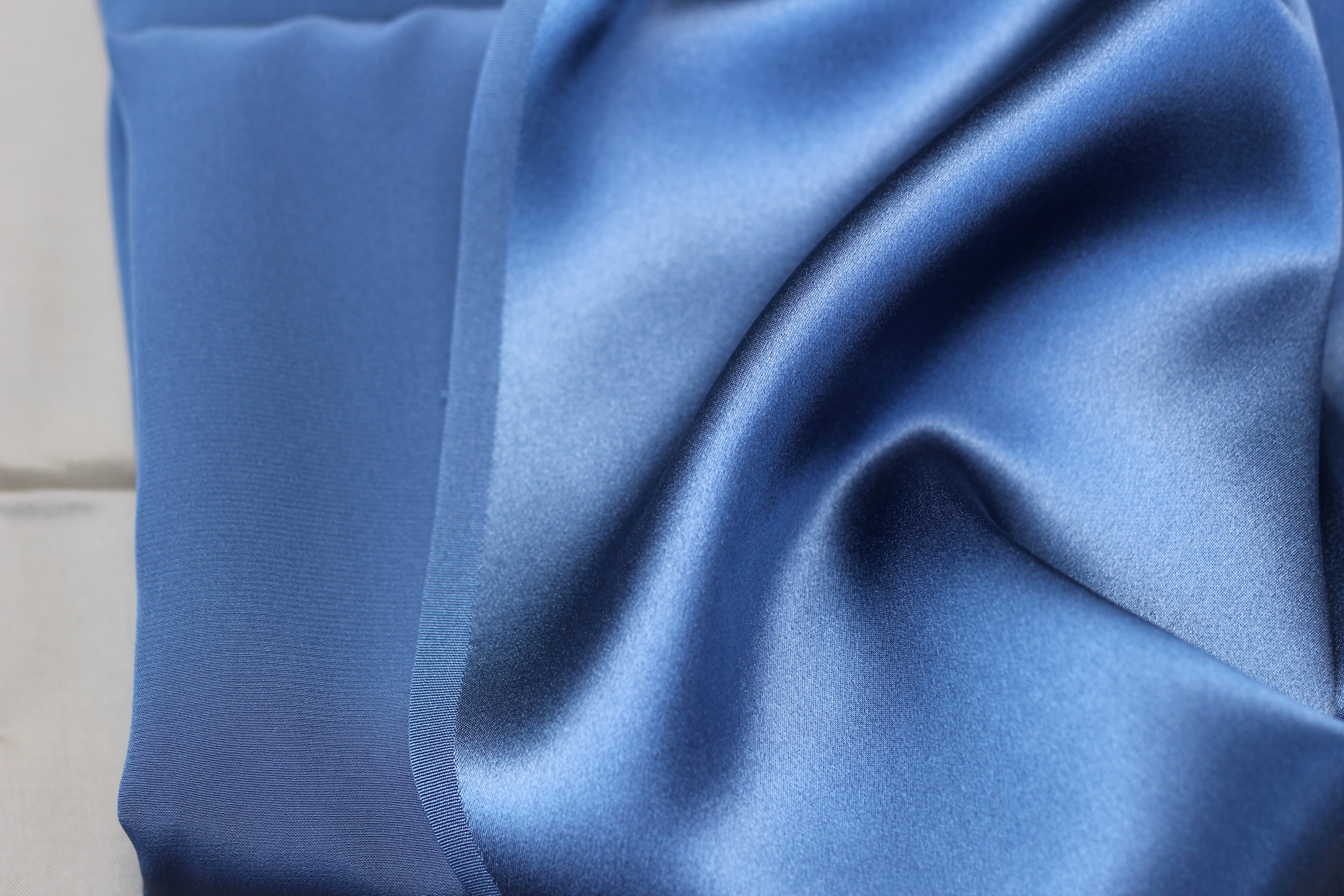
A piece of silk charmeuse fabric showing the shiny, satin front and dull, matte back

Charmeuse (/ʃɑːrˈmuːz, -ˈmuːs/; French: [ʃaʁmøz]; French for 'female charmer') is a lightweight fabric woven with a satin weave. These float threads give the front of the fabric a smooth, shiny finish, whereas the back has a dull finish. Charmeuse differs from plain satin in that charmeuse has a different ratio of float (face) threads, and is of a lighter weight. Charmeuse may be made of silk, polyester, or rayon. Charmeuse woven from blended fibers has also become more common. It is used in women's clothing such as lingerie, evening gowns, and blouses, especially garments with a bias cut. It is occasionally used in menswear.

== Characteristics ==
Charmeuse is lightweight and drapes easily. It has a satin side, which is shiny, and a matte side, which is dull.

It can be made of silk or a synthetic lookalike such as polyester. Silk charmeuse is more expensive and delicate but is softer and a better insulator.

Polyester charmeuse has characteristics that are undesirable for sewing, including a tendency to pucker at the seams and fraying during cutting and handling. Polyester charmeuse is cheaper and can often withstand machine washing. It can be a challenging fabric to sew; it tends to be slippery and may be difficult to control through the presser foot of a sewing machine. Pins can make holes and marks in polyester charmeuse, so sharp dressmaker's pins, with a smooth taper to the point, are used when sewing charmeuse garments. A sizing product may be sprayed on charmeuse before cutting.

== History ==
A rudimentary charmeuse was first found to be made in China, dating back to 3630 BCE. It was originally made of silk and reserved for the upper class, but charmeuse eventually made its way to Europe and remained popular through the Middle Ages and the Renaissance period. The modern fabric that is associated with the name charmeuse, however, was further developed in France by tailors and dressmakers.

== Uses ==
The luster and delicate hand make charmeuse suited to lingerie, flowing evening gowns, and draped blouses. Bridal gowns sometimes use charmeuse. Because the fabric does not hold a shape well and tends to cling and hang against the body, it is not used for full, flared skirts. It is best suited to a more fluid, slinky bias cut.

Its uses in menswear include the lining of jackets and slacks, handkerchiefs, ties, and underwear, such as charmeuse boxer shorts.

The look of charmeuse is prized for dressy garments, especially when cut on the bias, a technique used to create garments that flow well on the body.

Charmeuse is also the required material for the outer layer of Olympic competition ski jumper suits.
