= Kumejima-tsumugi =

Silk cloth from Okinawa Prefecture, Japan

Kumejima-tsumugi (久米島紬; Okinawan: Kumijima chimuji) is the Ryukyuan craft of silk cloth practiced in Kumejima, Okinawa Prefecture. Kumejima-tsumugi is the oldest type of tsumugi in Japan, out of the approximately two hundred forms of tsumugi, and is the oldest kasuri fabric. It is recognised as one of the Important Intangible Cultural Properties of Japan.

== History ==
Silk production has been practiced in Kumejima since the 15th century, after a local, having studied sericulture in Ming Dynasty China, transmitted the techniques. Mulberry plants, the primary foodstuff of silkworms, is said to grow particularly well on the island.

By the 17th century, kumejima-tsumugi formed part of the tribute paid to the Ryūkyū Kings, and it was transported to Edo via the Satsuma Domain.

== Production ==
Silk floss is extracted from silkworm cocoons and spun by hand into yarn. It is then dyed with the kasuri technique, using indigenous plant dyes and a mud mordant to give it its characteristic black-brown colouring; the plants used are the guru, techika, kurubo or Japanese persimmon, yamamomo and yuna, or cotton tree hibiscus. Finally it is woven with a takahata (高機) loom, and fulled by block.

== Intangible Cultural Property ==
In 2004, the Kumejima Kasuri Technique Preservation Society (久米島紬保持団体) was founded, and kumejima-tsumugi was designated one of the Important Intangible Cultural Properties of Japan.

== See also ==
- Important Intangible Cultural Properties of Japan
- National Treasures of Japan - Dyeing and weaving
- Representative List of the Intangible Cultural Heritage of Humanity
- Sericulture
- Kasuri
- Yūki-tsumugi, another form of tsumugi produced in Yūki
- List of Traditional Crafts of Japan
