= Slub (textiles) =

Thicker section of yarn, thread or fiber

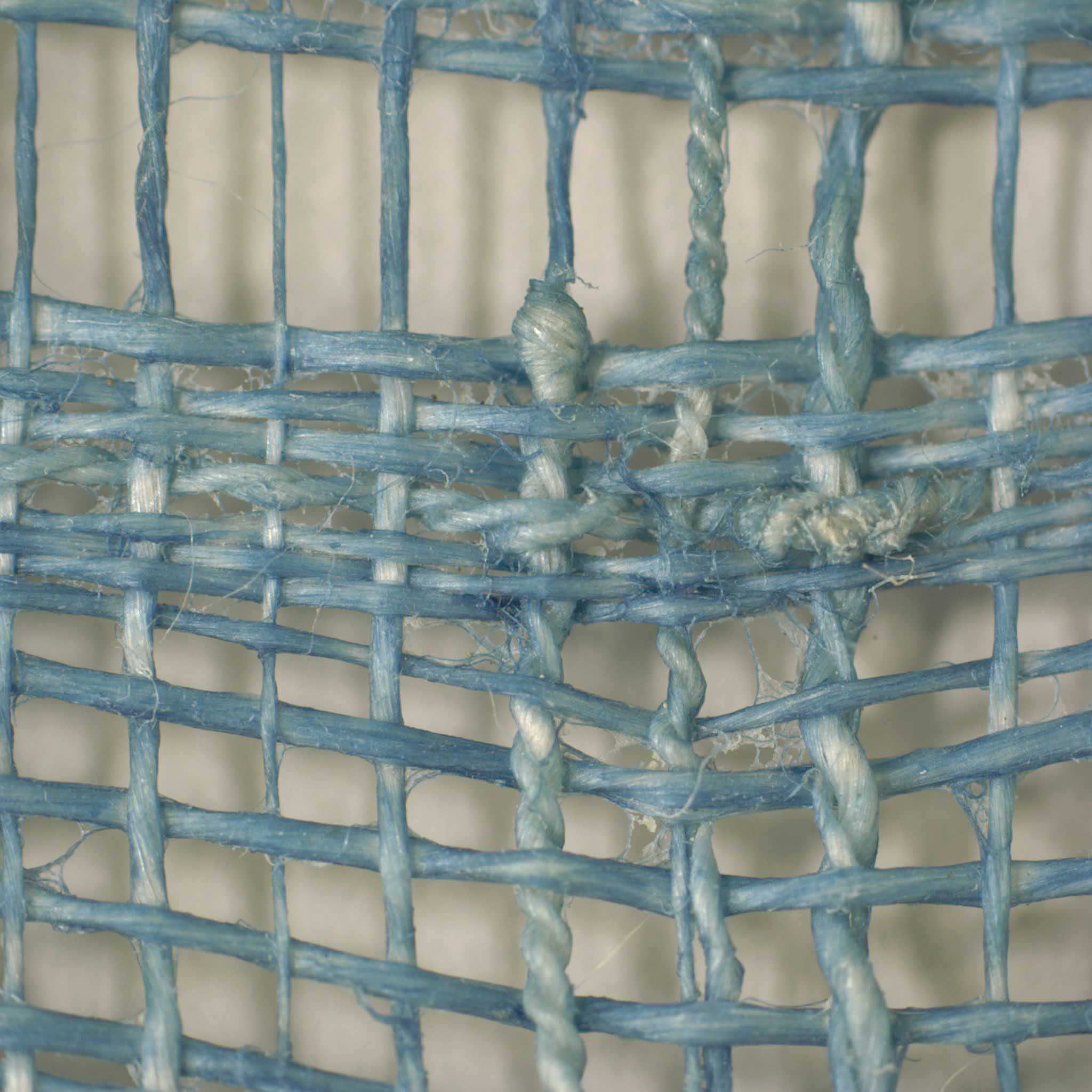
Open-weave cloth showing extremely slubby warp and weft threads

A slub in textile production is a thickened section of a fiber or yarn. Slubbed or slubby fabric is woven from slubby yarn (yarn with a very variable diameter). Both high and low slubbiness may be sought.

Slubs in spun fibers may be produced deliberately by varying spinning tension (see Novelty yarns#Slub). They are also produced when short staple fibers are spun into a single yarn. Slubs may be valued or deliberately produced for aesthetic effect, but they may also be regarded as a defect caused by either uneven spinning or using low-grade, lumpy or short-staple fiber.

== Types ==
Slubby cotton fabric includes:

- Madras (cloth), woven from short-staple cotton
- Some denim used for jeans; the slubs cause the cloth to fade unevenly, in a pattern called tate-ochi

Linen is often slubbed. Wool fabrics, such as tweeds, may also be slubbed.

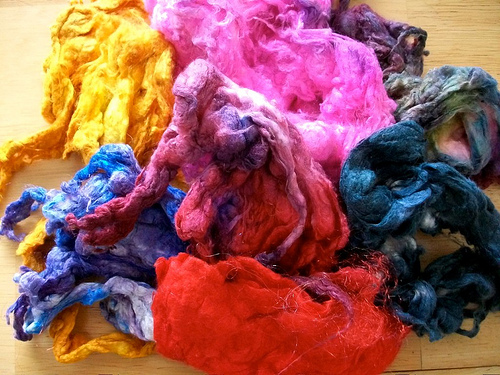
Unspun short-fiber silk noil; see sericulture

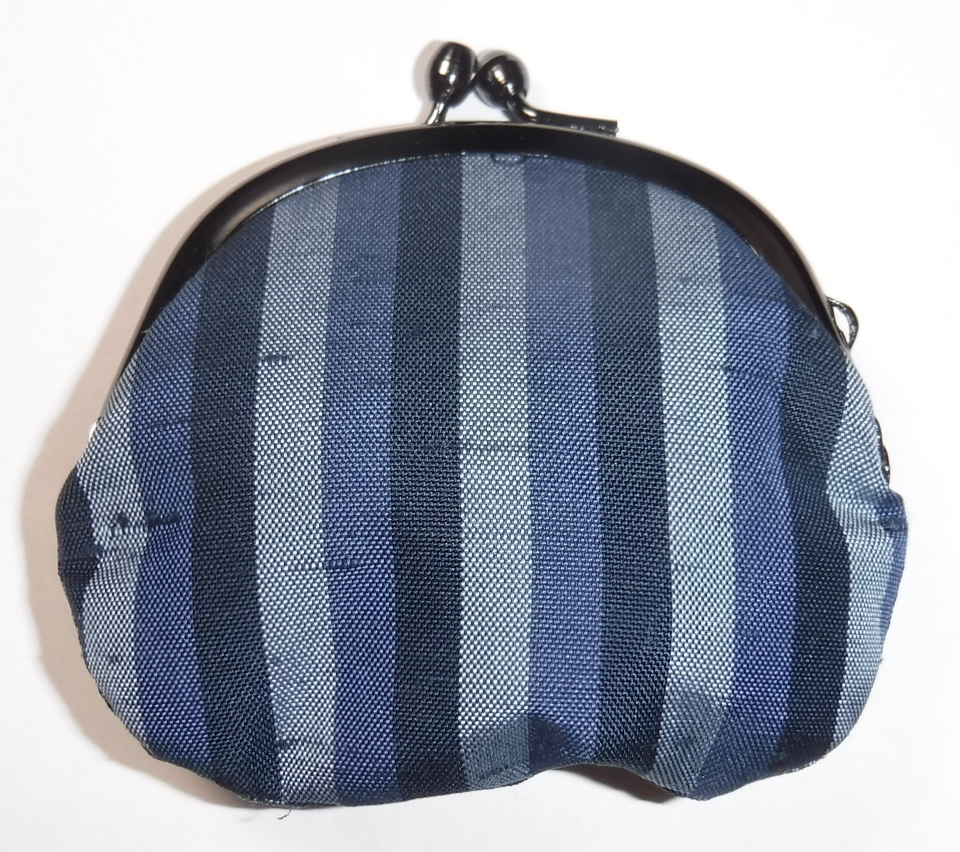
Tsumugi cloth, showing slubs

Silk is a filament fiber, and the only natural fiber type to come in filament length naturally (strands can be over 1.5 km long). However, some silk fibers are shorter in length, and must therefore be processed as shorter-staple fibers, not as filament fibers, to make cloth. These shorter fibers, known as silk noil, may also be used unspun (for instance, as wadding in a quilted garment), but are often plied into threads and used in the production of slubbed silks. Slubbed silks include:

- Shantung (fabric)
- Dupioni
- Tsumugi
- Meisen
- Thai silk
- Some tussah silk
- Eri silk

Slubby mixed-fiber fabrics include:

- Bourette
- "Antique" satin

Synthetic fibers can readily be produced in filament form, as very long lengths of consistent diameter, but it is sometimes slubbed for effect.
