= Yūki-tsumugi =

Variety of Japanese silk cloth produced in Ibaraki Prefecture

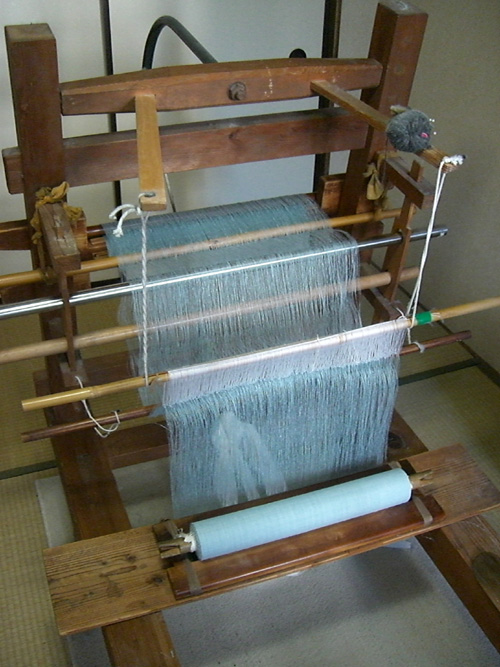
- Yūki-tsumugi weaving
- Type: Fabric
- Material: Silk
- Production method: Weaving
- Production process: Craft production
- Place of origin: Yūki, Japan

Yuki-tsumugi, silk fabric production technique
- UNESCO Intangible Cultural Heritage
- Country: Japan
- Reference: 00406
- Region: Asia and the Pacific

Inscription history
- Inscription: 2010 (5th session)
- List: Representative

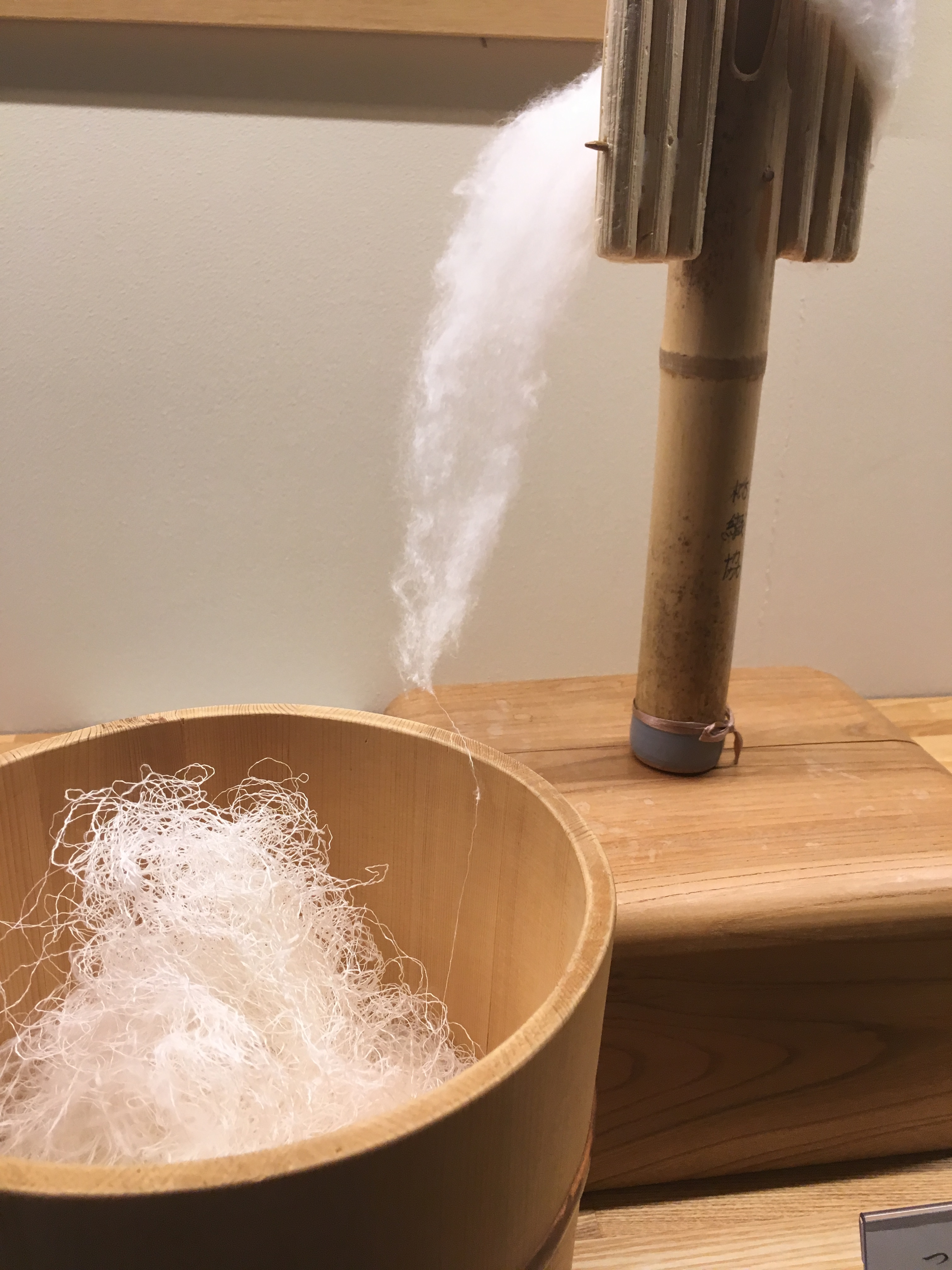
Handspinning

Yūki-tsumugi (結城紬) is a variety of silk cloth produced in Japan, chiefly in Yūki in Ibaraki Prefecture. It is designated as one of the Important Intangible Cultural Properties of Japan, and has also been inscribed on the UNESCO Representative List of the Intangible Cultural Heritage of Humanity.

== History ==
The traditional history of yūki-tsumugi traces its origin to a crafthouse known as Nagahatabeno Ashiginu during the reign of the legendary Emperor Sujin. Knowledge of the method of silk production, developed by its founder, Ooyanomikoto, was said to have immediately spread out to the Yūki district and beyond.

Another account identified the Muromachi period (14th–16th century) as the period when yūki-tsumugi was developed. It is said that the feudal lord of a farmer family in the Hitachi Province sent tsumugi fabric to a governor called Kamakura Kanryo every year as a gift.

Developing from earlier silk techniques, the name "yūki-tsumugi" was adopted in 1602. Weavers were invited from Ueda Castle and the cloth, at first plain, was used as a gift for the shōgun.

In 1873, yūki-tsumugi was exhibited at the 1873 Vienna World's Fair, and became known worldwide. Currently, approximately one hundred and thirty craftsmen practice the craft of yūki-tsumugi production in Yūki and Oyama.

== Production method ==
To produce the fabric, silk floss is first extracted from silkworm cocoons and is spun by hand into yarn. Dyed patterns are added to the cloth with kasuri ikat before weaving with a loom known as a jibata (地機). The technique involves a tedious process of manually tying thousands of resists before the yarn is dyed, based on the desired resulting pattern or design. The strap around the weaver's waist enables the tension of the vertical thread to be adjusted. It can take up to fifteen days to weave enough plain fabric for an adult garment, and up to forty-five days for patterned fabric.

== Cultural Heritage ==
In 1956, yūki-tsumugi was designated one of the Important Intangible Cultural Properties of Japan. The Association for the Preservation of the Honba Yūki-tsumugi Weaving Technique (本場結城紬技術保持会) was established in 1976 and helps promote and transmit the craft. Yūki Daiichi High School in Yūki has a yūki-tsumugi club. In 2010, UNESCO inscribed yūki-tsumugi on its Representative List of the Intangible Cultural Heritage of Humanity.

== See also ==
- Sericulture
- Kasuri
- Kumejima-tsumugi
- Important Intangible Cultural Properties of Japan
- National Treasures of Japan – Dyeing and Weaving
- Representative List of the Intangible Cultural Heritage of Humanity
- List of Traditional Crafts of Japan
