= Dupioni =

Plain-weave, crisp type of silk fabric

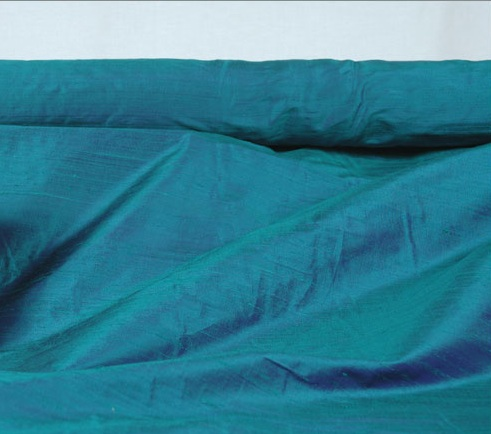
Dupioni fabric.

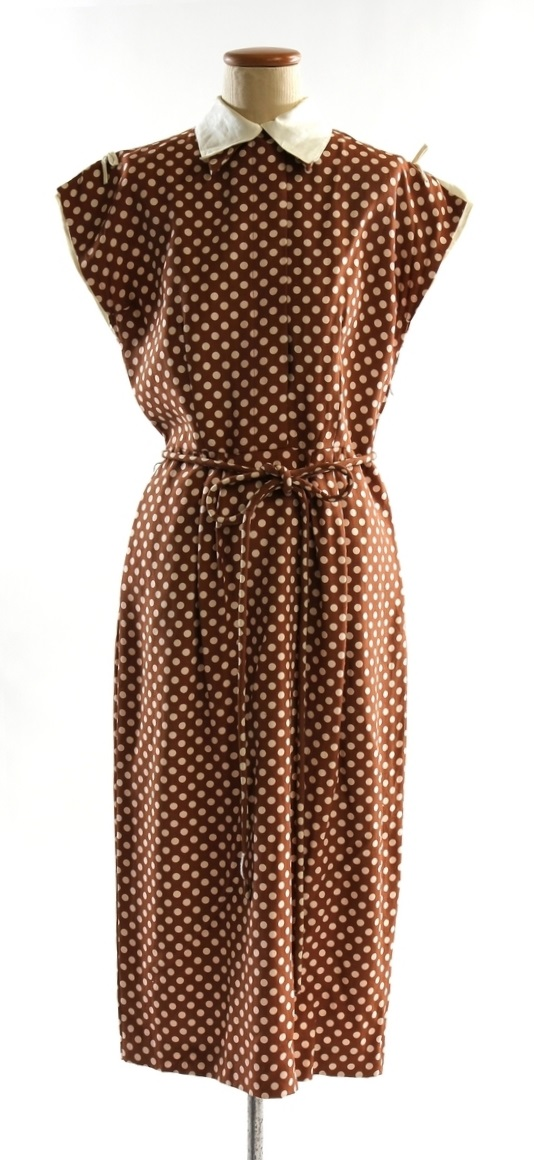
Dress in brown dupioni, 1940s/early 1950s Sweden.

Dupioni (also referred to as douppioni, doupioni or dupion) is a plain weave silk fabric, produced using fine yarn in the warp and uneven yarn reeled from two or more entangled cocoons in the weft. This creates tightly woven yardage with a highly-lustrous surface and a crisp hand. It is similar to shantung, but slightly thicker, heavier, and with a greater slub (cross-sectional irregularity) count. In Japan a cocoon containing more than one silkworm is called tamamayu.

Dupioni is often woven with differing colors of threads scattered through the warp and weft. This technique gives the fabric an iridescent effect, similar to but not as pronounced as shot silk taffeta. Dupioni can be woven into plaid and striped patterns; floral or other intrinsic, intricate designs are better suited for lighter-weight silks and/or those with smoother finishes, although dupioni may be embroidered in any manner desired.

Along with shantung, dupioni is popular in bridal and other formal wear. It is suitable for upholstery, but if it is crafted into a curtain or drape, a substantial UV-stable underlining must be used to protect the fabric from sunlight.

In India, Varanasi, also known as Banaras, is one of the major manufacturers of dupioni. Weavers of nearby villages, mainly of the Ansari community, have been producing fabrics for generations. The major demands of the Indian wedding industry are met by this city.

== See also ==
- Slubbed silk
