= Kasuri =

Japanese textile technique

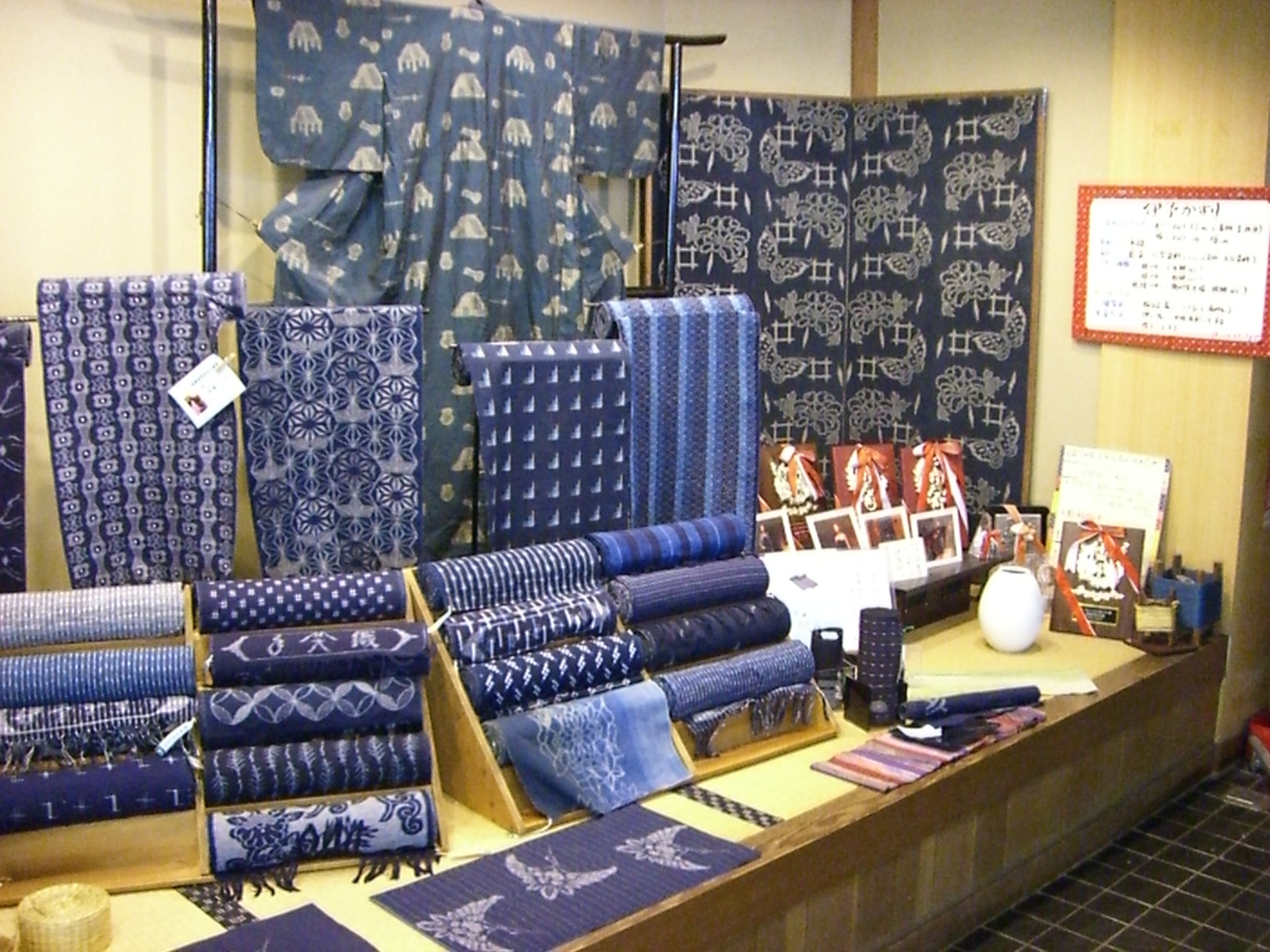
Iyo-kasuri fabric, along with kurume- and bingo-kasuri, the three main varieties of kasuri in Japan

Kasuri (絣) is the Japanese term for fabric that has been woven with fibers dyed specifically to create patterns and images in the fabric, typically referring to fabrics produced within Japan using this technique. It is a form of ikat dyeing, traditionally resulting in patterns characterized by their blurred or brushed appearance.

The warp and weft threads are resist-dyed in specific patterns prior to weaving, with sections of the warp and weft yarns tightly wrapped with thread to protect them from the dye. When woven together, the undyed areas interlace to form patterns, with many variations – including highly pictographic and multi-colored results – possible to achieve. Kasuri patterns may be applied to either the warp or the weft, or to both in order to create a resulting woven pattern, with the cloth classified using different names depending on the method used.

== Etymology ==
Though commonly confused, the terms kasuri (絣) and meisen (銘仙) are not interchangeable. While kasuri refers to a dyeing technique, meisen, literally translating as "common silk stuff", refers to a type of fabric woven from thread spun from noil. Meisen is a hard-faced, hard-wearing, stiff silk fabric with a slight sheen. The confusion stems from the fact that meisen fabrics are very commonly, though not always, dyed using the kasuri technique.

== History ==
Ikat techniques were practiced in the Ryukyu Kingdom (modern-day Okinawa) in the 12th or 13th century, and kasuri textiles were produced for export in the 14th century. After the invasion of the Ryukyu Kingdom in 1609, kasuri techniques entered southern Japan and had moved northwards to the Nara area of Honshu by 1750. A general increase in cotton production allowed farmers to weave and dye cotton textiles for their own use and for sale.

As kasuri production continued to spread throughout the country, some rural villages became manufacturing centers. Individual families tied the skeins and wove the cloth, but the dyeing was usually done in community-maintained dyeworks. By 1850, kasuri was being produced in several areas, including the Kurume area of Kyushu, the Iyo area of Shikoku and both the Bingo and San-in regions of Honshu. Some sources claim that kasuri was invented by a young girl, Den Inoue (1788–1869).

Increases in production continued until the 1930s, when the national government outsourced it to the new colonies, shipping pre-dyed threads abroad, where labour was cheaper. Forced labour was used; in 1928, 54% of Japan's ikat weaving was done by unpaid prisoners in China and Korea. By the last quarter of the 20th century, few people could afford the time necessary to dye and hand weave their own cloth. However, contemporary artisans continue to produce highly prized textiles using traditional methods.

== Classification and terminology ==
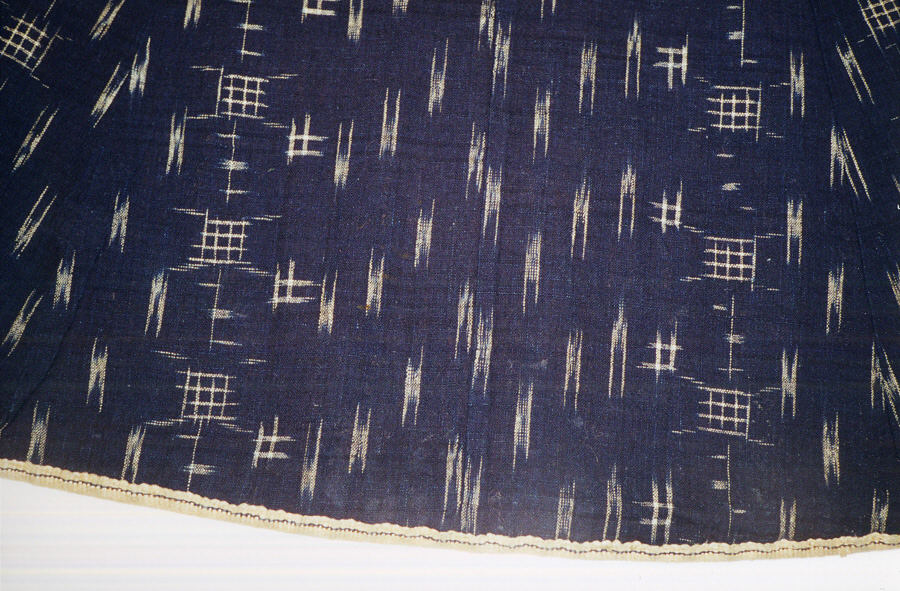
Simple kon gasuri patterns, 19th century

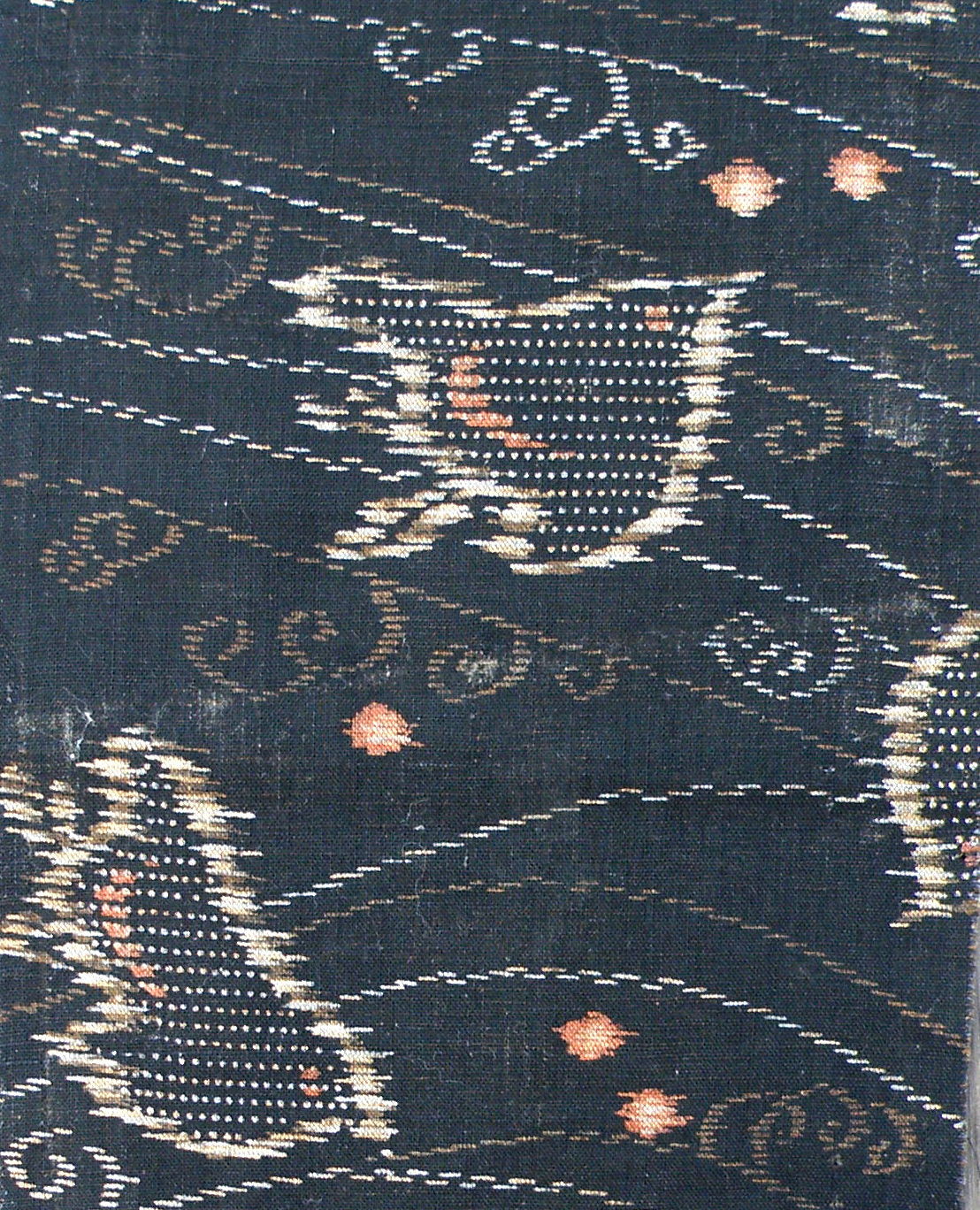
Kasuri fragment from an early-20th century kimono using the e-gasuri (lit. 'picture kasuri') technique to create a picture of plovers. This is also an example of iro gasuri (lit. 'colour kasuri'), in that it uses several colors.

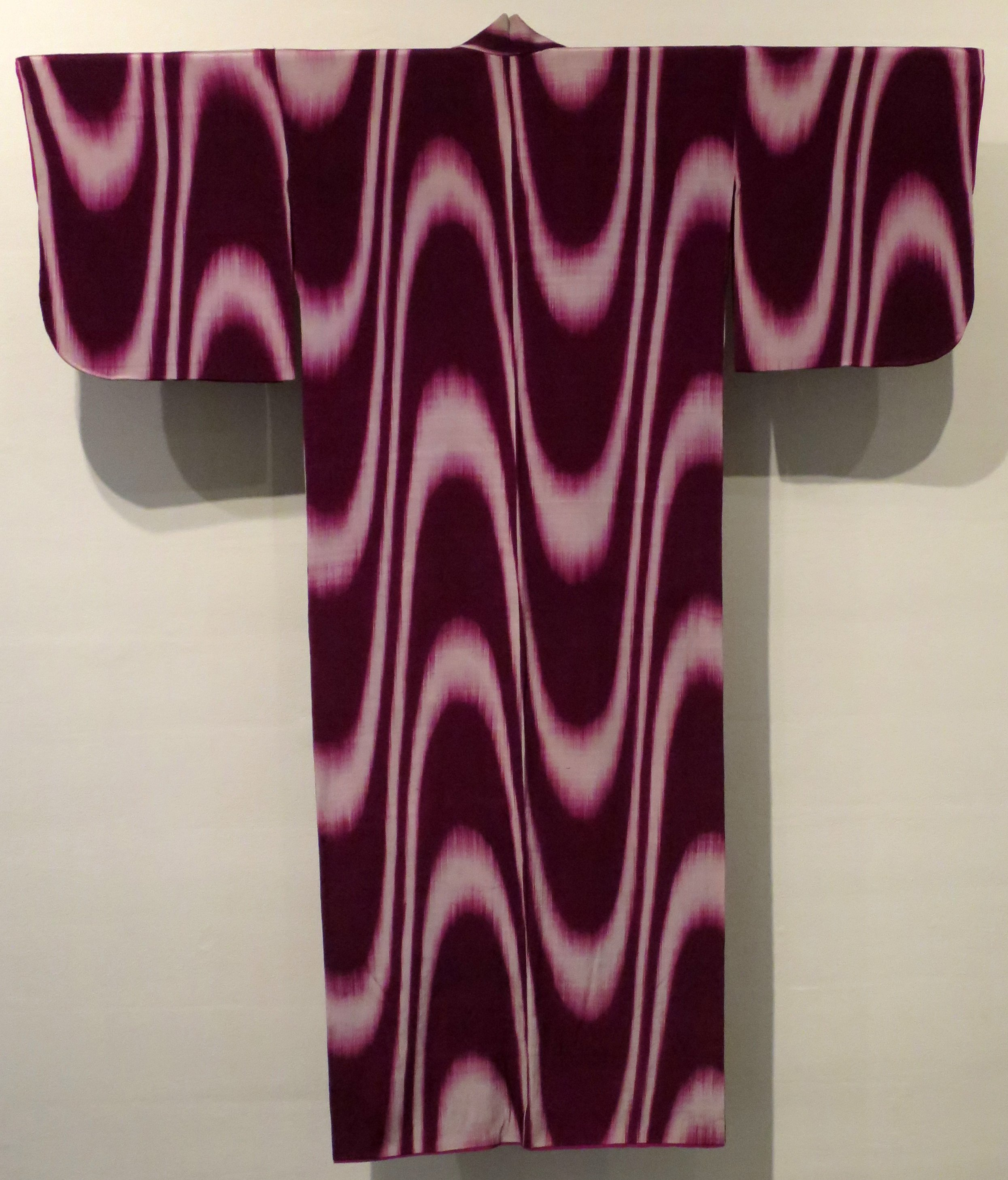
Complex kasuri pattern, tate-yoko gasuri, first half of 20th century

=== Warp and/or weft dyed ===
- Tate gasuri: lit. 'vertical kasuri' where only the warp is dyed
- Yoko gasuri: only the weft is dyed.
- Tate-yoko gasuri: both warp and weft are dyed. Classified as a double ikat technique.

=== Color of dye ===
- Kon gasuri: blue kasuri with white resists on an indigo-blue ground.
- Shiro gasuri: lit. 'white kasuri', an inverse of kon gasuri; blue on a white ground.
- Chia gasuri: kasuri using brown instead of indigo.
- Iro gasuri'un: kasuri using several colors.

=== Technique ===
- Tegukuri gasuri: The yarn bundles are tied or bound by hand.
- Surikomi gasuri: the dye is applied directly to the bundles of stretched yarn with a spatula. This is most frequently used in iro gasuri.
- Itajime gasuri: prior to dyeing, the arranged yarns are placed between two engraved plates or boards. The plates are bolted tightly together so that when they are immersed in the dye, the pressure of the raised points act as a resist.
- Orijime gasuri: weft yarns are woven on a warp of thick cotton yarn. The weft is beaten hard, which packs the weft tightly. When the cloth is dyed, much of the weft is protected from the dye by the heavy warp. The wefts are then woven with new (normal diameter) warps, resulting in a fine dotted pattern. The silk kasuri of Amami Ōshima and the ramie kasuri of Miyakojima, Okinawa are noted for this technique.
- Hogushi gasuri (lit. 'unravel kasuri'): Only the warp is dyed. This can be done by hand-tying the threads. Alternately, the undyed warp is woven with a coarse temporary weft. This cloth is then printed with the design. The temporary weft is removed, and the warp is returned to the loom. The cloth is then woven with a plain weft.
- Heiyo gasuri (lit. 'use-both kasuri'): both warp and weft are dyed, either stencil-printed or dyed by hand-tying.
- Kushi-oshi gasuri: the warp is placed on a special printing board and printed with a block printing technique. The dyed warp is then woven.
- Fukiyose gasuri: the yarns are dyed with a dip-dye technique.
- Bokashi gasuri: prior to dyeing, the yarn is twisted or plaited, so that parts of the yarn create their own resist. See Bokashi (disambiguation).

=== By place of production ===
Due to regional variations, some types of kasuri are classified by place of production. Examples include:

- Ōshima-tsumugi: Silk threads are dyed with mud and dye from the bark of Sharinbai Tree creating a deep black color. The mud dyed kasuri threads are hand woven together to create patterns.
- Kurume: e-gasuri (picture kasuri)
- Nara: hemp fiber kasuri, with shino-gasuri
- Miyakojima, Okinawa: ramie fiber kasuri
- Isesaki, Honshu and Amami Oshima: silk fiber kasuri
- Okinawa: iro-gasuri silk fiber kasuri

== See also ==
- Ikat
- Meisen
- List of Traditional Crafts of Japan
