= Noil =

Short strands rejected from fiber combing

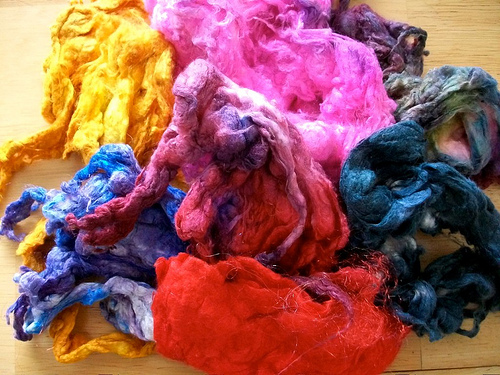
Hand-dyed silk noil

Noil refers to the short fibers that are removed during the combing process in spinning. These fibers are often then used for other purposes.

Fibers are chosen for their length and evenness in specific spinning techniques, such as worsted. The short noil fibers are left over from combing of wool or spinning silk.

Noil may be treated as a shorter-staple fiber and spun, hand-plied, or used as wadding. Noil may also be used as a decorative additive in spinning projects like rovings and yarns. As noil is a relatively short fiber, fabric made from noil is weaker and often considered less valuable than that made using long lengths of longer staple lengths, though it is sometimes valued for aesthetic effects (see Slub (textiles)).

== Silk ==
Silk noil is also called "raw silk", although this is a misnomer.

Silk noil may also be made from the short fibres taken from silkworm cocoons – either fibres that are naturally shorter or fibres broken by emerging silk moths. Rather than the continuous filament length of silk, shorter fibers are silk noil, which has a slightly rough texture. It is relatively weaker and has low resilience. It tends to have very low lustre, which makes it appear more like cotton than silk.

Silk noil is also blended or appended with heavier fabrics like velvets and satins to create varied textures. Made out of the strongest natural fibres (with a protein base) around, noil saris are not as slippery as many synthetic fibres or filament silk. Being silk, it dyes easily, absorbs moisture well, and can also be waterproofed with a polyurethane coating. Such coatings increase their use in furnishings and upholstery.

More recently there is an effort to use silk noil to clean up methylene blue from waterways as it soaks up the chemical at a higher rate than other forms of silk tested.

Silk noil hails from China, whence it was exported to Europe in the Middle Ages, especially to Italy. It was used to create silk blends through the first half of the 14th century. However, over time its use decreased. With an increase in demand and variety of alternatives and low-cost substitutes, noil has re-surfaced, experiencing a sort of revival. In India, noil is used to make saris, materials and furnishings.

== See also ==
- Slub (in textiles), for a list of cloth types made from or with silk noil
- Tsumugi (cloth)
