= Shantung (fabric) =

Tough, plain-woven fabric made from wild silk

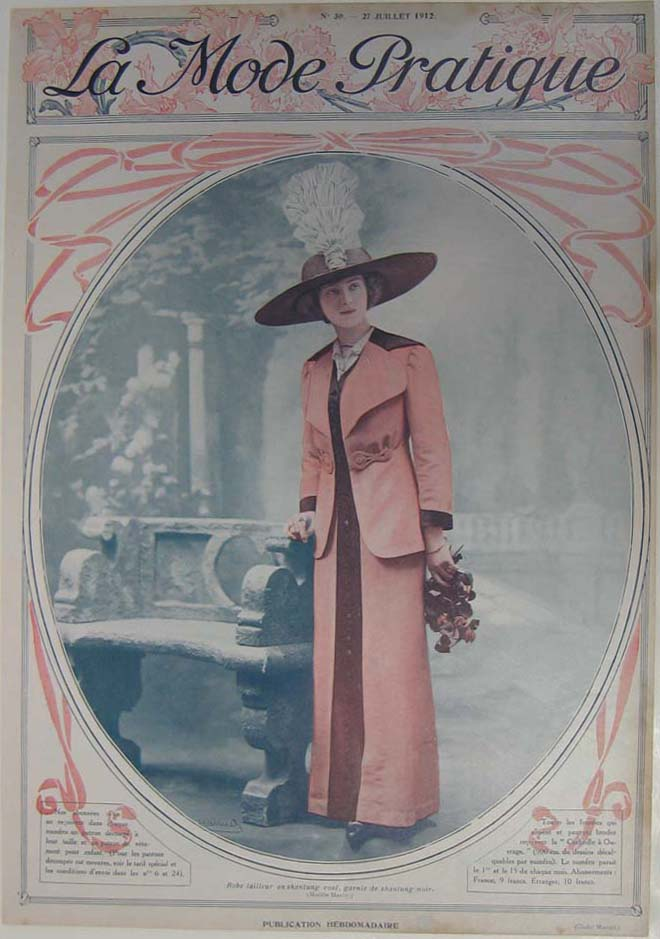
A tailored dress in pink shantung, trimmed with black shantung, 1912.

Shantung is a type of silk plain weave fabric historically from the Chinese province of Shandong. It is similar to dupioni, but is slightly thinner and less irregular. Shantung is often used for bridal gowns.

== Structure ==
Shantung is a fabric with a ribbed surface that is produced by long weft yarns. The surface may vary coarse to fine according to the used yarn type. The thicker yarns were used in the weft. Yarns in shantung may have knots, and bumps (slub effects), etc.

== Types ==
Originally it was made of silk only, but later locals used rayon and cotton Shantung also.
