= Kakunodate Kabazaiku Museum =

Museum in Semboku, Akita, Japan

- 角館樺細工伝承館
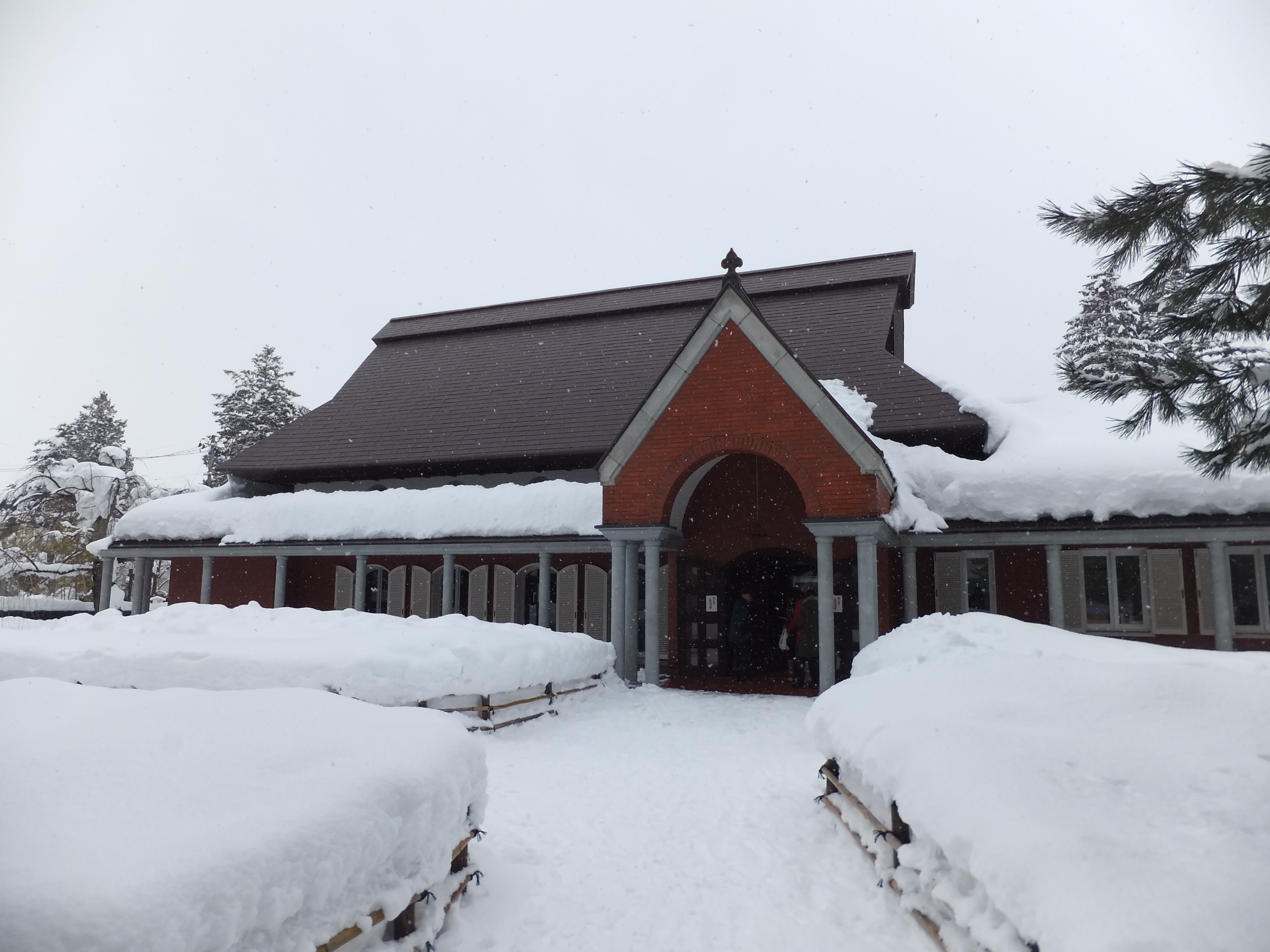

General information
- Location: 10-1 Omote-machi Shimo-chō, Semboku, Akita Prefecture, Japan
- Coordinates: 39°35′58″N 140°33′41″E
- Opened: September 1978

Website
- Official website (in Japanese)

Kakunodate Kabazaiku Museum (仙北市立角館樺細工伝承館, Senboku Shiritsu Kakunodate Kabazaiku Denshōkan), also known in English as Kakunodate Cherry Bark Work Museum, opened in Kakunodate, now Semboku, Akita Prefecture, Japan in 1978. Dedicated to the traditional craft of kabazaiku, there are also displays on other local crafts, including Shiraiwa-yaki ceramics, Kakunodate-shunkei lacquerware, and Itaya-zaiku maple wickerwork.

== See also ==
- List of Traditional Crafts of Japan
- National Crafts Museum
- Kakunodate-matsuri
