= Agano =

Agano may refer to:

- Agano, Niigata, a city in Niigata prefecture, Japan
- Agano River, a river in the Horuriku region of Japan
- Agano, Saitama, a village, now part of the city of Hannō
  - Agano Station, a railway station Hannō, Saitama
- Agano-class cruiser, warships of the Imperial Japanese Navy
  - Japanese cruiser Agano, lead ship of the class
- Agano ware, a type of Japanese pottery
