= List of traditional crafts of Japan =

The traditional crafts of Japan (伝統的工芸品, dentōteki kōgeihin) is a series of Japanese crafts specially recognized and designated as such by the Minister of Economy, Trade and Industry (formerly, the Minister of International Trade and Industry) in accordance with the 1974 Act on the Promotion of Traditional Craft Industries. As of 27 October 2025, 244 crafts have been so designated.

== Background ==
As set out in Article 1 of the 1974 Act, the purpose of traditional craft industries and their promotion is to enrich the lives of the citizens and, due to their particular geographic nature, contribute to the development of local economies and, thereby, that of the nation as a whole. This economic angle helps distinguish the designation of traditional crafts under the 1974 Act from that of traditional crafts as intangible cultural properties under the 1950 Law for the Protection of Cultural Properties. Financial assistance is available under both frameworks; that for traditional crafts focuses on five activities, namely, the training of successors, the recording of technologies and techniques, the securing of raw materials, the evolution of creative concepts and designs, and the development of demand.

== Trends ==
In FY2016, 62,690 individuals were employed in the traditional crafts industry, down from 288,000 in 1979, with production valued at ¥96 billion, down from ¥540 billion in 1983; as of FY2022, the number of individuals engaged in the industry had fallen yet further to 48,334, though the value of production had increased to ¥101 billion. Analysis by the Traditional Crafts Industry Promotion Association locates these trends within the broader context of the changes in lifestyles and employment attendant upon the nation's post-war economic growth, identifying seven principal explanatory strands: displacement by highly industrialized, mass-produced—and, as a consequence, cheaper—mass market goods; the decline of rural areas and the primary industries, such as agriculture and forestry, that provide many of the materials; construction that has posed obstacles to the sourcing of materials; changes in the education system and the employment environment that discourage the necessary apprenticeships from a young age and a life of modest, manual labour; changes in lifestyle amongst consumers, with increasing urbanization and westernization; changes in attitude towards everyday items, with a move towards disposable items chosen on the basis of fashion, novelty, and price; and changes in the family system, with the nuclear family and single households militating against transmission across generations. At the same time, there are a number of possible sources of hope: the increased demand for high-quality products typically concomitant with prosperity; interest in unique, regional cultures; new appreciation of wa and monozukuri, including the burgeoning of demand in the West; and a growing awareness of the benefits of a circular economy.

== Criteria ==
To be eligible for designation, as specified in Article 2 of the 1974 Act, the craft must be:

- primarily for use in everyday life
- predominantly manual in its production processes
- manufactured using traditional technologies and techniques
- chiefly created using traditionally-prepared and -employed materials
- from a particular area, where a not-negligible number of persons are involved in its production

For these purposes, "traditional" means a history and continuity of at least one hundred years; a "not-negligible number of persons" implies at least ten enterprises or thirty individuals, so as to ensure a scale of operations sufficient to uphold reliability; if the relevant raw materials have been exhausted or are now extremely difficult to source, a substitute is permissible so long as the flavour of the original is not lost; "technologies and techniques" refer to the skills and practices of the individual craftsman as well as the know-how accumulated within the industry, with refinements permitted so long as the craftworks' key characteristics remain fundamentally unchanged; "predominantly manual" requires the craftwork's form, features, and quality to be the product of the hand, although usage of machinery is permitted for auxiliary processes; and "use in everyday life" may include occasional and one-off events such as festivals, weddings, and funerals, if closely connected to ordinary households.

== Traditional crafts ==
With the designation of crafts in Chiba Prefecture and Kumamoto Prefecture in 2003, and of two craft traditions pertaining to the Ainu of Hokkaidō in 2013, at least one craft has been designated in each of the 47 prefectures. As of 27 October 2025, Tokyo has the highest number of designated crafts (23), followed by Niigata Prefecture and Kyōto Prefecture (17), Okinawa Prefecture (16), Aichi Prefecture (15), and Ishikawa Prefecture (10), Aomori Prefecture and Ōita Prefecture having but one apiece. The 244 designated crafts are divided into fifteen categories: woven textiles (38), dyed textiles (14), other textiles (5), ceramics (33), lacquerware (23), wood and bamboo (33), metalwork (16), Butsudan and Buddhist ritual implements (17), washi (9), writing tools (10), stonework (4), precious stonework (2), dolls and kokeshi (10), other (27), and craft materials and tools (3).

Craft	Prefecture	Comments	Image	Designation	Type	Ref.
Nambu Ironware 南部鉄器; Nanbu-tekki	Iwate			1975	metalwork	
Yamagata-imono 山形鋳物; Yamagata-imono	Yamagata			1975	metalwork	
Murayama Ōshima-tsumugi 村山大島紬; Murayama Ōshima-tsumugi	Tokyo			1975	woven textiles	
Shiozawa-tsumugi 塩沢紬; Shiozawa-tsumugi	Niigata			1975	woven textiles	
Takaoka Copperware 高岡銅器; Takaoka-dōki	Toyama			1975	metalwork	
Shinshū-tsumugi 信州紬; Shinshū-tsumugi	Nagano			1975	woven textiles	
Kiso Lacquerware 木曽漆器; Kiso-shikki	Nagano			1975	lacquerware	
Hida-shunkei Lacquerware 飛騨春慶; Hida-shunkei	Gifu			1975	lacquerware	
Honba Ōshima-tsumugi 本場大島紬; Honba Ōshima-tsumugi	Miyazaki, Kagoshima			1975	woven textiles	
Kumejima-tsumugi 久米島紬; Kumejima-tsumugi	Okinawa			1975	woven textiles	
Miyako-jōfu 宮古上布; Miyako-jōfu	Okinawa			1975	woven textiles	
Tsugaru Lacquerware 津軽塗; Tsugaru-nuri	Aomori			1975	lacquerware	
Aizu Lacquerware 会津塗; Aizu-nuri	Fukushima			1975	lacquerware	
Isesaki-kasuri 伊勢崎絣; Isesaki-kasuri	Gunma			1975	woven textiles	
Inami Woodcarving 井波彫刻; Inami-chōkoku	Toyama			1975	wood/bamboo	
Kaga-yūzen 加賀友禅; Kaga-yūzen	Ishikawa			1975	dyed textiles	
Kutani Ware 九谷焼; Kutani-yaki	Ishikawa			1975	ceramics	
Wajima-nuri 輪島塗; Wajima-nuri	Ishikawa			1975	lacquerware	
Yamanaka Lacquerware 山中漆器; Yamanaka-shikki	Ishikawa			1975	lacquerware	
Echizen Lacquerware 越前漆器; Echizen-shikki	Fukui			1975	lacquerware	
Ichii ittō bori 一位一刀彫; Ichii ittō bori	Gifu			1975	wood/bamboo	
Hikone Butsudan 彦根仏壇; Hikone butsudan	Shiga			1975	Butsudan/Buddhist ritual implements	
Takayama chasen 高山茶筌; Takayama chasen	Nara			1975	wood/bamboo	
Inshū Washi 因州和紙; Inshū-washi	Tottori			1975	washi	
Kumano Brushes 熊野筆; Kumano-fude	Hiroshima			1975	writing tools	
Koishiwara Ware 小石原焼; Koishiwara-yaki	Fukuoka			1975	ceramics	
Kawanabe Butsudan 川辺仏壇; Kawanabe butsudan	Kagoshima			1975	Butsudan/Buddhist ritual implements	
Ojiya-chijimi 小千谷縮; Ojiya-chijimi	Niigata			1975	woven textiles	
Ojiya-tsumugi 小千谷紬; Ojiya-tsumugi	Niigata			1975	woven textiles	
Takaoka Lacquerware 高岡漆器; Takaoka-shikki	Toyama			1975	lacquerware	
Iiyama Butsudan 飯山仏壇; Iiyama butsudan	Nagano			1975	Butsudan/Buddhist ritual implements	
Arimatsu-Narumi shibori 有松・鳴海絞; Arimatsu・Narumi shibori	Aichi			1975	dyed textiles	
Shigaraki Ware 信楽焼; Shigaraki-yaki	Shiga			1975	ceramics	
Ōsaka Ranma 大阪欄間; Ōsaka-ranma	Ōsaka			1975	wood/bamboo	
Yumihama-gasuri 弓浜絣; Yumihama-gasuri	Tottori			1975	woven textiles	
Kabazaiku 樺細工; Kabazaiku	Akita			1976	wood/bamboo	
Oitama-tsumugi 置賜紬; Oitama-tsumugi	Yamagata			1976	woven textiles	
Murakami kibori tsuishu 村上木彫堆朱; Murakami kibori tsuishu	Niigata			1976	lacquerware	
Matsumoto Furniture 松本家具; Matsumoto-kagu	Nagano			1976	wood/bamboo	
Nishijin-ori 西陣織; Nishijin-ori	Kyōto	vid. Nishijin Textile Center		1976	woven textiles	
Kyō kanoko shibori 京京鹿の子絞; Kyō kanoko shibori	Kyōto			1976	dyed textiles	
Kyō Butsudan 京仏壇; Kyō butsudan	Kyōto			1976	Butsudan/Buddhist ritual implements	
Kyō Buddhist Ritual Implements 京仏具; Kyō-butsugu	Kyōto			1976	Butsudan/Buddhist ritual implements	
Kyō Lacquerware 京漆器; Kyō-shikki	Kyōto			1976	lacquerware	
Kagawa Lacquerware 香川漆器; Kagawa-shikki	Kagawa			1976	lacquerware	
Hakata Dolls 博多人形; Hakata-ningyō	Fukuoka			1976	dolls/kokeshi	
Tokyo some komon 東京染小紋; Tōkyō some komon	Tokyo			1976	dyed textiles	
Kanazawa Butsudan 金沢仏壇; Kanazawa butsudan	Ishikawa			1976	Butsudan/Buddhist ritual implements	
Echizen Washi 越前和紙; Echizen-washi	Fukui			1976	washi	
Wakasa Agate Craft 若狭めのう細工; Wakasa menō zaiku	Fukui			1976	precious stonework	
Kōshū Rock Crystal and Precious Stone Carving 甲州水晶貴石細工; Kōshū suishō kiseki zaiku	Yamanashi			1976	precious stonework	
Uchiyama-gami 内山紙; Uchiyama-gami	Nagano			1976	washi	
Tokoname Ware 常滑焼; Tokoname-yaki	Aichi			1976	ceramics	
Kyō-yūzen 京友禅; Kyō-yūzen	Kyōto			1976	dyed textiles	
Kyō-komon 京小紋; Kyō-komon	Kyōto			1976	dyed textiles	
Kyō kuromontsuki zome 京黒紋付染; Kyō kuromontsuki zome	Kyōto			1976	dyed textiles	
Kyō Joinery 京指物; Kyō-sashimono	Kyōto			1976	wood/bamboo	
Banshū Soroban 播州そろばん; Banshū-soroban	Hyōgo			1976	writing tools	
Izumo Stone Lanterns 出雲石燈ろう; Izumo ishi-dōrō	Tottori, Shimane			1976	stonework	
Hakata-ori 博多織; Hakata-ori	Fukuoka			1976	woven textiles	
Kurume-gasuri 久留米絣; Kurume-gasuri	Fukuoka			1976	woven textiles	
Yomitanzan Hana-ori 読谷山花織; Yomitanzan hanaori	Okinawa			1976	woven textiles	
Yuntanza-minsaa 読谷山ミンサー; Yuntanza-minsã	Okinawa			1976	woven textiles	
Tsuboya Ware 壺屋焼; Tsuboya-yaki	Okinawa			1976	ceramics	
Kawatsura Lacquerware 川連漆器; Kawatsura-shikki	Akita			1976	lacquerware	
Hon-shiozawa 本塩沢; Hon-shiozawa	Niigata			1976	woven textiles	
Kamo Paulownia tansu 加茂桐箪笥; Kamo kiri-tansu	Niigata			1976	wood/bamboo	
Suruga Bamboo Crafts 駿河竹千筋細工; Suruga take sensuji zaiku	Shizuoka			1976	wood/bamboo	
Nagoya Butsudan 名古屋仏壇; Nagoya butsudan	Aichi			1976	Butsudan/Buddhist ritual implements	
Mikawa Butsudan 三河仏壇; Mikawa butsudan	Aichi			1976	Butsudan/Buddhist ritual implements	
Toyohashi Brushes 豊橋筆; Toyohashi-fude	Aichi			1976	writing tools	
Iga-kumihimo 伊賀くみひも; Iga-kumihimo	Mie			1976	other textiles	
Kyō-nui Embroidery 京繍; Kyō-nui	Kyōto			1976	other textiles	
Kyō-kumihimo 京くみひも; Kyō-kumihimo	Kyōto			1976	other textiles	
Akama Inkstones 赤間硯; Akama-suzuri	Yamaguchi			1976	writing tools	
Awa Washi 阿波和紙; Awa-washi	Tokushima			1976	washi	
Tobe Ware 砥部焼; Tobe-yaki	Ehime			1976	ceramics	
Tosa Washi 土佐和紙; Tosa-washi	Kōchi	vid. Ino Paper Museum		1976	washi	
Yūki-tsumugi 結城紬; Yūki-tsumugi	Ibaraki, Tochigi			1977	woven textiles	
Akazu Ware 赤津焼; Akazu-yaki	Aichi			1977	ceramics	
Ōmi-jōfu 近江上布; Ōmi-jōfu	Shiga			1977	woven textiles	
Kyō Ware・Kiyomizu Ware 京焼・清水焼; Kyō-yaki・Kiyomizu-yaki	Kyōto			1977	ceramics	
Yame Fukushima Butsudan 八女福島仏壇; Yame Fukushima butsudan	Fukuoka			1977	Butsudan/Buddhist ritual implements	
Kanazawa Gold Leaf 金沢箔; Kanazawa-haku	Ishikawa	vid. Kanazawa Yasue Gold Leaf Museum		1977	materials & tools	
Kiryū-ori 桐生織; Kiryū-ori	Gunma			1977	woven textiles	
Honba Kihachijō 本場黄八丈; Honba ki-Hachijō	Tokyo			1977	woven textiles	
Kyō-sensu Fans 京扇子; Kyō-sensu	Kyōto			1977	other	
Kyō-uchiwa Fans 京うちわ; Kyō-uchiwa	Kyōto			1977	other	
Ōsaka Karaki Joinery 大阪唐木指物; Ōsaka karaki sashimono	Ōsaka			1977	wood/bamboo	
Nara Brushes 奈良筆; Nara-fude	Nara			1977	writing tools	
Ōzu Washi 大洲和紙; Ōzu-washi	Ehime			1977	washi	
Imari Ware・Arita Ware 伊万里・有田焼; Imari・Arita-yaki	Saga			1977	ceramics	
Ōborisōma Ware 大堀相馬焼; Ōborisōma-yaki	Fukushima			1978	ceramics	
Wakasa Lacquerware 若狭塗; Wakasa-nuri	Fukui			1978	lacquerware	
Edo Kimekomi Dolls 江戸木目込人形; Edo kimekomi-ningyō	Saitama, Tokyo			1978	dolls/kokeshi	
Tamba-Tachikui Ware 丹波立杭焼; Tanba tachikui-yaki	Hyōgo			1978	ceramics	
Kishū Lacquerware 紀州漆器; Kishū-shikki	Wakayama			1978	lacquerware	
Hiroshima Butsudan 広島仏壇; Hiroshima butsudan	Hiroshima			1978	Butsudan/Buddhist ritual implements	
Mikawachi Ware 三川内焼; Mikawachi-yaki	Nagasaki			1978	ceramics	
Hasami Ware 波佐見焼; Hasami-yaki	Nagasaki			1978	ceramics	
Shōgawa Woodcraft 庄川挽物木地; Shōgawa hikimono kiji	Toyama			1978	materials & tools	
Mino Ware 美濃焼; Mino-yaki	Gifu			1978	ceramics	
Nanao Butsudan 七尾仏壇; Nanao butsudan	Ishikawa			1978	Butsudan/Buddhist ritual implements	
Awa shōai shijira-ori 阿波正藍しじら織; Awa shōai shijira-ori	Tokushima			1978	woven textiles	
Tokyo Silverware 東京銀器; Tōkyō-ginki	Tokyo			1979	metalwork	
Echizen Forged Blades 越前打刃物; Echizen-uchihamono	Fukui			1979	metalwork	
Kamakura-bori 鎌倉彫; Kamakura-bori	Kanagawa			1979	lacquerware	
Yokkaichi Banko Ware 四日市萬古焼; Yokkaichi banko-yaki	Mie			1979	ceramics	
Mashiko Ware 益子焼; Mashiko-yaki	Tochigi			1979	ceramics	
Kasukabe Paulownia Chests 春日部桐箪笥; Kasukabe kiri-tansu	Saitama			1979	wood/bamboo	
Okazaki Stonework 岡崎石工品; Okazaki sekkōhin	Aichi			1979	stonework	
Ushikubi-tsumugi 牛首紬; Ushikubi-tsumugi	Ishikawa			1979	woven textiles	
Katsuyama Bamboo Crafts 勝山竹細工; Katsuyama take-zaiku	Okayama			1979	wood/bamboo	
Beppu Bamboo Crafts 別府竹細工; Beppu take-zaiku	Ōita			1979	wood/bamboo	
Yamagata Butsudan 山形仏壇; Yamagata butsudan	Yamagata			1980	Butsudan/Buddhist ritual implements	
Tokyo tegaki-yūzen 東京手描友禅; Tōkyō tegaki-yūzen	Tokyo			1980	dyed textiles	
Tama-ori 多摩織; Tama-ori	Tokyo			1980	woven textiles	
Kanazawa Lacquerware 金沢漆器; Kanazawa-shikki	Ishikawa			1980	lacquerware	
Nagiso Woodturning 南木曽ろくろ細工; Nagiso rokuro-zaiku	Nagano			1980	wood/bamboo	
Izushi Ware 出石焼; Izushi-yaki	Hyōgo			1980	ceramics	
Ōdate-magewappa 大館曲げわっぱ; Ōdate-magewappa	Akita			1980	wood/bamboo	
Niigata Shirone Butsudan 新潟・白根仏壇; Niigata shirone butsudan	Niigata			1980	Butsudan/Buddhist ritual implements	
Nagaoka Butsudan 長岡仏壇; Nagaoka butsudan	Niigata			1980	Butsudan/Buddhist ritual implements	
Sanjō Butsudan 三条仏壇; Sanjō butsudan	Niigata			1980	Butsudan/Buddhist ritual implements	
Suzuka Ink 鈴鹿墨; Suzuka-sumi	Mie			1980	writing tools	
Miyagi Traditional Kokeshi 宮城伝統こけし; Miyagi dentō kokeshi	Miyagi			1981	dolls/kokeshi	
Tsubame-tsuiki Copperware 燕鎚起銅器; Tsubame-tsuiki dōki	Niigata			1981	metalwork	
Nagoya Paulownia tansu 名古屋桐箪笥; Nagoya kiri-tansu	Aichi			1981	wood/bamboo	
Iwayadō-tansu 岩谷堂箪笥; Iwayadō-tansu	Iwate			1982	wood/bamboo	
Kyōto Stonework 京石工芸品; Kyō ishi kōgeihin	Kyōto			1982	stonework	
Sakai Forged Blades 堺打刃物; Sakai-uchihamono	Ōsaka			1982	metalwork	
Shinshū Forged Blades 信州打刃物; Shinshū-uchihamono	Nagano			1982	metalwork	
Tōkamachi-kasuri 十日町絣; Tōkamachi-gasuri	Niigata			1982	woven textiles	
Tōkamachi Akashi chijimi 十日町明石ちぢみ; Tōkamachi Akashi chijimi	Niigata			1982	woven textiles	
Iga Ware 伊賀焼; Iga-yaki	Mie			1982	ceramics	
Bizen Ware 備前焼; Bizen-yaki	Okayama			1982	ceramics	
Miyajima Woodwork 宮島細工; Miyajima-zaiku	Hiroshima			1982	wood/bamboo	
Ōsaka Butsudan 大阪仏壇; Ōsaka butsudan	Ōsaka			1982	Butsudan/Buddhist ritual implements	
Ryūkyū-kasuri 琉球絣; Ryūkyū-kasuri	Okinawa			1983	woven textiles	
Shuri-ori 首里織; Shuri-ori	Okinawa			1983	woven textiles	
Nagoya-yūzen 名古屋友禅; Nagoya-yūzen	Aichi			1983	dyed textiles	
Nagoya kuromontsuki zome 名古屋黒紋付染; Nagoya kuromontsuki zome	Aichi			1983	dyed textiles	
Ōsaka Naniwa-suzuki 大阪浪華錫器; Ōsaka Naniwa suzu-ki	Ōsaka			1983	metalwork	
Agano Ware 上野焼; Agano-yaki	Fukuoka			1983	ceramics	
Ise-katagami 伊勢形紙; Ise-katagami	Mie			1983	materials & tools	
Ryūkyū Bingata 琉球びんがた; Ryūkyū-bingata	Okinawa			1984	woven textiles	
Akita Cedar Tubs and Barrels 秋田杉桶樽; Akita sugi oke taru	Akita			1984	wood/bamboo	
Odawara Lacquerware 小田原漆器; Odawara-shikki	Kanagawa			1984	lacquerware	
Hakone Yosegi-zaiku 箱根寄木細工; Hakone yosegi-zaiku	Kanagawa			1984	wood/bamboo	
Hidehira Lacquerware 秀衡塗; Hidehira-nuri	Iwate			1985	lacquerware	
Jōbōji Lacquerware 浄法寺塗; Jōbōji-nuri	Iwate			1985	lacquerware	
Mino Washi 美濃和紙; Mino-washi	Gifu			1985	washi	
Ogatsu Inkstones 雄勝硯; Ogatsu-suzuri	Miyagi			1985	writing tools	
Unshū Soroban 雲州そろばん; Unshū-soroban	Shimane			1985	writing tools	
Fukuyama Koto 福山琴; Fukuyama koto	Hiroshima			1985	other	
Ryūkyū Lacquerware 琉球漆器; Ryūkyū-shikki	Okinawa			1986	lacquerware	
Echizen Ware 越前焼; Echizen-yaki	Fukui			1986	ceramics	
Echigo Yoita Forged Blades 越後与板打刃物; Echigo Yoita uchihamono	Niigata			1986	metalwork	
Kyōto Dolls 京人形; Kyō-ningyō	Kyōto			1986	dolls/kokeshi	
Yonaguni-ori 与那国織; Yonaguni-ori	Okinawa			1987	woven textiles	
Kōshū-inden 甲州印伝; Kōshū-inden	Yamanashi			1987	other	
Banshū Fishing flies 播州毛鉤; Banshū-kebari	Hyōgo			1987	other	
Kishū-tansu 紀州箪笥; Kishū-tansu	Wakayama			1987	wood/bamboo	
Kijōka-bashōfu 喜如嘉の芭蕉布; Kijōka no bashōfu	Okinawa			1988	woven textiles	
Etchū Washi 越中和紙; Etchū-washi	Toyama			1988	washi	
Karatsu Ware 唐津焼; Karatsu-yaki	Saga			1988	ceramics	
Yaeyama-minsaa 八重山ミンサー; Yaeyama-minsã	Okinawa			1989	woven textiles	
Yaeyama-jōfu 八重山上布; Yaeyama-jōfu	Okinawa			1989	woven textiles	
Sekishū Washi 石州和紙; Sekishū-washi	Shimane			1989	washi	
Ōsaka Senshū Paulownia tansu 大阪泉州桐箪笥; Ōsaka Senshū kiri-tansu	Ōsaka			1989	wood/bamboo	
Ōuchi Lacquerware 大内塗; Ōuchi-nuri	Yamaguchi			1989	lacquerware	
Kaga-nui Embroidery 加賀繍; Kaga-nui	Ishikawa			1991	other textiles	
Naruko Lacquerware 鳴子漆器; Naruko-shikki	Miyagi			1991	lacquerware	
Edo wazao 江戸和竿; Edo-wazao	Tokyo			1991	wood/bamboo	
Toyooka Willow Wickerwork 豊岡杞柳細工; Toyooka kiryū zaiku	Hyōgo			1992	wood/bamboo	
Kasama Ware 笠間焼; Kasama-yaki	Ibaraki			1992	ceramics	
Aizuhongō Ware 会津本郷焼; Aizuhongō-yaki	Fukushima			1993	ceramics	
Iwami Ware 石見焼; Iwami-yaki	Shimane			1994	ceramics	
Miyakonojō Bows 都城大弓; Miyakonojō-daikyū	Miyazaki			1994	wood/bamboo	
Suruga Hina Doll Accessories 駿河雛具; Suruga-hinagu	Shizuoka			1994	dolls/kokeshi	
Suruga Hina Dolls 駿河雛人形; Suruga hina ningyō	Shizuoka			1994	dolls/kokeshi	
Gifu Lanterns 岐阜提灯; Gifu-chōchin	Gifu			1995	other	
Owari Cloisonné 尾張七宝; Owari-shippō	Aichi			1995	other	
Makabe Stone Lanterns 真壁石燈籠; Makabe ishi-doro	Ibaraki			1995	stonework	
Tendō Shōgi-koma 天童将棋駒; Tendō shōgi-koma	Yamagata			1996	other	
Ōsaka Kongō Sudare 大阪金剛簾; Ōsaka kongō sudare	Ōsaka			1996	wood/bamboo	
Banshū Miki Forged Blades 播州三木打刃物; Banshū Miki uchihamono	Hyōgo			1996	metalwork	
Edo Joinery 江戸指物; Edo-sashimono	Tokyo			1997	wood/bamboo	
Seto-sometsuke Ware 瀬戸染付焼; Seto-sometsuke-yaki	Aichi			1997	ceramics	
Kyō-hyōgu 京表具; Kyō-hyōgu	Kyōto	mountings for byōbu, fusuma, makimono, &c.		1997	other	
Marugame-uchiwa Fans 丸亀うちわ; Marugame-uchiwa	Kagawa			1997	other	
Tosa Forged Blades 土佐打刃物; Tosa-uchihamono	Kōchi			1998	metalwork	
Edo karakami 江戸からかみ; Edo-karakami	Tokyo			1999	other	
Kōshū Hand-carved Seals 甲州手彫印章; Kōshū te-bori inshō	Yamanashi			2000	other	
Yame Lanterns 八女提灯; Yame-chōchin	Fukuoka			2001	other	
Edo kiriko 江戸切子; Edo-kiriko	Tokyo			2002	other	
Hagi Ware 萩焼; Hagi-yaki	Yamaguchi			2002	ceramics	
Satsuma Ware 薩摩焼; Satsuma-yaki	Kagoshima			2002	ceramics	
Bōshū-uchiwa Fans 房州うちわ; Bōshū-uchiwa	Chiba			2003	other	
Niigata Lacquerware 新潟漆器; Niigata-shikki	Niigata			2003	lacquerware	
Shōdai Ware 小代焼; Shōdai-yaki	Kumamoto			2003	ceramics	
Amakusa Pottery 天草陶磁器; Amakusa-tōjiki	Kumamoto			2003	ceramics	
Higo Inlay 肥後象がん; Higo-zōgan	Kumamoto			2003	metalwork	
Ōtani Ware 大谷焼; Ōtani-yaki	Tokushima			2003	ceramics	
Okuaizu Basketry 奥会津編み組細工; Okuaizu amikumi-zaiku	Fukushima			2003	wood/bamboo	
Kawajiri Brushes 川尻筆; Kawajiri-fude	Hiroshima			2004	writing tools	
Uetsu-shinafu 羽越しな布; Uetsu-shinafu	Yamagata, Niigata			2005	woven textiles	
Iwatsuki Dolls 岩槻人形; Iwatsuki-ningyō	Saitama	vid. Iwatsuki Ningyō Museum		2007	dolls/kokeshi	
Edo Seasonal Festival Dolls 江戸節句人形; Edo sekku ningyō	Tokyo			2007	dolls/kokeshi	
Edo Woodblock Prints 江戸木版画; Edo mokuhanga	Tokyo			2007	other	
Echigo Sanjō Forged Blades 越後三条打刃物; Echigo Sanjō uchihamono	Niigata			2009	metalwork	
Chibana Hana-ori 知花花織; Chibana hanaori	Okinawa			2012	woven textiles	
Nibutani-ita 二風谷イタ; Nibutani-ita	Hokkaidō	carved wooden trays		2013	wood/bamboo	
Nibutani-attushi 二風谷アットゥㇱ; Nibutani-attushi	Hokkaidō			2013	woven textiles	
Kishū-herazao 紀州へら竿; Kishū-herazao	Wakayama			2013	wood/bamboo	
Chichibu-meisen 秩父銘仙; Chichibu-meisen	Saitama			2013	woven textiles	
Echizen-tansu 越前箪笥; Echizen-tansu	Fukui			2013	wood/bamboo	
Yamaga Lanterns 山鹿灯籠; Yamaga-tōrō	Kumamoto	vid. Yamaga Lantern Festival, Yamaga Lantern Folk Art Museum		2013	other	
Edo Glass 江戸硝子; Edo-garasu	Tokyo			2014	other	
Sendai-tansu 仙台箪笥; Sendai-tansu	Miyagi			2015	wood/bamboo	
Edo Tortoiseshell Crafts 江戸べっ甲; Edo-bekkō	Tokyo			2015	other	
Tokyo Antimony Crafts 東京アンチモニー工芸品; Tōkyō anchimonī kōgeihin	Tokyo			2015	metalwork	
Owari Buddhist Ritual Implements 尾張仏具; Owari-butsugu	Aichi			2017	Butsudan/Buddhist ritual implements	
Nagasaki Tortoiseshell Crafts 長崎べっ甲; Nagasaki-bekkō	Nagasaki			2017	other	
Haebaru Hana-ori 南風原花織; Haebaru hanaori	Okinawa			2017	woven textiles	
Okuaizu Shōwa Karamushi-ori 奥会津昭和からむし織; Okuaizu Shōwa karamushi-ori	Fukushima			2017	woven textiles	
Chiba Artisan Tools 千葉工匠具; Chiba kōshō-gu	Chiba			2017	metalwork	
Tokyo Mujizome 東京無地染; Tōkyō muji-zome	Tokyo			2017	dyed textiles	
Etchū Fukuoka Sedge Hats 越中福岡の菅笠; Etchū Fukuoka no suge-gasa	Toyama			2017	other	
Sanshū Onigawara Crafts 三州鬼瓦工芸品; Sanshū onigawara kōgeihin	Aichi			2017	ceramics	
Nara Ink 奈良墨; Nara-sumi	Nara			2018	writing tools	
Sanshin 三線; Sanshin	Okinawa			2018	other	
Gyōda Tabi 行田足袋; Gyōda-tabi	Saitama			2019	other textiles	
Edo Oshi-e 江戸押絵; Edo oshi-e	Tokyo			2019	dolls/kokeshi	
Naniwa Honzome 浪華本染め; Naniwa honzome	Ōsaka			2019	dyed textiles	
Nagoya Seasonal Festival Decorations 名古屋節句飾; Nagoya sekku kazari	Aichi			2021	dolls/kokeshi	
Gifu Umbrellas 岐阜和傘; Gifu wagasa	Gifu			2022	wood/bamboo	
Tokyo Shamisen 東京三味線; Tōkyō shamisen	Tokyo			2022	other	
Tokyo Koto 東京琴; Tōkyō koto	Tokyo			2022	other	
Edo-hyōgu 江戸表具; Edo-hyōgu	Tokyo	mountings for hanging scrolls		2022	other	
Tokyo Honzome Chūsen 東京本染注染; Tōkyō honzome chūsen	Tokyo			2023	dyed textiles	
Sado Mumyōi Ware 佐渡無名異焼; Sado mumyōi-yaki	Niigata			2024	ceramics	
Izumi Glass いずみガラス; Izumi garasu	Ōsaka			2024	other	
Tokyo Hand-carved Seals 東京手彫り印章; Tōkyō te-bori inshō	Tokyo			2025	other	

== See also ==
- National Crafts Museum
- Folk cultural properties
- Mingei
