= Monozukuri =

Ethos of manufacturing in Japan

Monozukuri (alternatively spelled monodzukuri, and literally meaning "production" or "making of things") is the Japanese term for manufacturing. The broader meaning encompasses a synthesis of technological prowess, know-how, and spirit of Japan's manufacturing practices. The spirit includes a sincere attitude towards production with pride, skill, and dedication and the pursuit of innovation and perfection. It is currently a buzzword in Japan and many Japanese people believe that monozukuri has led Japan to a dominant position in the world market.

== Overview ==
The Japanese word monozukuri (ものづくり) is a combination of 'mono' meaning thing and 'zukuri' meaning the act of making. It simply means craftsmanship or manufacturing and has come to be used as a buzzword in industry and mass media to embody the Japanese spirit and history of manufacturing. It is a word of Japanese origin and has only recently, since the latter half of the 1990s, come to mean manufacturing and production. Its usage was popularized after the promulgation of the Basic Act on the Promotion of Core Manufacturing Technology on March 19, 1999.

== History ==
The history of monozukuri can be traced back approximately 1,000 years. Its origins coincide with the relocation of the capital to Kyoto in the year 794, making Kyoto the political center and cultural hub of Japan. Monozukuri's cultural roots were influenced by Zen Buddhism and Shintoism. Monozukuri draws from the principles of Zen Buddhism, focusing on mindfulness, discipline, and the pursuit of perfection. Artisans are encouraged to focus fully on the present moment, allowing for deeper attention to fine details. Additionally, Shintoism's influence sees craftsmen seeing materials as living beings with natural beauty or the way Dr. Yoshida has put it: "simple feelings of the creator’s nature are poured into the work, and the resultant product is considered to be suitable for nature". This spiritual connection is reflected in the crafting process, where artisans try to place their spirit, emotions, and creativity into their work.

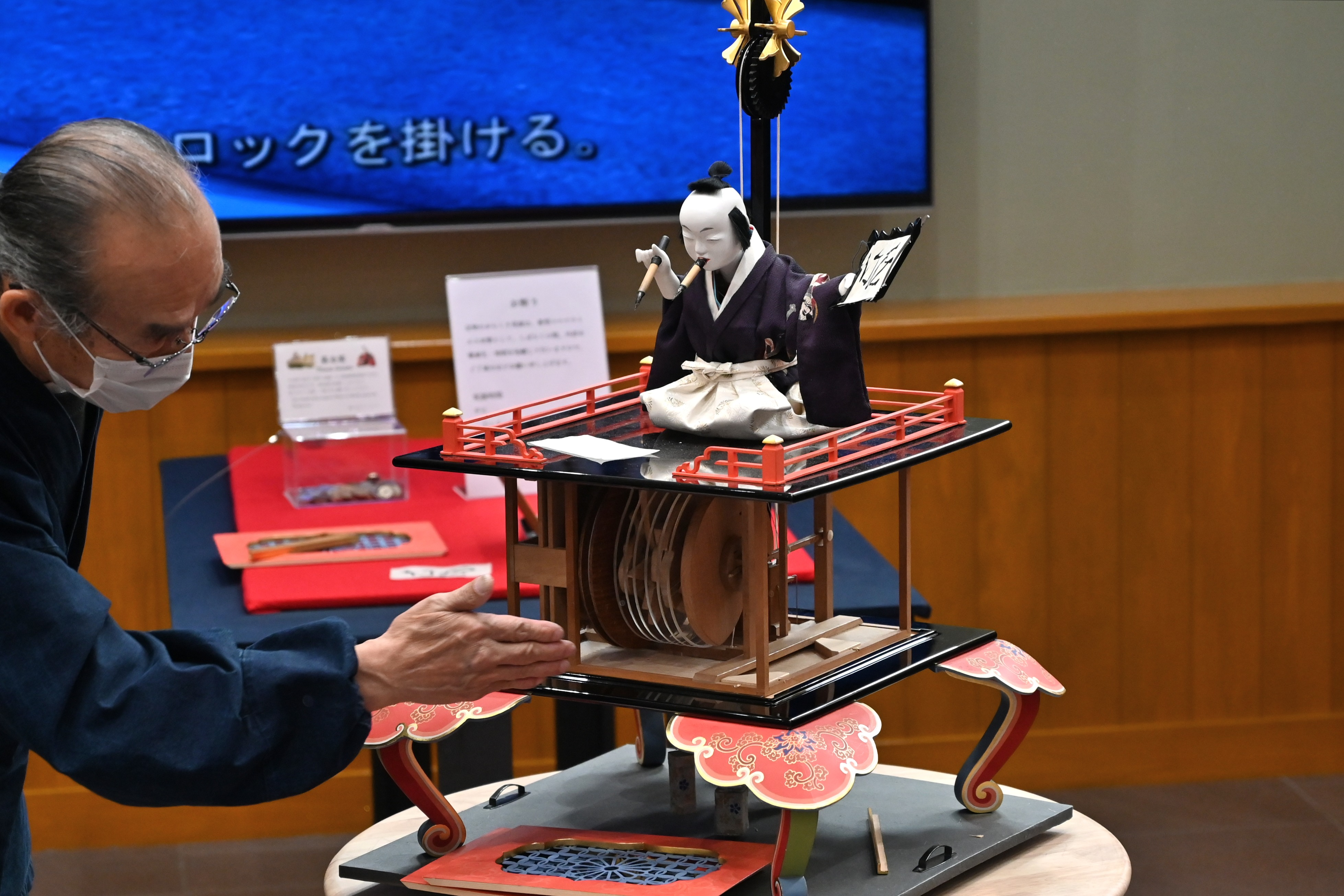
Example of a Karakuri

Pottery and woodworking were common examples of monozukuri. Japanese pottery, inspired by flora and fauna strikes a balance between, " form, texture, and the indomitable spirit of the artisans who breathe life into each piece." Meanwhile, woodworking uses chisels and saws to forge crafts of timber that have delicate attention to detail to achieve near perfection. However, one of the earliest and most renowned demonstrations of monozukuri's impact was evident in the creation of Karakuri mechanical dolls. These dolls were known to feature intricate clockwork mechanisms and the mechanical skills required for them would carry over into the 19th century. In the late 19th century, Japan started industrializing and modernizing. During this time, Dr. Mateja Kovacic claims artisans in regions like Nagoya, known for their mastery of woodcraft, started shifting their skills to iron and other materials. This transition paved the path for Nagoya artisans to have a more prominent role in the industrialization of Japan.

A word to describe this was Monozukuri DNA. This refers to "a collective skill or spirit of making that inhabits the bodies of Japanese craft and technology-makers." While not inherently born with some sort of gene, this concept suggests a shared heritage of productive crafting skills that was common in Japanese manufacturing companies. In the contemporary business examples section, some companies are still investing in this concept. The historical importance, ranging from Karakuri mechanical dolls to contemporary manufacturing firms (e.g. Honda and Toyota) has led some to view Japan's manufacturing legacy as the creation of a national lineage of craftsmanship. In simpler terms, some people perceive Japan's manufacturing history as a continuous line of exceptional craftsmanship passed down over time to create a national identity. Dr. Mateja Kovacic views this concept as aligning with Nihonjinron, referring to the cultural characteristics of the meticulous crafting as uniquely Japanese. Others such as Dr. Yoshida view "monozukuri" as, "not an idea unique to Japan, and anyone who calls it as such does not understand Japanese ideas or the ideas of both East and West." Consequently, there are debates on whether this aligns as part of Nihonjinron.

In the late 20th century, Japanese manufacturing faced difficulties when dealing with globalization and economic shifts. The concept of monozukuri was used as a buzzword to revitalize the industry. The government passed the Basic Act on the Promotion of Core Manufacturing Technology in 1999, demonstrating a commitment to this concept of monozukuri.

== Basic Act on the Promotion of Core Manufacturing Technology ==
The Basic Act on the Promotion of Core Manufacturing Technology Act No. 2 was established on March 19, 1999, to support the development of the manufacturing industry. Due to changes in employment structure, industrialization overseas, and changes in the economy, the share of the manufacturing industry in Japan's GDP fell in the 1990s.

The English translation of Article 9: (Note: The full text of Article 9 in Japanese: 第九条 政府は、ものづくり基盤技術の振興に関する施策の総合的かつ計画的な推進を図るため、ものづくり基盤技術の振興に関する基本的な計画（以下この条において「ものづくり基盤技術基本計画」という。）を策定しなければならない。 ２ ものづくり基盤技術基本計画は、次の事項について定める。 一 ものづくり基盤技術の振興に関する基本的な方針 二 ものづくり基盤技術の研究開発に関する事項 三 ものづくり労働者の確保等に関する事項 四 ものづくり基盤産業の育成に関する事項 五 ものづくり基盤技術に係る学習の振興に関する事項 六 その他ものづくり基盤技術の振興に関し必要な事項)

Article 9 The government shall formulate a basic plan on the promotion of core manufacturing technology (hereinafter referred to as the "basic plan on core manufacturing technology" in this Article) in order to drive forward measures on the promotion of core manufacturing technology in a comprehensive and organized manner.

(2) The basic plan on core manufacturing technology shall provide for the following matters:
(i) Basic policy on the promotion of core manufacturing technology
(ii) Matters concerning research and development of core manufacturing technology
(iii) Matters concerning the securing of manufacturing workers and the improvement of their abilities
(iv) Matters concerning the development of the core manufacturing industry
(v) Matters concerning the promotion of learning pertaining to core manufacturing technology
(vi) Any other matter that is necessary with regard to the promotion of core manufacturing technology

== Contemporary business examples ==
Some automobile companies are still invested in this concept of "monozukuri." For instance, we can see Toyota's statement: "The origins of Toyota's Monozukuri and TPS can be traced back to Kiichiro Toyoda, the founder of Toyota Motor Corporation, and even further back to Sakichi Toyoda, the founder of the Toyota Group. Sakichi developed the handloom as a way to "help my mother, who worked hard every night weaving, and wondered if there was a way to alleviate her work a little...this later led to the development of the G-type automatic loom, the foundation of the Toyota Group."

Mitsubishi is also known to be invested in this, noting: "MHI people are what makes the spirit of Monokuzuri and the customer is central to MHI’s philosophy, and technology is shared across the numerous industries. It is not inconceivable that technology developed in its space division could find its way into an MHI air conditioning unit. This team-based approach encourages both innovation and the free flow of ideas that result in excellence in design and development. Monozukuri is a thought, a philosophy, and a principle that guides MHIAA in the way it makes air conditioners."

Sumida, a district among Tokyo's twenty-three wards, boasts a rich manufacturing history. The local authorities have implemented the "Sumida Modern Brand" initiative, which mandates that crafted goods must adhere to a continuous and connected DNA strand of monozukuri from the Edo period through the Meiji era to the present day. All of this showcases how invested these companies are in the "monozukuri DNA", which Dr. Kovacic views as a means to "impact society and the economy by re-mobilizing the Nihonjinron paradigms." In other words, this emphasizes how deeply committed these companies are to their tradition of craftsmanship.

== See also ==
- Just-in-time manufacturing
- Lean manufacturing
- Kaizen (continuous improvement)
- List of Traditional Crafts of Japan
