= Agano ware =

Type of Japanese pottery

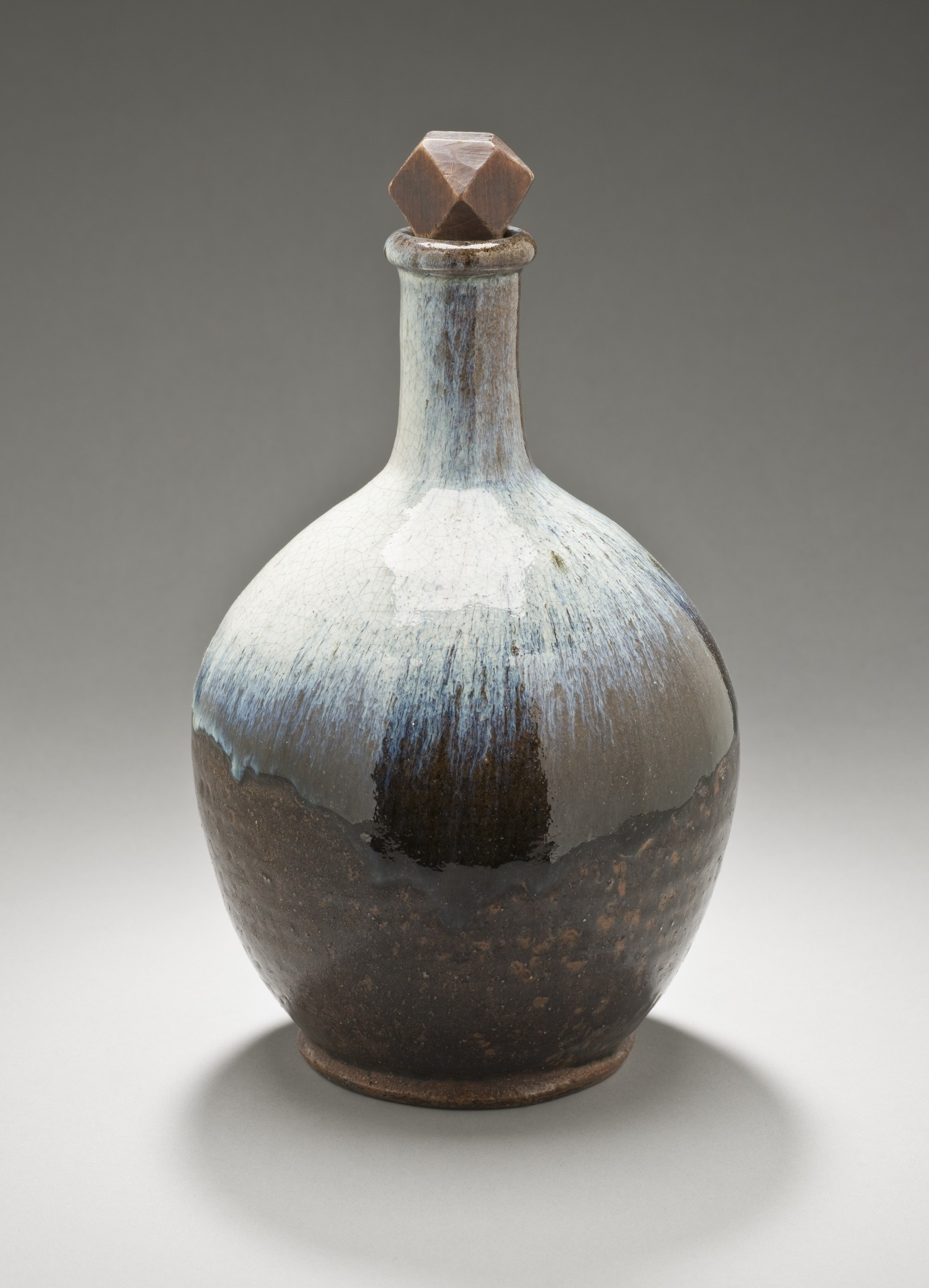
Agano ware sake bottle (tokkuri), Edo period, mid-19th century

Agano ware (上野焼, Agano-yaki) is a type of Japanese pottery traditionally made in Fukuchi, Tagawa District, Fukuoka.

== History ==
Agano ware has its beginnings in 1602, when artisans arrived in Japan from the Kingdom of Joseon in Korea by invitation from the daimyo of Kokura Domain. The beginnings of its production was supported by Hosokawa Sansai, who was otherwise known as the daimyō Hosokawa Tadaoki. It was originally associated with the tea ceremony.

Agano Kawara ware (上野香春焼) is a type of Agano ware traditionally made in Kawara, Fukuoka Prefecture.

== Images ==
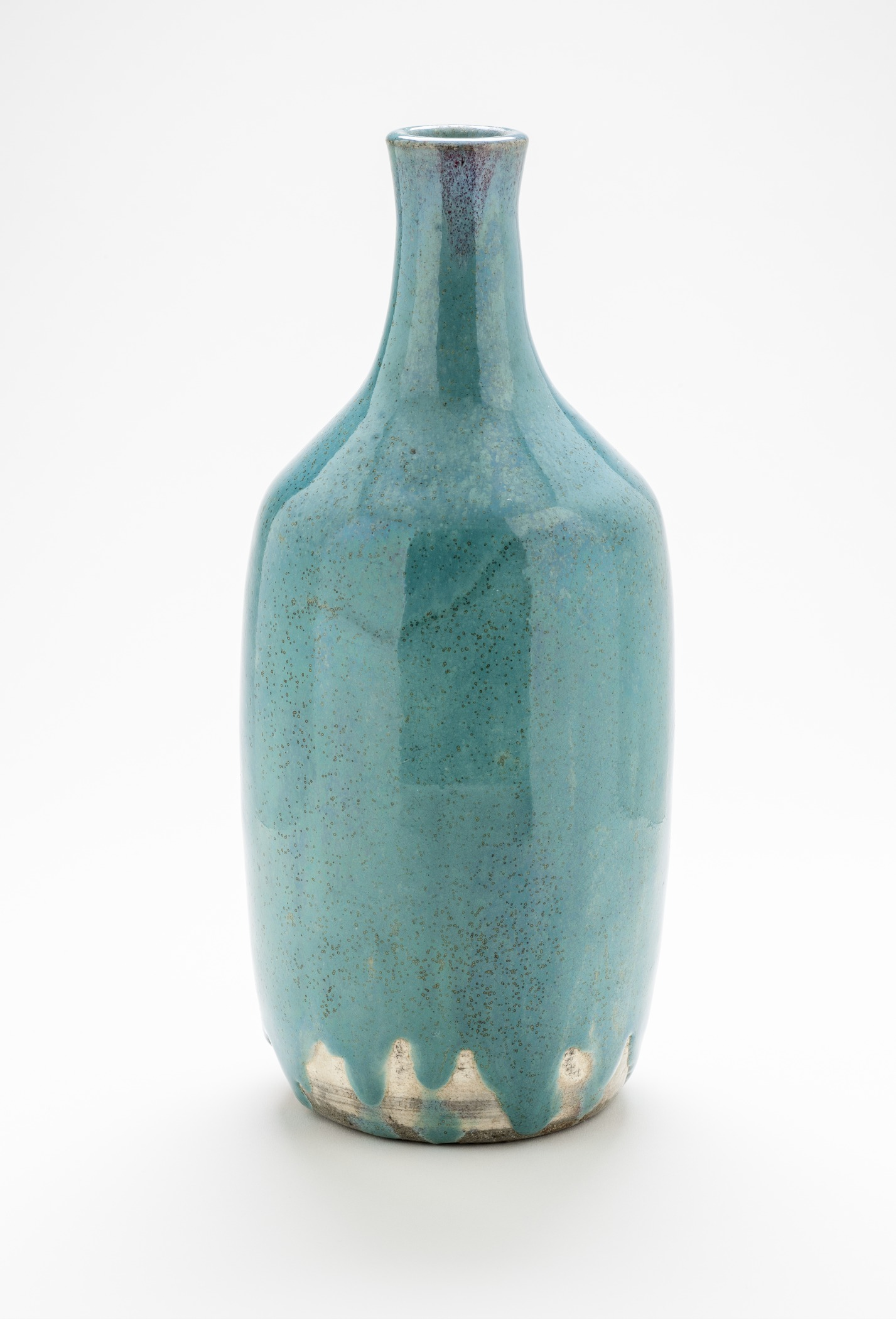
sake bottle tokkuri, Edo period, 19th century

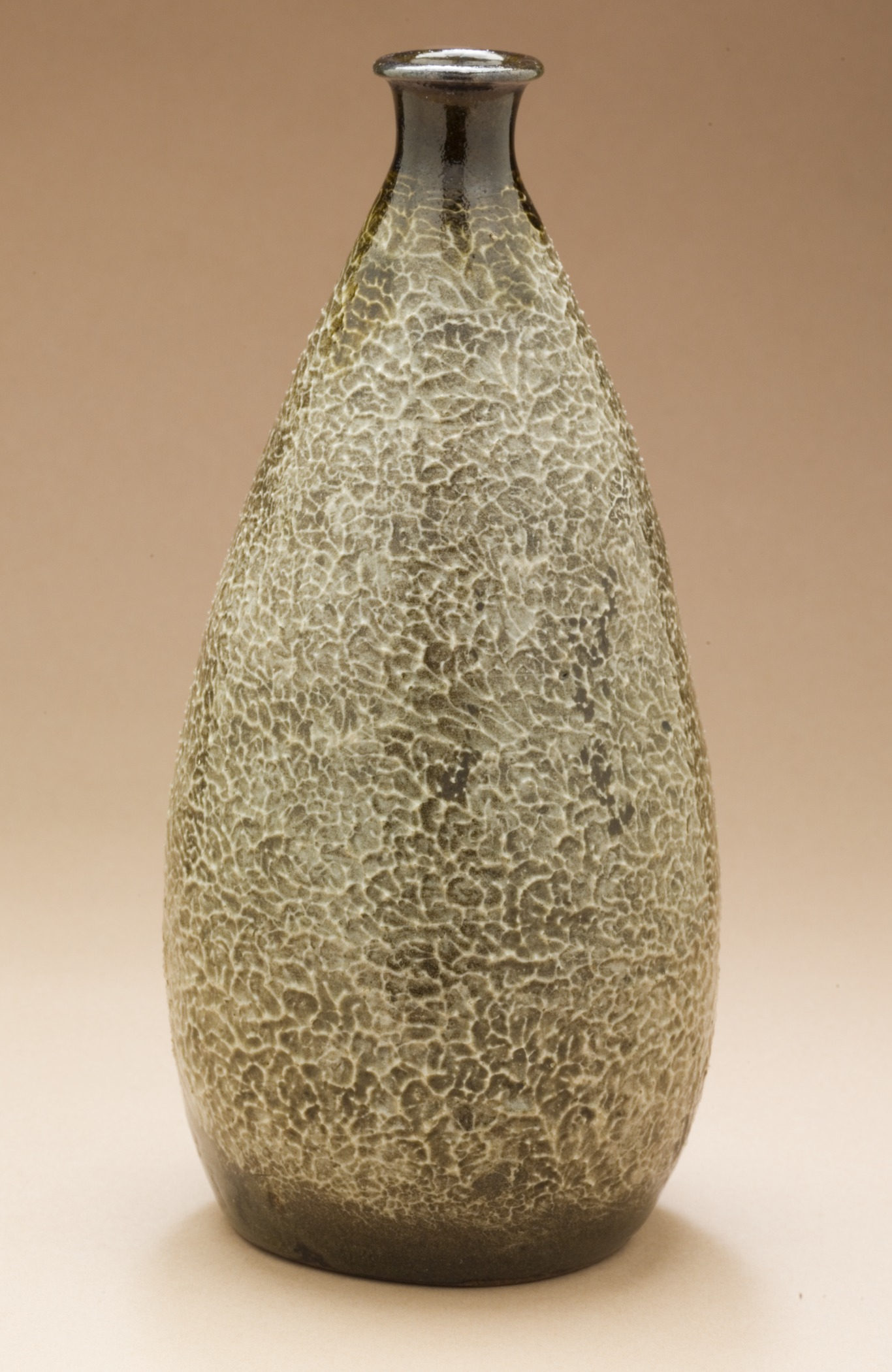
sake bottle (tokkuri) with textured surface, Edo period, late 18th-early 19th century

== See also ==
- List of Traditional Crafts of Japan
