= Edo wazao =

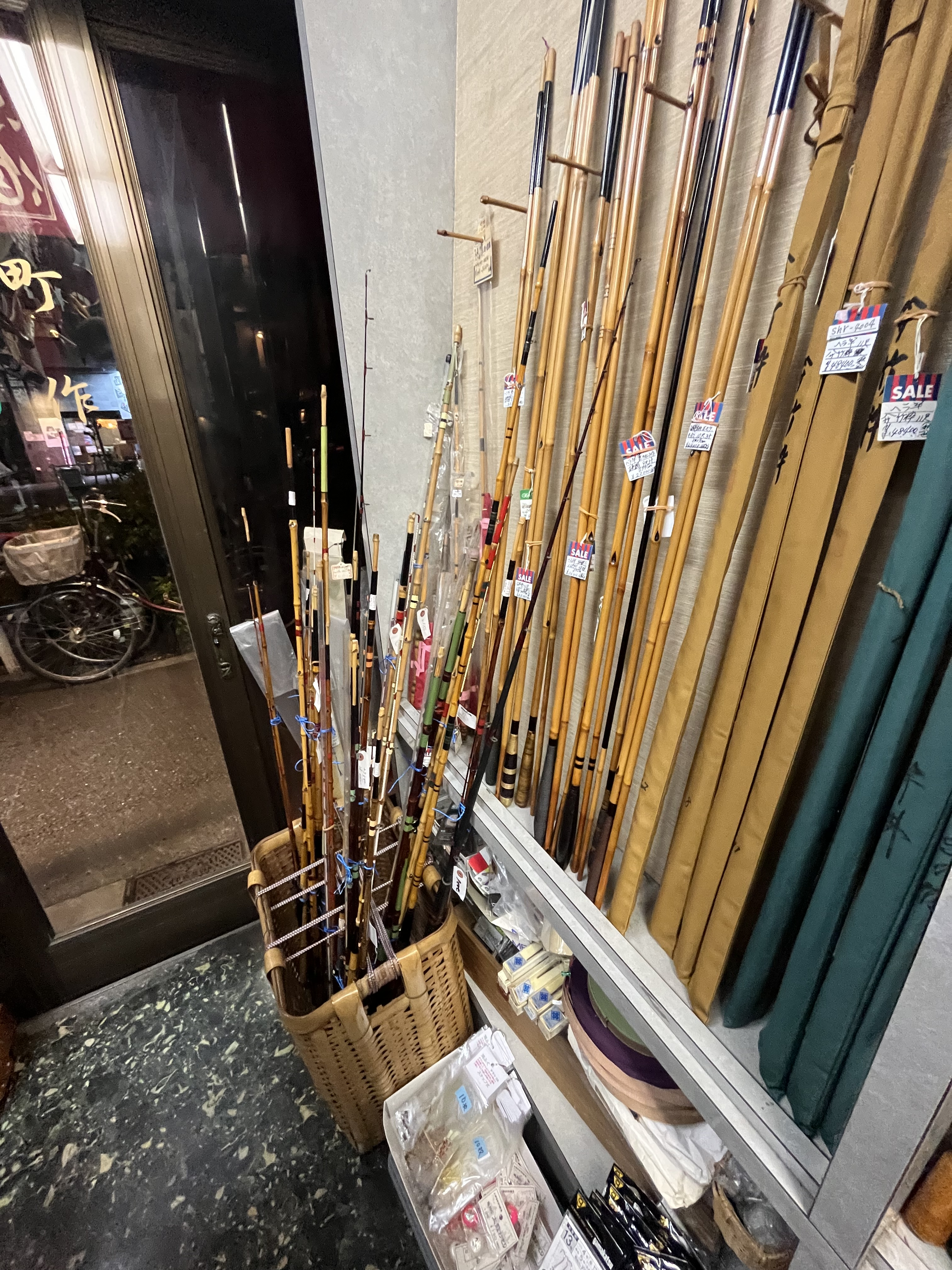
Edo wazao

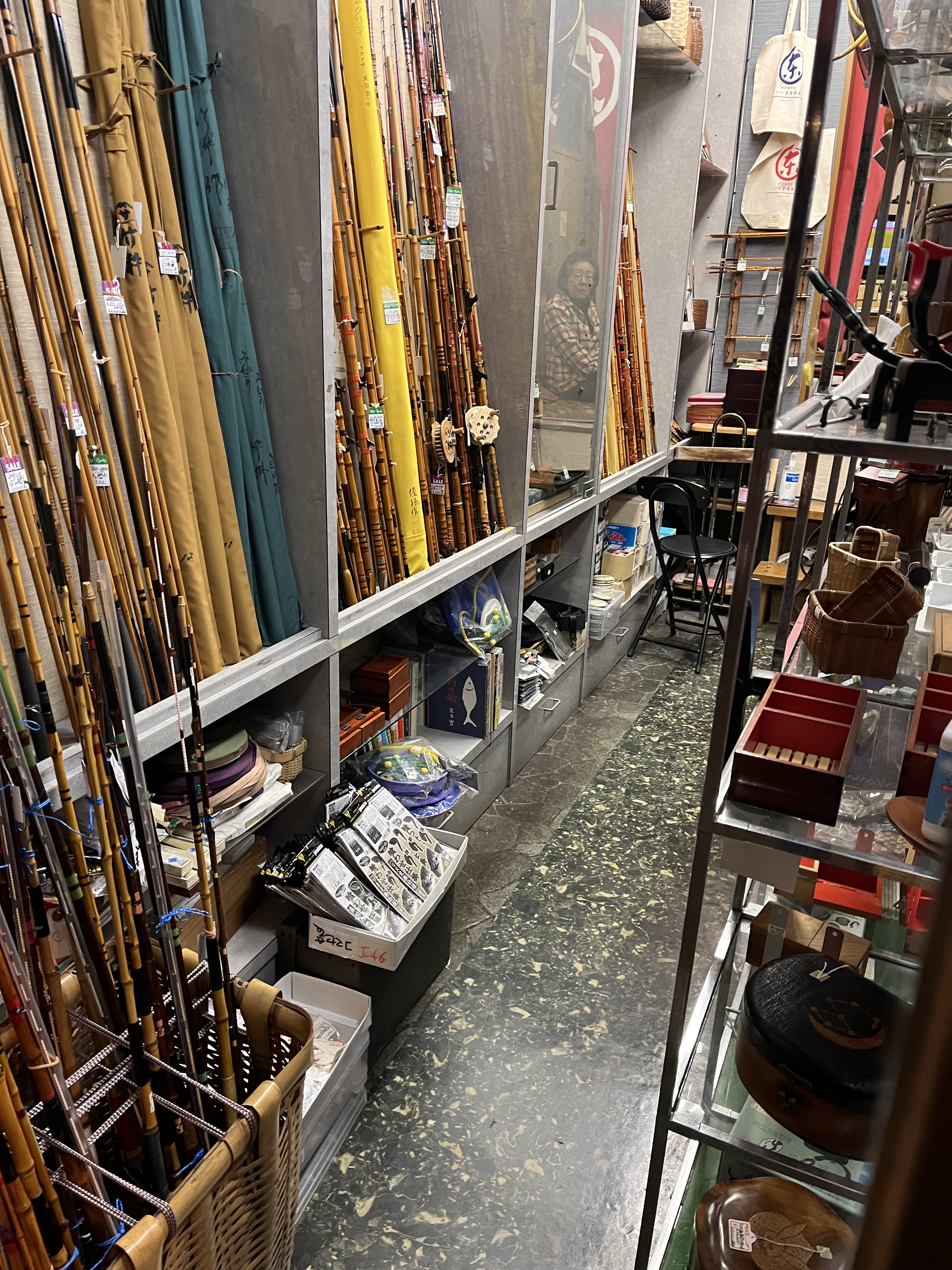
Edo wazao

Edo wazao (江戸和竿) is a style of handcrafted Japanese fishing rods that originated during the Edo period (1603–1868). These rods are predominantly made in the Kanto region, such as Tokyo and the neighboring prefectures of Chiba and Saitama, where artisans continue the traditional methods that have been passed on for generations.

Due to the position of Tokyo near the Pacific Ocean and various rivers, there was a wide array of fish. Different rods are used to catch different fish, such as tanago and wakasagi. Tanago are a carp that grown only up to 6 to 10 cm, and the smaller the catch the more highly it is regarded.

== History ==
It is said that Edo wazao was first made by a samurai named Tosaku Matsumoto in 1778. He would sell them at a temple stall in the Ueno district of Tokyo.

== Materials and construction ==
The process to construct Edo wazao fishing rods is extensive and involves over one hundred steps. The rods are primarily made from bamboo, specifically varieties such as madake, hoteitake, yadake, and hachiku. The bamboo is carefully selected and aged to achieve the desired flexibility and strength for different fish, conditions, and techniques. Artisans often use bamboo with distinct textures and color variations, which contribute to the rod's aesthetic appeal. The rod is constructed in segments that are joined by intricate fittings, allowing it to be disassembled and easily transported.

The crafting process involves multiple stages, including:

- Selection and drying of bamboo: Bamboo is dried to remove moisture. This curing process can take several years to achieve optimal quality.
- Shaping and Assembly: Each rod segment is shaped and smoothed to the desired structure. Artisans often combine different bamboo types within a single rod to vary flexibility and strength. This process is known as kirikumi and is regarded as the most crucial step.
- Heating: In a process known as hiire, the rods are heated to remove oils and strengthen them.
- Joinery: The segments are joined using precision so that the rod does not rattle and has good flexibility.
- Lacquer and Ornamentation: Traditional Japanese lacquer, often infused with natural pigments, is applied to protect the rod and enhance its appearance.
