= Bambooworking =

Culture of making bamboo-based items

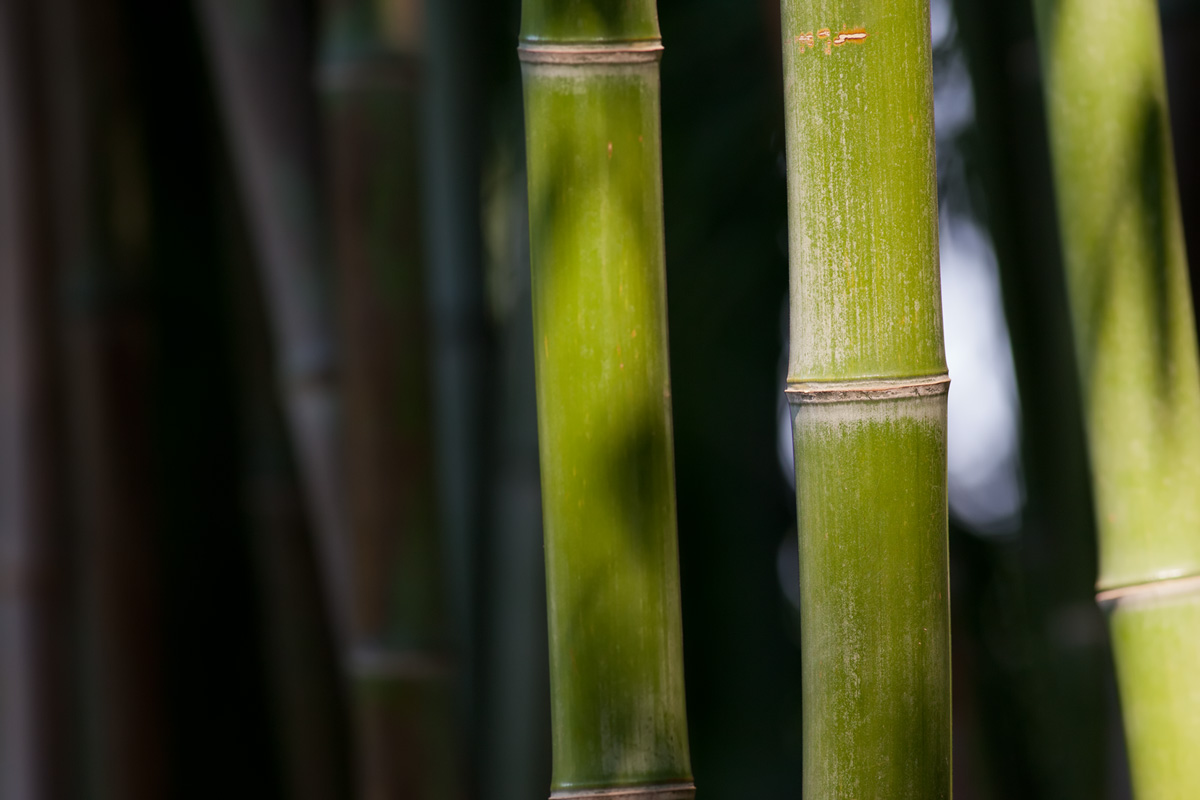
Bamboo

Bambooworking is the activity or skill of making items from bamboo, and includes architecture, carpentry, furniture and cabinetry, carving, joinery, and weaving. Its historical roots in Asia span cultures, civilizations, and millennia, and is found across East, South, and Southeast Asia.

== Functional uses ==
=== Writing surface ===
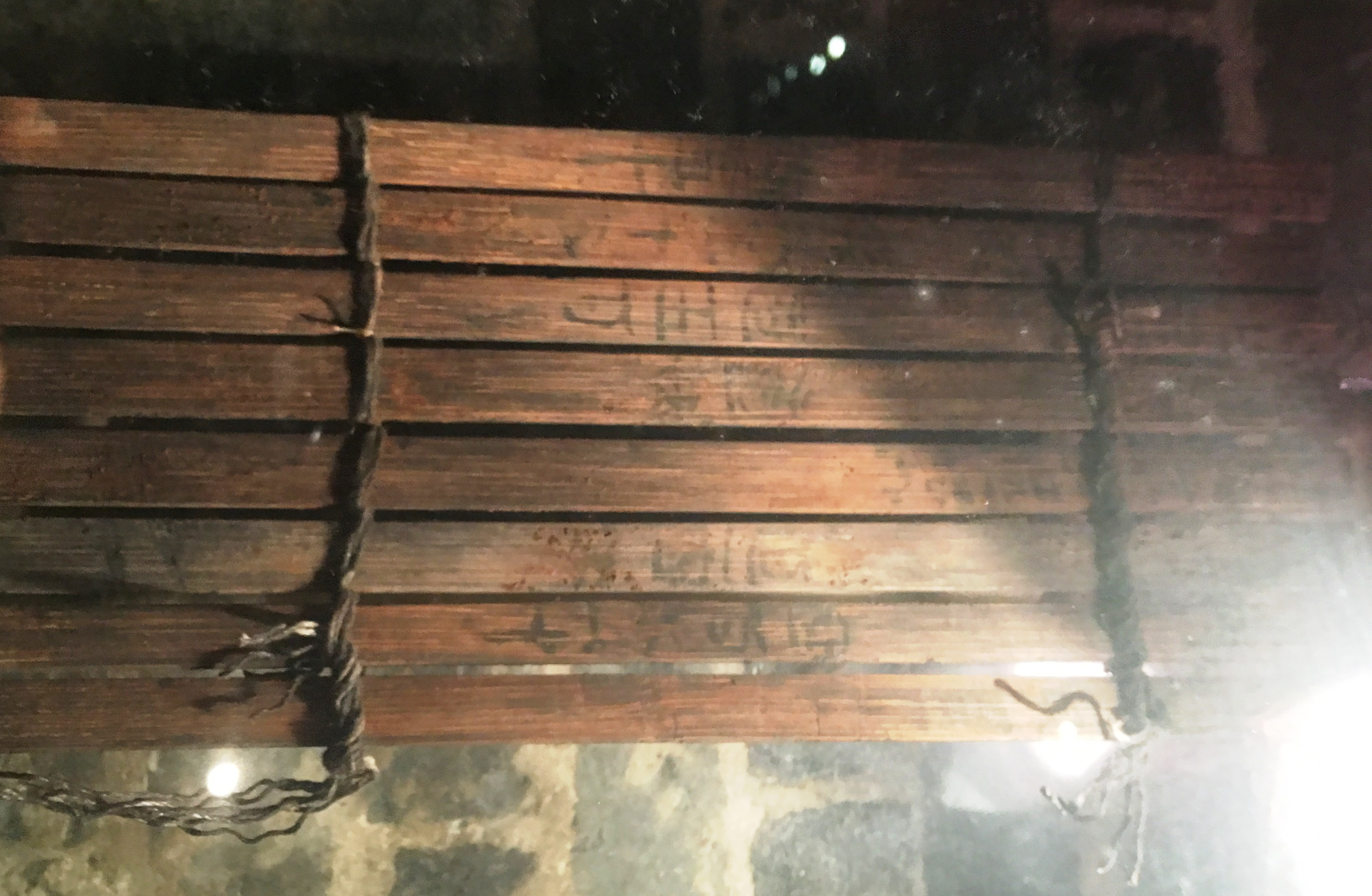
Bamboo slip, Qin Dynasty

Bamboo was in widespread use in early China as a medium for written documents. The earliest surviving examples of such documents, written in ink on string-bound bundles of bamboo strips (or "slips"), date from the fifth century BC, during the Warring States period. References in earlier texts surviving on other media indicate some precursor of these Warring States period bamboo slips was used as early as the late Shang period (from about 1250 BC).

Bamboo or wooden strips were used as the standard writing material during the early Han dynasty, and excavated examples have been found in abundance. Subsequently, paper began to displace bamboo and wooden strips from mainstream uses, and by the fourth century AD, bamboo slips had been largely abandoned as a medium for writing in China.

Bamboo fiber has been used to make paper in China since early times. A high-quality, handmade bamboo paper is still produced in small quantities. Coarse bamboo paper is still used to make spirit money in many Chinese communities.

Bamboo pulps are mainly produced in China, Myanmar, Thailand, and India, and are used in printing and writing papers. Several paper industries are surviving on bamboo forests. Ballarpur (Chandrapur, Maharstra) paper mills use bamboo for paper production. The most common bamboo species used for paper are Dendrocalamus asper and Bambusa blumeana. It is also possible to make dissolving pulp from bamboo. The average fiber length is similar to hardwoods, but the properties of bamboo pulp are closer to softwood pulps due to it having a very broad fiber length distribution. With the help of molecular tools, it is now possible to distinguish the superior fiber-yielding species/varieties even at juvenile stages of their growth, which can help in unadulterated merchandise production.

In Central India, there are regular bamboo working circles in the forest areas of Maharashtra, Madhyapradesh, Odisha, and Chhattisgarh. Most of the bamboo is harvested for papermaking. Bamboo is cut after three years of its germination. No cutting is done during the rainy season (July–September); broken and malformed culms are harvested first.

=== Writing pen ===
In olden times, people in India used handmade pens (known as Kalam or boru (बोरू)) made from thin bamboo sticks (with diameters of 5–10 mm and lengths of 100–150 mm) by simply peeling them on one side and making a nib-like pattern at the end. The pen would then be dipped in ink for writing.

=== Textiles ===
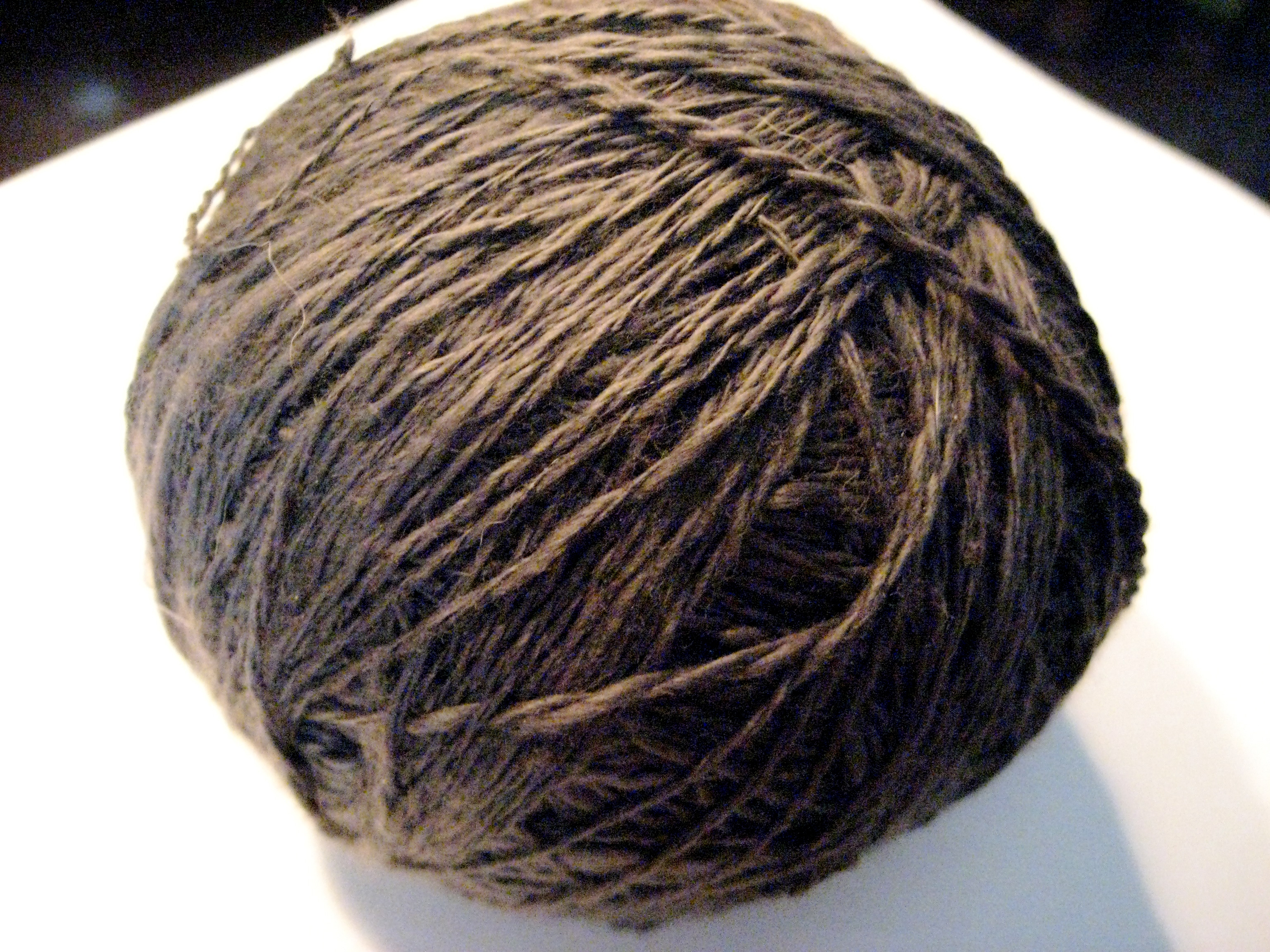
Handspun carbonized bamboo fiber

Since the fibers of bamboo are very short (less than 3 mm or ^{1}/_{8} in), they are not usually transformed into yarn by a natural process. The usual process by which textiles labeled as being made of bamboo are produced uses only rayon made from the fibers, with heavy employment of chemicals. To accomplish this, the fibers are broken down with chemicals and extruded through mechanical spinnerets; the chemicals include lye, carbon disulfide, and strong acids. Retailers have sold both end products as "bamboo fabric" to cash in on bamboo's current ecofriendly cachet. The Canadian Competition Bureau and the US Federal Trade Commission, as of mid-2009, are cracking down on the practice of labeling bamboo rayon as natural bamboo fabric. Under the guidelines of both agencies, these products must be labeled as rayon, with the optional qualifier "from bamboo".

==== Fabric ====
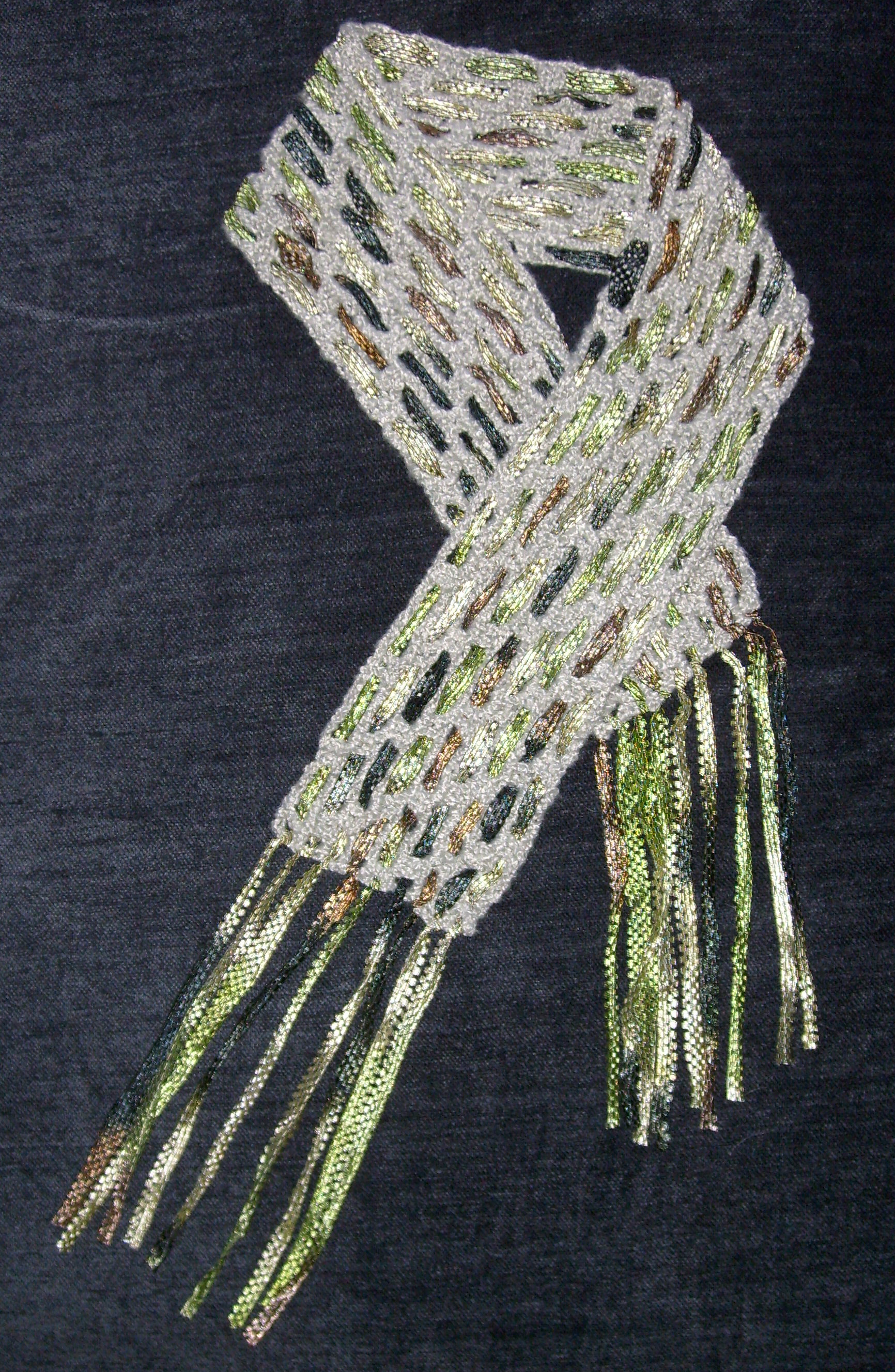
A scarf made of bamboo yarn and synthetic ribbon

Bamboo textile is any cloth, yarn or clothing made from bamboo fibres.

Modern textiles which claim to be made from bamboo are usually made from viscose rayon instead, a regenerated cellulose fibre using wood pulp as its raw material. Many jurisdictions prohibit labeling such products as bamboo unless they contain actual bamboo fiber. This process removes the natural characteristics of the raw material, rendering it identical to rayon from other cellulose sources.

=== Basketry ===
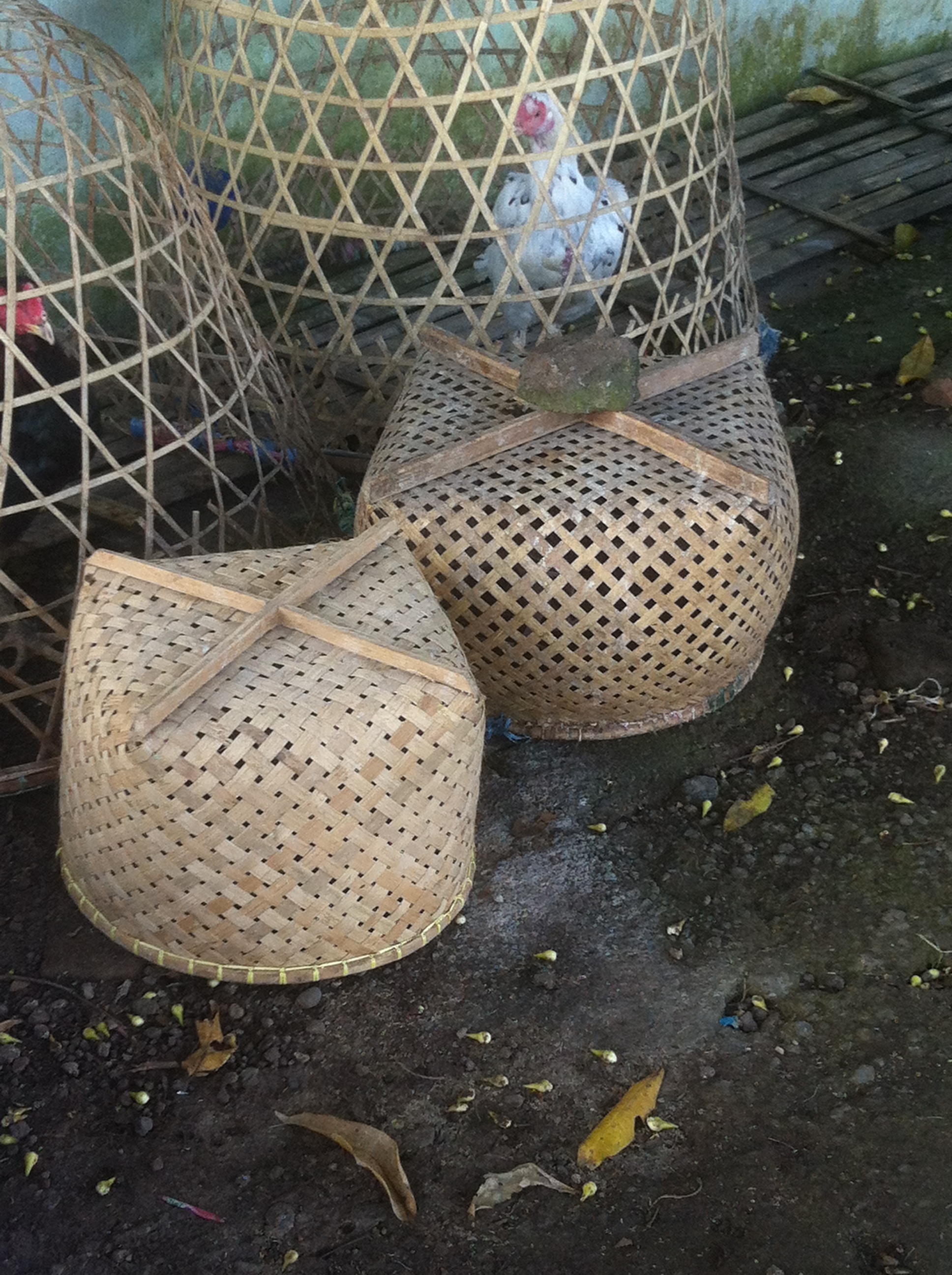
Bamboo baskets

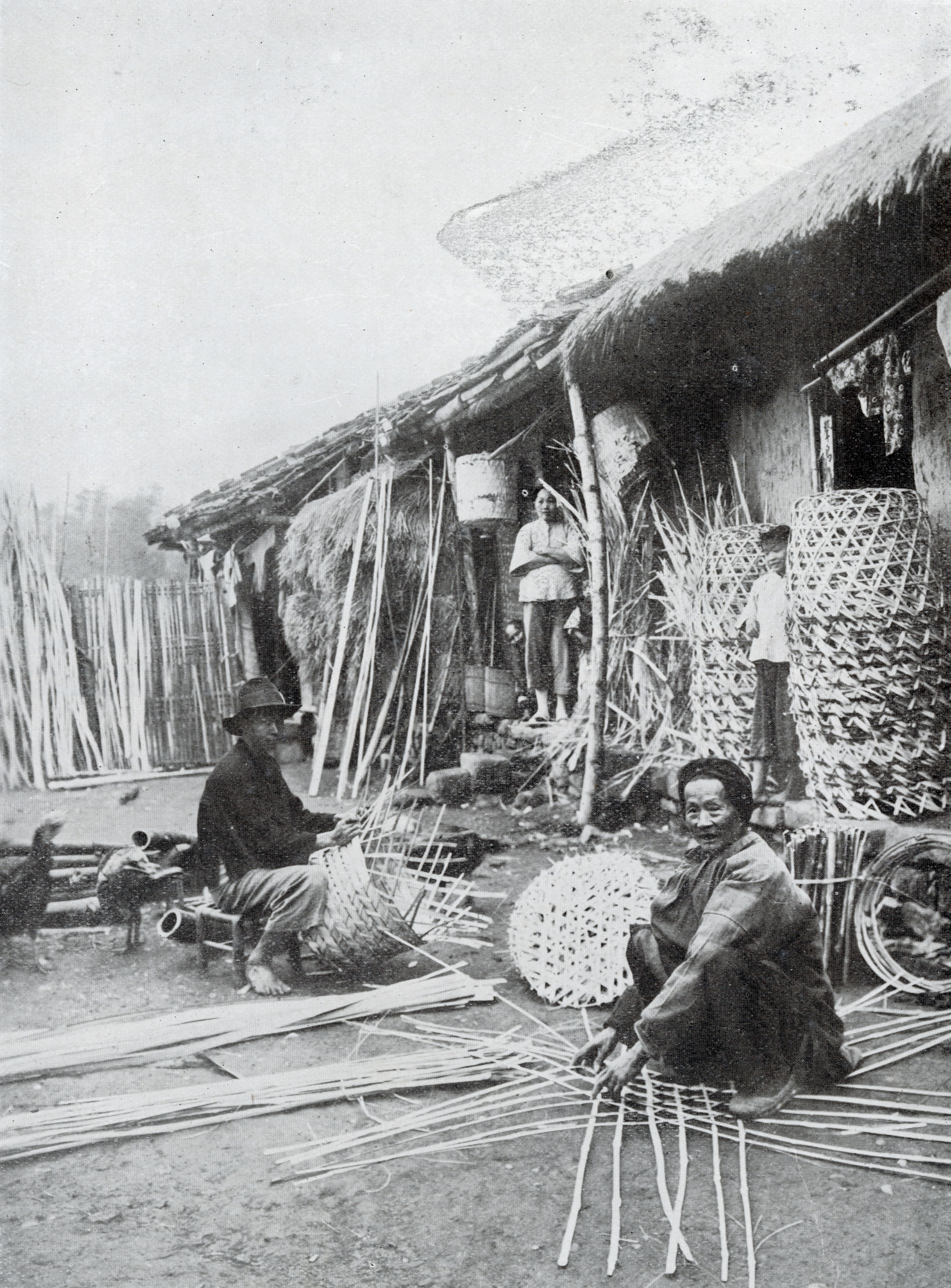
Weaving bamboo baskets for oranges, ca.1930

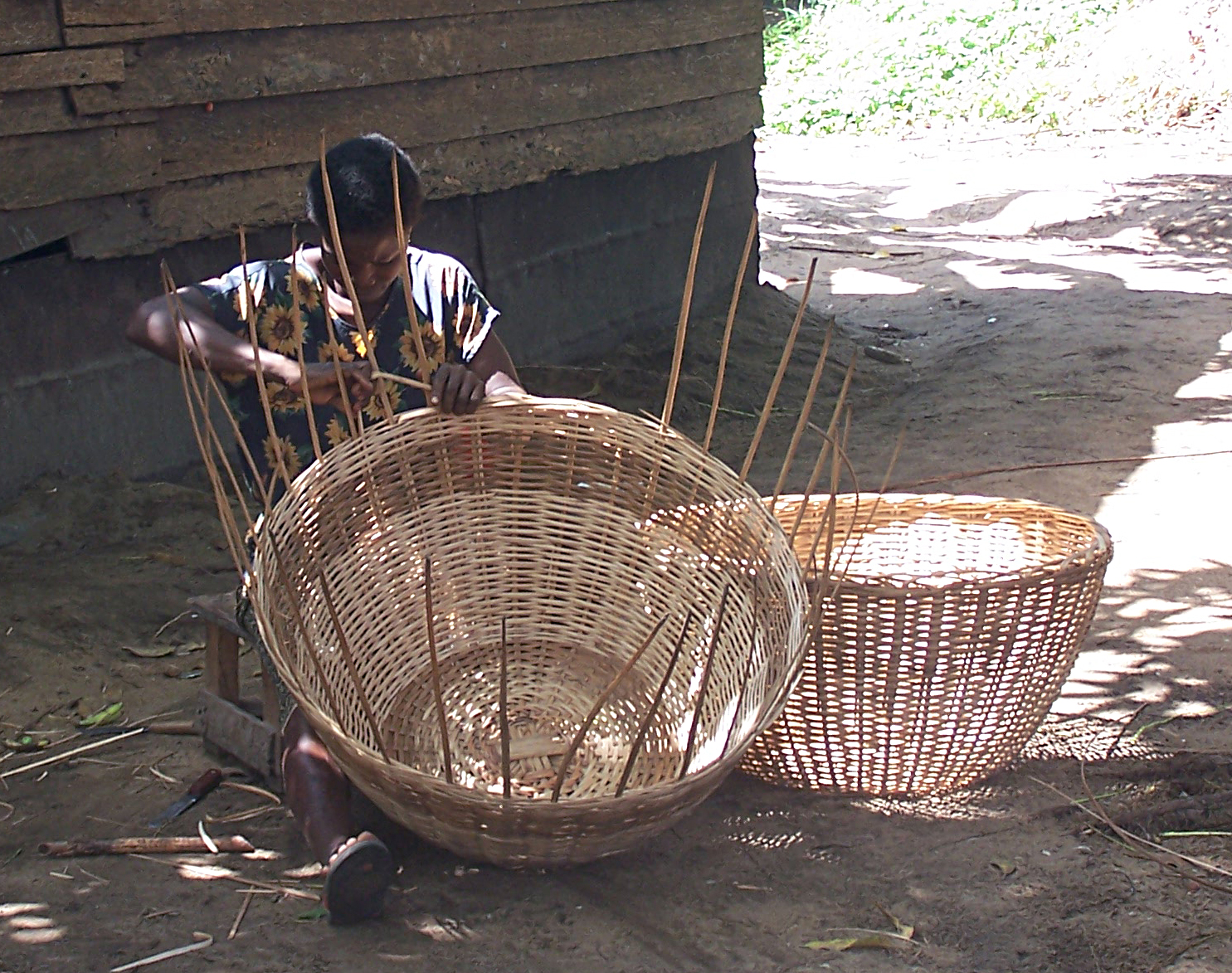
A woman weaves a basket in Cameroon

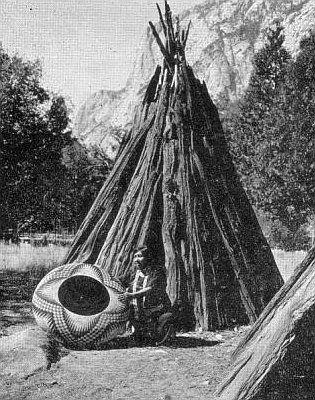
Artist Lucy Telles and large basket, in Yosemite National Park, 1933

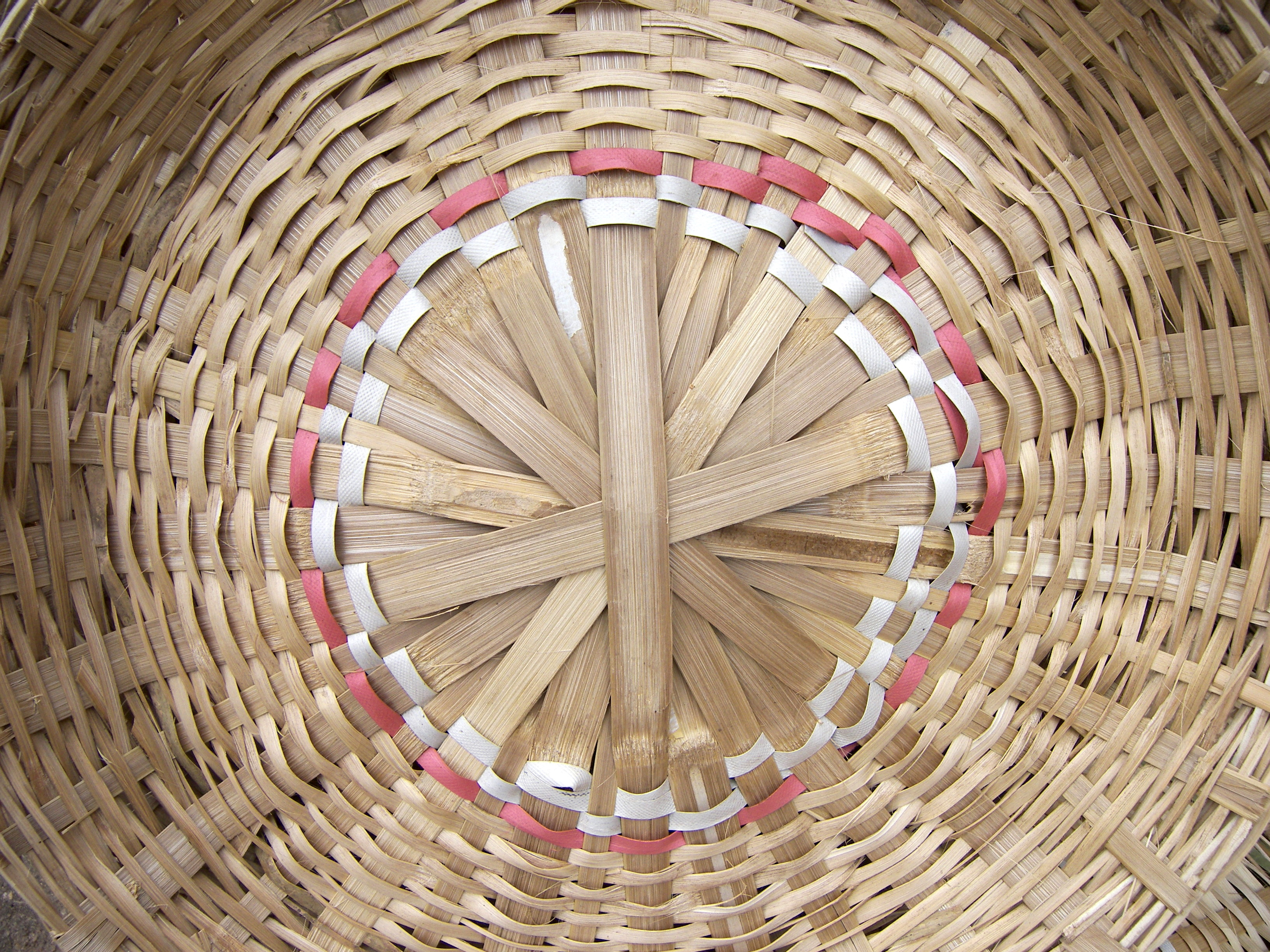
Woven bamboo basket for sale in K. R. Market, Bangalore, India

Basket weaving (also basketry or basket making) is the process of weaving or sewing pliable materials into objects, such as baskets, mats, mesh bags or even furniture. Craftspeople and artists specialized in making baskets may be known as basket makers and basket weavers. Basket weaving is also a rural craft. It is also widely known in Middle Eastern regions such as Cyprus.

Basketry is made from a variety of fibrous or pliable materials—anything that will bend and form a shape. Examples include pine, straw, willow (esp. osier), oak, wisteria, forsythia, vines, stems, fur, hide, grasses, thread, and fine wooden splints. There are many applications for basketry, from simple mats to hot air balloon gondolas.

Many Indigenous peoples are renowned for their basket-weaving techniques.

=== Construction ===
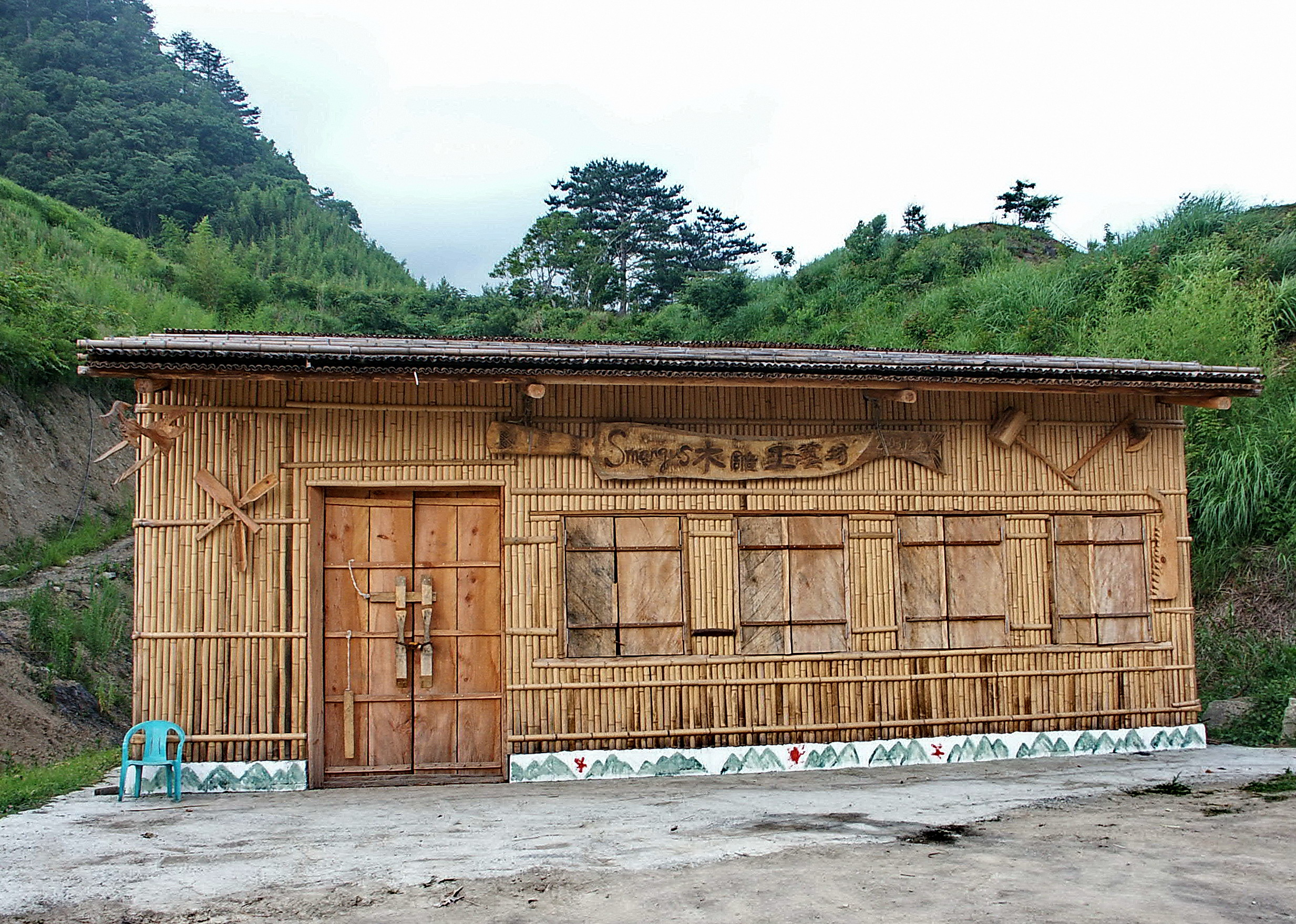
Smangus Woodcarving Studio

Bamboo, like true wood, is a natural building material with a high strength-to-weight ratio useful for structures. In its natural form, bamboo as a construction material is traditionally associated with the cultures of South Asia, East Asia, and the South Pacific, to some extent in Central and South America, and by extension, in the aesthetic of Tiki culture.

In China and India, bamboo was used to hold up simple suspension bridges, either by making cables of split bamboo or twisting whole culms of sufficiently pliable bamboo together. One such bridge in the area of Qian-Xian is referenced in writings dating back to 960 AD and may have stood since as far back as the third century BC, due largely to continuous maintenance.

Bamboo has also long been used as scaffolding; the practice has been banned in China for buildings over six stories, but is still in continuous use for skyscrapers in Hong Kong. A modern resort guesthouse in Palawan, Philippines, with traditional woven bamboo walls (sawali)

In the Philippines, the nipa hut is a fairly typical example of the most basic sort of housing where bamboo is used. The walls are split and woven bamboo, and bamboo slats and poles may be used as its support.

In Japanese architecture, bamboo is used primarily as a supplemental or decorative element in buildings, such as fencing, fountains, grates, and gutters, largely due to the ready abundance of quality timber.

Many ethnic groups in remote areas that have water access in Asia use bamboo that is 3–5 years old to make rafts. They use 8 to 12 poles, 6–7 m (20–23 ft) long, laid together side by side to a width of about 1 m (3 ft). Once the poles are lined up together, they cut a hole crosswise through the poles at each end and use a small bamboo pole pushed through that hole like a screw to hold all the long bamboo poles together. Floating houses use whole bamboo stalks tied together in a big bunch to support the house floating in the water.

=== Fishing and aquaculture ===
Bamboo is extensively used for fishing and aquaculture applications on the Dayu Bay in Cangnan County, Zhejiang

Bamboo trays used in mussel farming (Abucay, Bataan, Philippines)

Due to its flexibility, bamboo is also used to make fishing rods. The split cane rod is especially prized for fly fishing.

=== Firecrackers ===
Bamboo has been traditionally used in Malaysia as a firecracker called a meriam buluh or bamboo cannon. Four-foot-long sections of bamboo are cut, and a mixture of water and calcium carbide are introduced. The resulting acetylene gas is ignited with a stick, producing a loud bang.

=== Weapons ===
Bamboo has often been used to construct weapons and is still incorporated in several Asian martial arts.

- A bamboo staff, sometimes with one end sharpened, is used in the Tamil martial art of silambam, a word derived from a term meaning "hill bamboo".
- Staves used in the Indian martial art of gatka are commonly made from bamboo, a material favoured for its light weight.
- A bamboo sword called a shinai is used in the Japanese martial art of kendo.
- Bamboo is used for crafting the bows, called yumi, and arrows used in the Japanese martial art kyūdō.
- The first gunpowder-based weapons, such as the fire lance, were made of bamboo.
- Sharpened bamboo javelins weighted with sand known as bagakay were used as disposable missile weapons in both land and naval warfare in the Philippines. They were thrown in groups at a time at enemy ships or massed enemy formations. Non-disposable finely crafted throwing spears made from bamboo weighted with sand known as sugob were also used. Sugob were mainly used for close-quarters combat and were only thrown when they could be retrieved.
- Metal-tipped blowgun-spears called sumpit (or sumpitan), used by various ethnic groups in the islands of the Philippines, Borneo, and Sulawesi, were generally made from hollowed bamboo. They used thick short darts dipped in the concentrated sap of Antiaris toxicaria, which could cause lethal cardiac arrest.

=== Desalination ===
Bamboo can be used in water desalination. A bamboo filter is used to remove the salt from seawater.

=== Indicator of climate change ===
The Song dynasty (960–1279 AD) Chinese scientist and polymath Shen Kuo (1031–1095) used the evidence of underground petrified bamboo found in the dry northern climate of Yan'an, Shanbei region, Shaanxi province, to support his geological theory of gradual climate change.

== Aesthetic uses ==
Bamboo carving, which originated in the Jiangnan region of China and developed into a specialized art form in the middle of the Ming Dynasty, is the process of designing and creating motifs on the surface or root of bamboo using a variety of knife techniques. As a unique material craft, bamboo carving is a representation of elite Chinese literati culture. On the desks of the ancient Han literati, the implements created using bamboo carving skills are known as the stationery. The literati frequently wrote poetry to laud the fine aesthetic appearance of bamboo-carved stationery and the splendor of the embellished themes despite the fact that they were useful products, highlighting the particular cultural significance of bamboo. As a sort of visual narrative, bamboo-carved stationery depict landscape elements within a specific spatial context. The Han cultural and artistic consciousness is embodied in this process. Bamboo cutting is still regarded in Chinese arts and crafts as a material cultural icon.

=== Origin and history ===
The oldest known bamboo carving technique identified to date is the three animal-footed bamboo symbol (san shou zu zhu wen diao), which was found during the Western Zhou Dynasty (771-1046 BCE) excavation of a Chu tomb. This bamboo carving tool features straightforward creative patterns.

Initially, bamboo was just used for its value as a material for writing or carving straightforward designs. But over time, it evolved into a specific craft within the decorative arts category.

Bamboo-carved stationery products acquired stunning decorative elements as their focus switched from one of craftsmanship to one of art. Thanks to their abundance of creative ideas and carving abilities, bamboo-carving craftsmen evolved from being artisans to being bamboo-carving artists. There are many various kinds of carved bamboo stationery, including brush-pots, pens, paperweights, water containers, armrests, and more. The literati regularly used these items as stationery.

The range of forms and subjects employed demonstrates the attraction of bamboo carving, which dates back to the middle of the Ming era. Both as useful tools and pieces of art, the carvings on the bamboo stationery used by the middle Ming and early Qing literati are valuable.

Throughout the middle of the Ming and Qing Dynasties, bamboo carvings underwent a transition from functional instruments to decorative stationery. During this time, numerous genres emerged, including the Jiading and Jinling genres in Shanghai and Nanjing, respectively. Zhu He, the inventor of the Jiading style of bamboo carving, employed a variety of knife techniques, for instance, to represent his imagined three-dimensional craft motif in actual space and imitate the styles of other painters. He carved the motif in the bamboo, imitating the brushstrokes with a knife. Additionally, he imitated the artwork's design. Creative bamboo cutting methods transform flat paintings into three-dimensional space sculptures.

Bamboo cutting quickly developed from a traditional craft to a form of fine art that the Chinese royal family admired. Bamboo carving evolved from a folk craft item used by the common people to a court item, because of the emperor's taste in art and his belief in Confucian culture. The Han culture must, therefore, satisfy the senses of bamboo carving because other civilizations can contribute the same senses. In the first year of Yongzheng (1723), the emperor ordered the building of a workshop (zao ban chu) to make products for his home, staffed with artists and artisans he cherished. Feng Xilu, a master of bamboo carving, was invited to the palace to create items out of the material, and this phenomenon made it possible for bamboo carving and painting to interact more frequently, further elevating bamboo carving's artistic status

=== Chinese literati and cultural phenomenon ===
The bamboo sculptures' landscape motif reflects the literati's spiritual quest for idea-image. The social structure evolved and the south became the region's economic center in the 18th century. The numerous craftspeople, painters, and intellectuals who congregated in the Jiangnan region started to communicate often, which influenced the change from painting to craft. The connection between the paintings and the carving implements used during this time is the literati's spiritual quest.

Literati artists looked for Taoism in nature in the early Ming Dynasty (1368–1435), while later painters used idea-image to communicate Confucianism. The proverb "The wise man enjoys water, and the benevolent man enjoys mountains" (Zhi zhe le shan, ren zhe le shui) is said to be true. The literati started to seek idea-imagery as an escape from reality. As the free individual consciousness ranged from landscape painting to the landscape motif in bamboo carving, this was the start of the literati's and the painter's individual will becoming embodied. The intricate spatial ideology of the literate is expressed in the aesthetic perception of landscape space. The value of bamboo-carved stationery has increased due to the literati's shifting identities.

During the political turmoil of China's mid-Ming dynasty, the literati were not only suppressed by the imperial powers but also suffered a change in status, as the distinction between literati, merchants, and craftsmen started to blur. During this time, the literary elite started obsessively collecting artifacts as a way to escape from reality and started comparing themselves more frequently to the bamboo culture. The ancient Chinese regarded bamboo as having unique spiritual importance, and Shuowen Jiezias characterized it as "a winter-born grass... All the characters with bamboo belong to the scope of bamboo".

In Chinese characters, bamboo is widely employed as a radical, and the literati composed numerous poems praising it. Literati composed numerous poems praising bamboo and comparing it to a gentleman, because bamboo is widely employed as a radical in Chinese characters. "Bamboo is like a kind person, why is that?" asks Chinese poet Bai Juyi in his poem "The Story of Raising Bamboo" (Yang zhu ji). Bamboo gradually gained popularity among elite writers during the Ming and Qing eras and was known as bamboo-carved stationery.

Although the literati also used writing implements made of other materials, there were more than a dozen different types of bamboo-only writing implements in use during the Ming and Qing dynasties. Numerous bamboo-carved stationery items have survived to the present day, demonstrating the literati's widespread and popular use of this material at the time. These physical and spiritual attributes may be the reason why bamboo-carved stationery was so well received by intellectuals and artists of bamboo carving in the middle Ming and Qing dynasties.

In addition to carving themes, bamboo carvers like Zhou Hao and Cai Zhao started to develop their own aesthetic literacy and cultural accomplishment at the same time. Zhou Hao masterfully grafted the painting effects and techniques of the Nan zong genre and Bei zong genre landscape theme onto sculptures. Additionally, the literati and bamboo carvers started working together. A prime example was the connection between bamboo carver Cai Zhao and painter Ren Xiong. Ren Xiong, a native of the province of Xiaoshan, was an accomplished landscape and figure painter with a graceful and endearing aesthetic. Cai Zhao, meanwhile, was skilled in carving seals, knowledgeable about identifying ancient gold and stone inscriptions, and skilled in carving bamboo. He was skilled in carving bamboo and wood.

Zhao and Xiong spared no effort when working together to produce art, with the former carving the painting that Xiong had painted on the bamboo. For the bamboo carving on the stationery, they employed a method known as the embossed technique (fu diao), which made the image appear uncontrolled. Cai Zhao's knifework is both soft and strong, leaving no unnecessary trace of the blade on the surface. This piece of art illustrates the social and cultural interactions between writers, painters, and bamboo carvers throughout this time. The Han bamboo culture's symbolic significance and the literati's desire to explore their spiritual yearning for outdoor scenery led to the copying of landscape painting in bamboo carving motif. The landscape motifs of both bamboo carving and landscape painting share a very comparable spiritual quest.

=== Decline ===
Due to the influence of Chinese social and political culture, bamboo carvings' identities have undergone enormous alterations throughout the 20th century. It has evolved from useful office supplies to intangible cultural heritage. On the one hand, bamboo carving is no longer able to satisfy the aesthetic requirements of mass marketization due to this loss in character. On the other hand, in order to adhere to the market model of mass manufacturing, bamboo cutting techniques are getting worse and worse. This condition is what caused bamboo carving to be disjointed in the 20th century. In fact, the Han literati culture is thought to include the pictorial carving method used in bamboo cutting. Although ancient bamboo carving is primarily the work of literati, it has gradually gained acceptance as a form of material cultural artwork and is now used by the general public. As such, bamboo carving should preserve its own distinctive spiritual and cultural legacy, continually innovate and modify bamboo carving techniques, and replicate the resurgence of bamboo carving art.

==== Protection and inheritance of Chinese bamboo craft ====
Bamboo craft, a traditional Chinese handcraft with a long history and excellent craftsmanship, is a significant component of traditional folk art. The southern provinces of China are known for their bamboo crafts, with Sichuan, Zhejiang, Jiangxi, Fujian, and Hubei province being the most well-known. Bamboo craft can be split into two groups based on the many methods used to carry out and express artistic endeavors: weaving and carving, each of which has distinctive national and regional artistic features. But as economic society develops quickly and Western dominant culture spreads, many traditional handicrafts are gradually losing popularity. Many traditional techniques have been included in the list of "intangible cultural heritage" at the national, provincial, city, and county levels as a result of the thorough development of this protection, and the policy of "protection-oriented, rescue first, rational use, inheritance, and development" has been established. The ancient artistry of bamboo, which is directly linked to human production and daily life, has therefore attracted a lot of interest. For instance, the "intangible cultural heritage" protection list includes bamboo crafts such Zhangshuiquan weaving from bamboo in Wuxue, Hubei Province, Xiaoyu craft from bamboo in Yiyang, Hunan Province, Liuqing carving from bamboo in Changzhou, and porcelain bamboo craft from bamboo in Sichuan. On the one hand, bamboo goods that are part of the "intangible cultural heritage" must continue to innovate using traditional handcraft techniques. However, the key to safeguarding bamboo art and ensuring its heirloom status as well as development is to draw inspiration from traditional bamboo techniques, find a point of convergence with the design of contemporary bamboo products, and meet the aesthetic needs of modern people.
