= Kabazaiku =

Traditional Japanese woodworking craft

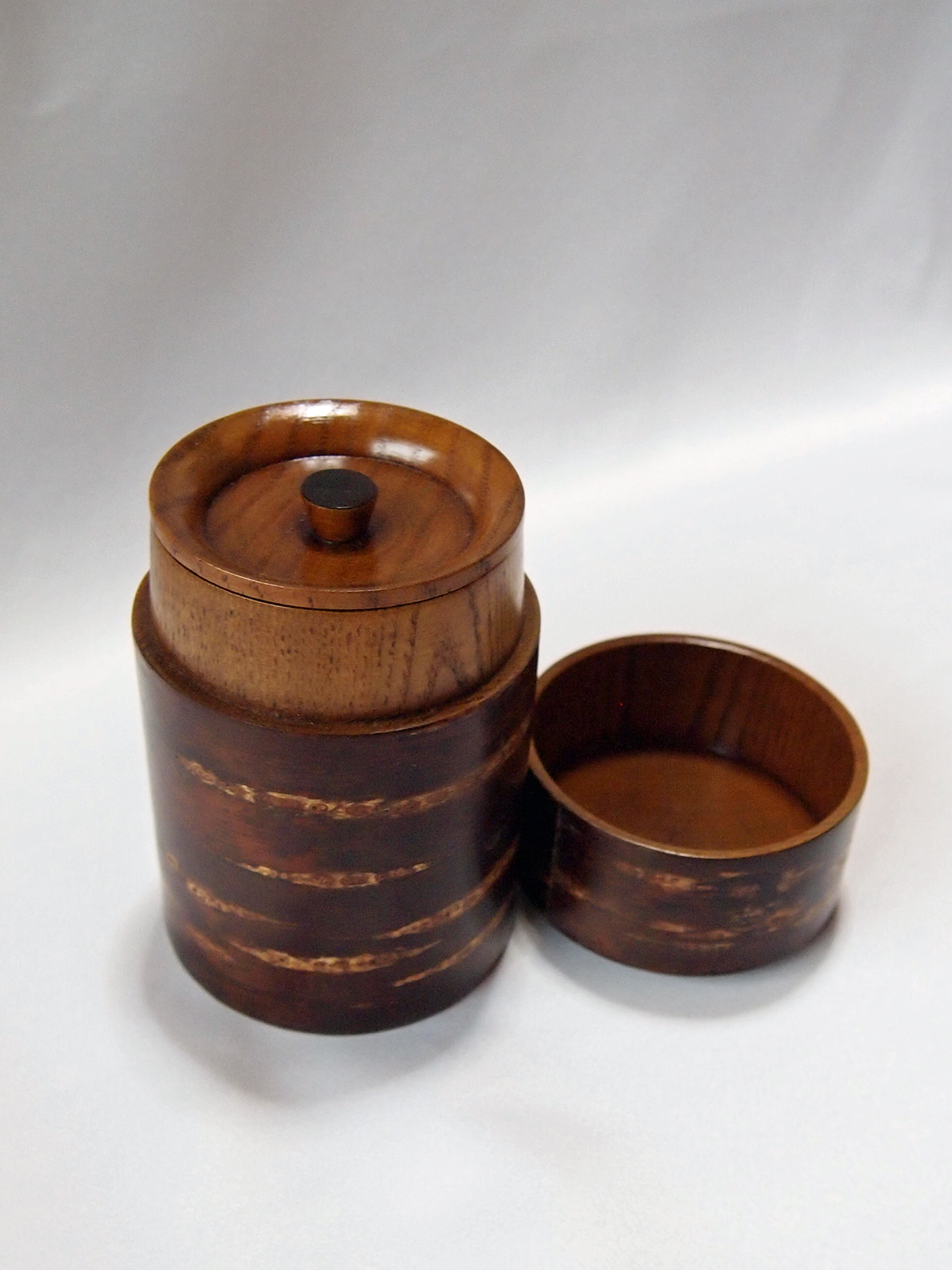
tea caddy

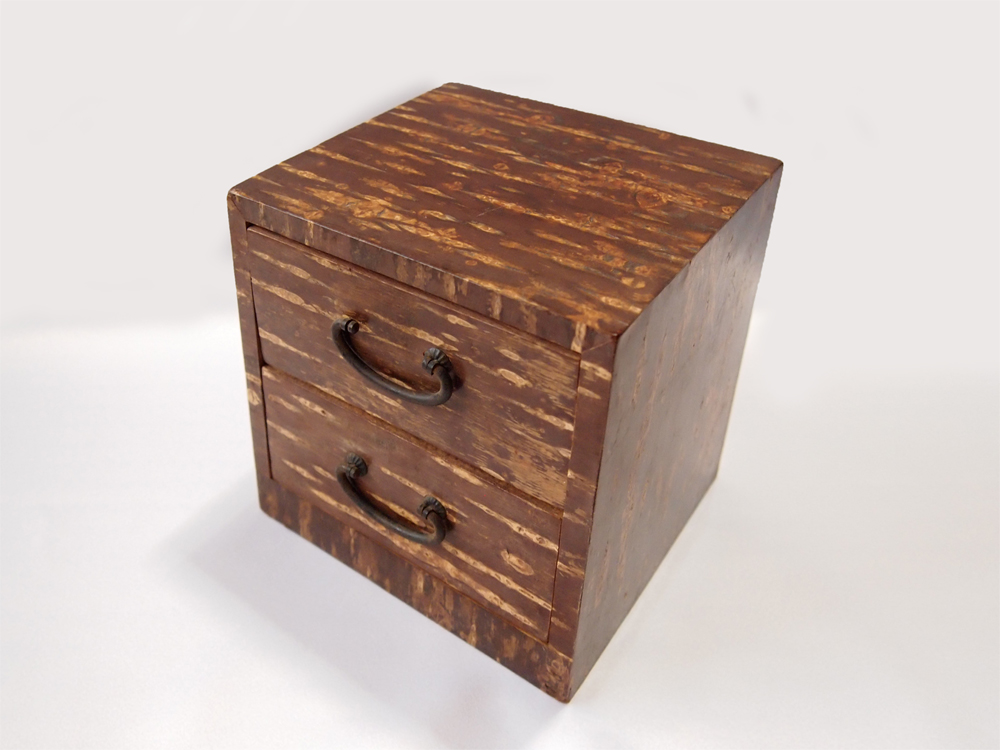
small Tansu

Kabazaiku (樺細工) (literally "birch craftsmanship") is the traditional Japanese art of fashioning tea boxes, smoking accessories, and other woodworks out of the bark of a cherry tree.

The name is somewhat misleading, as 樺 (kaba, birch) bark is hardly used in practice. It is believed that the term originally came from the association of white birch or "白樺" with homes in good standing. Thus 樺 may have described the class of artisans rather than the actual materials used. However this is just one of many explanations, with no single explanation widely accepted.

== Characteristics ==
Traditional kabazaiku is normally small-scale, and focuses on perfectionist detailing of the rounded shapes such as storage containers for tea and tobacco. Keeping moisture levels relatively constant, the cherry bark acts as a natural insulator against changes in humidity, which is essential in the storage of tea and tobacco leaves. The colour is generally a dark red, partially from the bark itself, and partially from the tree's sap.

== Origin ==
Believed to have originated by utilising techniques from a cadet house of the Satake clan, the Hokke (Northern Branch), in the Northeastern city of Kakunodate, Akita prefecture as a secondary vocation for lower-rank samurai, the tradition is said to be over 200 years old. It is passed on today through artisan workshops in the region. The "Kakunodate Kougei Kyohdohkumiai" museum in the town's samurai district has extensive exhibitions of kabazaiku artwork, as well as regular demonstrations for visitors.

== Process ==
The bark of the native cherry trees is first cleaned and treated to make it smooth and uniform. The wood of the tree itself is cut into the desired shape, the bark is then reapplied to the wood using the sap as an adhesive. The application process involves using a small metal trowel which is heated over a fire. Because every surface requires a separate, independently shaped piece of bark, the labour is time-intensive.

== Modern application ==
In addition to tea boxes and tobacco accessories, modern kabazaiku craftsman also create larger-scale wooden artworks intended more for display than for specific use. Clocks, storage containers, calligraphy brushes, and sword sheathes are also produced.

== See also ==
- List of Traditional Crafts of Japan
