= Alison Appleton =

British ceramic designer

Alison Appleton (born 1965) is a British ceramic designer based in the Baltic Triangle, Liverpool, specializing in porcelain teaware.

== Work ==
Appleton has a degree in printed textile design from Liverpool College of Art, and established her own studio in 1998. She has been retailing under her own brand since 2012.

Her collections are influenced by a range of sources, using specialist clays and glazes to create different textures and finishes, and all her teapots include stainless-steel fine-mesh filters for us with fine and long-leafed teas.

Her products have been featured in various publications and magazines. In 2013 Appleton was awarded the Winner of Innovation Award by Merseyside Women of the Year for her work in establishing international trade, and the following year she was appointed an Export Champion by UK Trade and Investment North West.
