= Adagio Teas =

American tea company

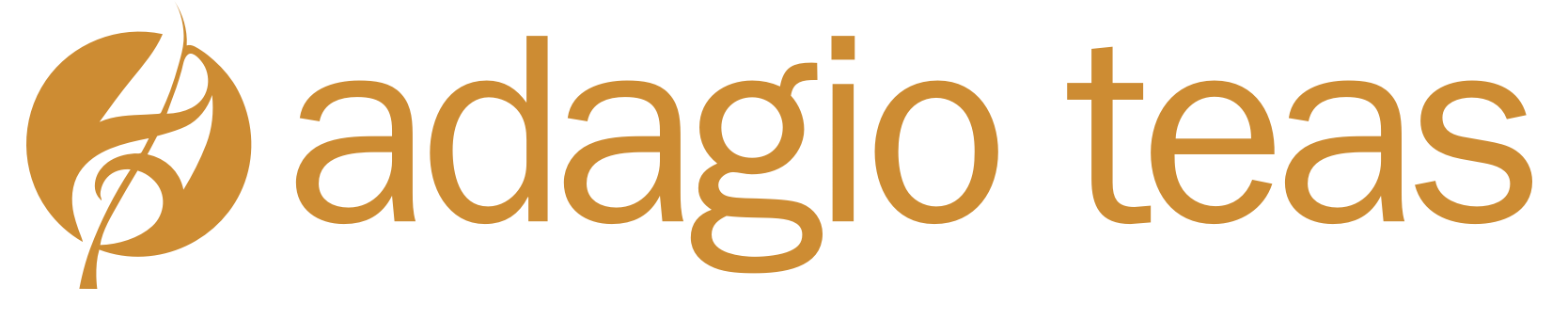
- Company type: Private
- Industry: Tea
- Founded: 1999
- Founders: Sofya Kreymerman; Michael Kreymerman; Ilya Kreymerman
- Headquarters: East Rutherford, New Jersey, United States
- Products: Tea, tea blends, teaware, and tea accessories
- Divisions: Lardera Coffee Roasters; Selefina
- Website: adagio.com

Adagio Teas is an American specialty tea company that sells teas and tea accessories. Founded in 1999, the family-owned business is headquartered in East Rutherford, New Jersey.

== History ==
Adagio Teas was founded in 1999 by Sofya Kreymerman and her sons, Michael and Ilya, operating initially from the family's basement in New Jersey. Later, Adagio launched an online store and moved its headquarters to a 10,000-square-foot warehouse in Clifton, New Jersey in 2001.

By 2006, Adagio operated from a 26,000-square-foot facility in Garfield, New Jersey, and added a 24,000-square-foot warehouse in Fresno, California. Adagio also began distributing products through retail channels and launched a wholesale division, AdagioXL.

In October 2010, Adagio opened its first brick-and-mortar store in Naperville, Illinois. This was followed by additional stores in Skokie, Illinois, and Chicago by late 2011.

In 2016, Adagio Teas relocated its New Jersey operations to a 40,000-square-foot facility in Elmwood Park. In 2025, the company moved again to an 80,000 square-foot facility in East Rutherford, NJ.

A coffee division, Lardera Coffee Roasters, was added in 2021. In 2025, it imports and sells coffee from Costa Rica, Peru, Colombia, and Ethiopia.

In 2022 the company launched Selefina, an online shop for herbs and spices. In 2024 it introduced a new version of Teforia smart tea infuser, having acquired the assets of the eponymous company when it shut down in 2017.

== Operations ==
Adagio Teas sources and sells loose-leaf teas, tea blends, and related merchandise. Its catalog includes single-origin teas, flavored blends, herbal infusions, and teaware. Adagio developed its own line of tea accessories, including the "IngenuiTEA" infuser and "realiTEA" tea bags, as well as an annual Tea Advent calendar.

Adagio's business model is based on e-commerce. Adagio created a network of community websites, including TeaMuse (an online magazine), TeaChat (discussion forums), TeaMap (a map of tea rooms), TeaChef (a recipe-sharing site), and TeaCritic (a consumer review platform). Adagio's website also allows customers to design and share custom tea blends.

In addition to online sales, Adagio's wholesale division supplies teas to cafés, restaurants, and shops. Its retail stores in Illinois function as retail locations and spaces for tea sampling and brewing demonstrations.
