= Teaware =

Traditional equipment for drinking tea in some cultures

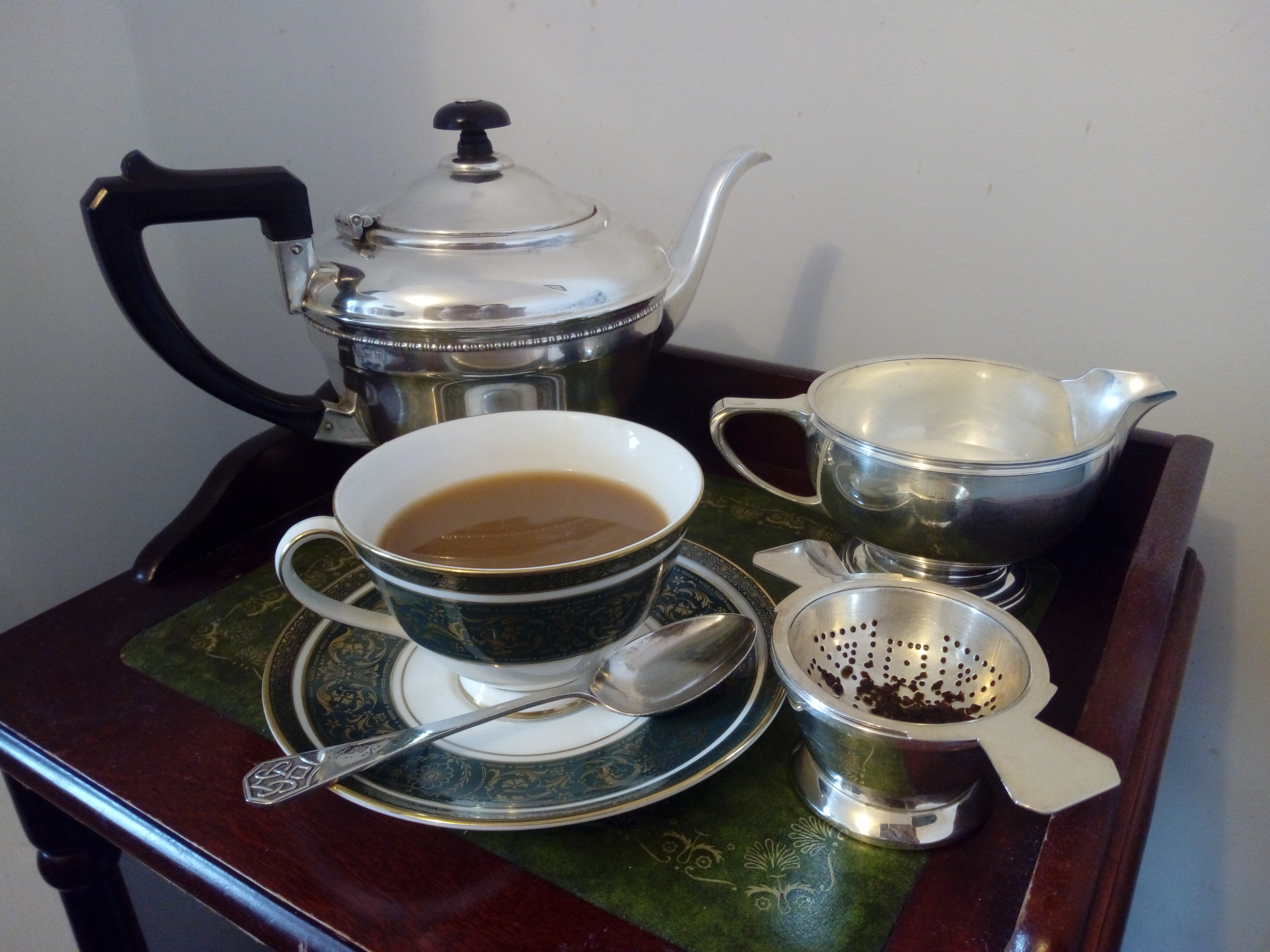
English teaware

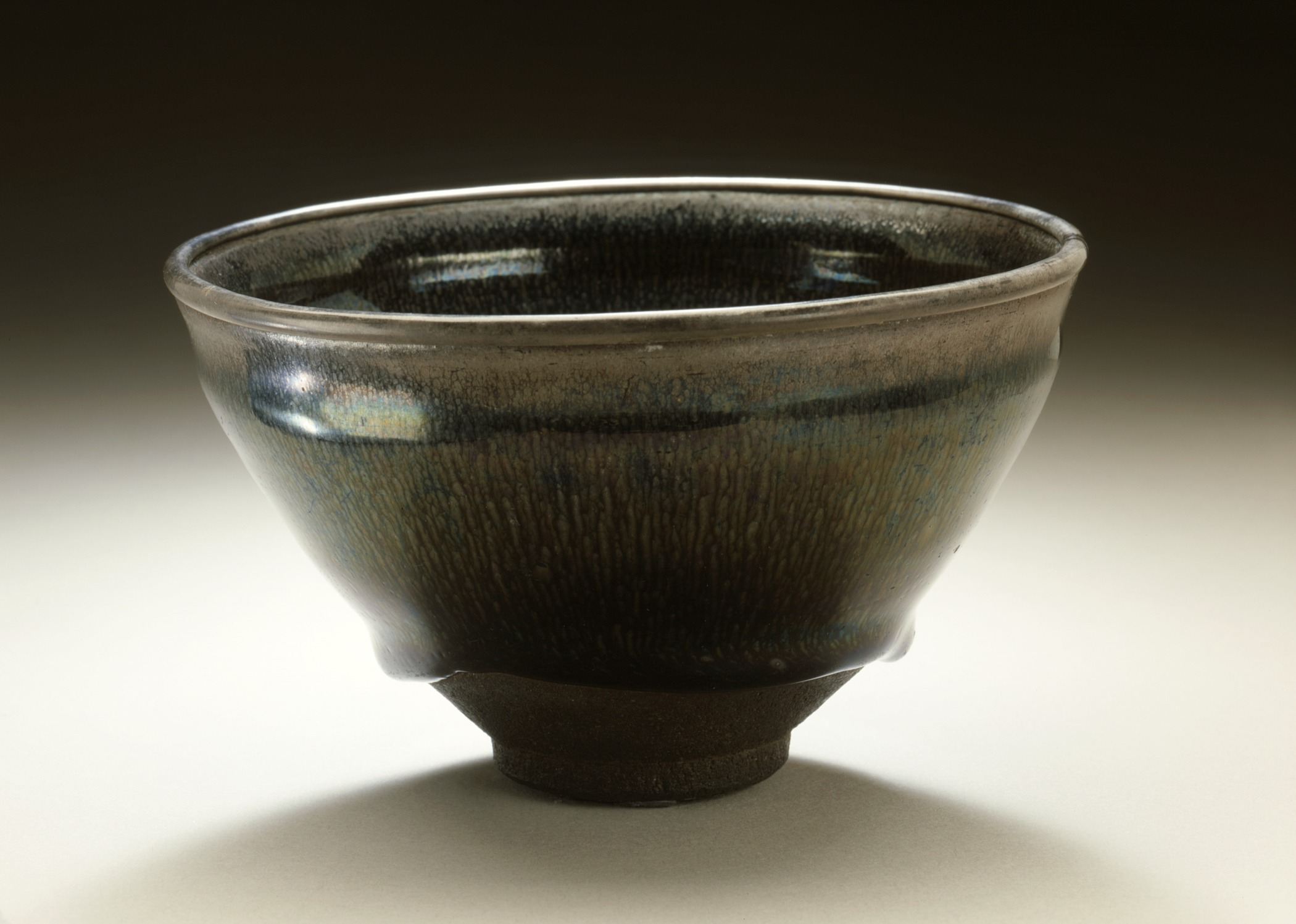
Chawan (tea bowl) with "hare's fur" pattern, Jian ware from China during the Song dynasty

Teaware is a broad international spectrum of equipment used in the brewing and consumption of tea. Many components make up that spectrum, and vary greatly based upon the type of tea being prepared, and the cultural setting in which it is being prepared. This is often referred to as the tea ceremony, and holds much significance in many cultures, particularly in northwestern Europe and in eastern Asia. A complete, cohesive collection of tea ware makes up a tea set.

== Components ==
Teaware (may be part of a Tea set)
| Teapot | Used to steep tea leaves in hot water |
| Tea kettle | Used to boil water |
| Teacup | Vessels from which to drink the hot tea (after the leaves have been strained). There are many different kinds of tea cups. |
| Tea tray | Used to hold teaware; also keeps the tea and hot water from spilling onto the table |
| Tea strainer | Used to extract leaves from tea solutions |
| Tea ball (infuser) | Used to hold tea leaves in water for removal after steeping |
| Tea bag | Alternative to the tea ball |
| Teabag holder / coaster | Sized for holding a tea bag or ball |
| Tea caddy | For storing tea when not being consumed |
| Tea cosy | A knitted cover for keeping a teapot hot after the tea is made |

=== Alternatives / Others ===
- Chaki, the caddy used at Japanese tea ceremonies.
- Chawan, tea bowl used in East Asian tea ceremonies
- Coffee cup, instead of tea cup
- Gaiwan, lidded cup for brewing and decanting or tea may even be drunk out of the vessel directly
- Japanese tea utensils, used in their tea ceremonies
- Mug, instead of tea cup
- Tea draining tray, for the Gongfu tea ceremony

== Construction ==
Tea equipment may be constructed of many materials, from iron in Japan to porcelain and clay in China, and also bamboo and other woods. Of particular repute are the Yixing clay teapots produced in eastern China, a type of Yixing ware. The Brown Betty was originally made from red clay found in Britain.

== Lu Yu's tea set (陸羽的茶具) ==
Brazier of Lu Yu

- Crushing block (砧椎)
- Brazier (風爐)
- Charcoal basket (炭筥)
- Charcoal mallet (炭檛)
- Fire chopsticks (火筴)
- Cauldron (鍑)
- Cauldron stand (交床)
- Tea tongs (夾)
- Paper wallet (紙囊)
- Crushing roller (碾)
- Sieve box (羅合)
- Tea holder (則)
- Water vessel (水方)
- Water filter bag (漉水囊)
- Gourd scooper (瓢)
- Bamboo tongs (竹夾)
- Salt container (鹺簋)
- Boiled water vessel (熟盂)
- Bowl (碗)
- Bowl basket (畚)
- Brush (劄)
- Water basin (滌方)
- Spent tea basin (滓方)
- Tea cloth (巾)
- Utensil table (具列)
- Utensil basket (都籃)

== The twelve tea pieces for the elderly (審安老人的12茶具) ==
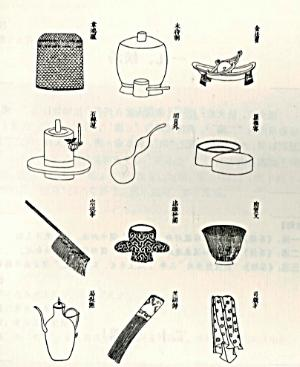
Song Dynasty Chinese tea ware

1. Brazier (風爐)
2. Crushing block (砧椎)
3. Crushing roller (碾)
4. Stone mill (石磨)
5. Gourd scooper (瓢)
6. Sieve box (羅合)
7. Brush (札)
8. Bowl basket (畚)
9. Bowl (碗)
10. Water vessel (水方)
11. Tea whisk (茶筅)
12. Tea cloth (巾)

The above tea pieces were also mentioned by Lu Yu in The Classic of Tea, except for the stone mill (石磨) and tea whisk (茶筅).

== See also ==
- Flagstaff House Museum of Teaware
- List of Japanese tea ceremony equipment
