= Brown Betty =

Brown Betty may refer to:

- Brown Betty (dessert), a dessert typically made with apples
- Brown Betty (horse), a British Thooughbred racehorse.
- Rudbeckia hirta, a flower commonly known as brown Betty
- Brown Betty (teapot)
- "Brown Betty" (Fringe), an episode of the television series Fringe
