= Tea strainer =

Sieve for catching loose tea leaves

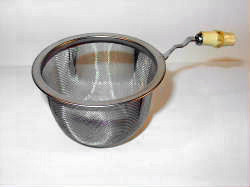
A tea strainer with a handle that is made of bamboo.

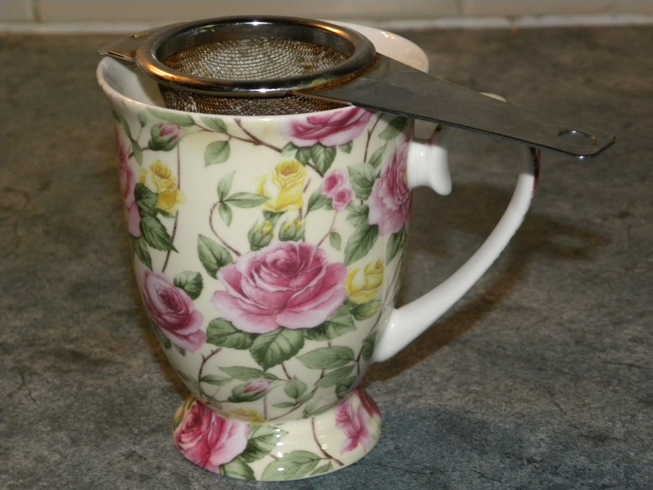
A tea strainer on a teacup.

A tea strainer is a type of strainer that is placed over or in a teacup to catch loose tea leaves. Despite the invention of the tea bag, it continues to be used widely as of 2026.

== Function ==
When tea is brewed in the traditional manner in a teapot, the tea leaves are not contained in teabags; rather, they are freely suspended in the water. As the leaves themselves are not consumed with the tea, it is usual to filter them out with a tea strainer. Strainers usually fit into the top of the cup to catch the leaves as the tea is poured.

Some deeper tea strainers can also be used to brew single cups of tea, much as teabags or brewing baskets are used – the strainer full of leaves is set in a cup to brew the tea. It is then removed, along with the spent tea leaves, when the tea is ready to drink. By using a tea strainer in this way, the same leaves can be used to brew multiple cups.

== Continued use after invention of tea bag ==
Despite the fact that tea strainer use has declined in the 20th century with mass production of the tea bag, it is still preferred among connoisseurs, who claim that keeping the leaves packed in a bag, rather than freely circulating, inhibits diffusion. Many assert that inferior ingredients, namely dust-quality tea, are often used in tea bags.

== Materials ==
Tea strainers are usually either sterling silver, stainless steel, or china/porcelain. Strainers often come in a set, with the strainer itself and a small saucer for it to rest on between cups. Tea strainers themselves have often been turned into artistic masterpieces of the silver- and goldsmith's craft, as well as rarer specimens of fine porcelain.

== Brewing or infusing baskets ==
Brewing baskets (or infusing baskets) resemble tea strainers, but are more typically put in the top of a teapot to keep the tea leaves contained during brewing. There is no definitive boundary between a brewing basket and a tea strainer, and the same tool might be used for both purposes.

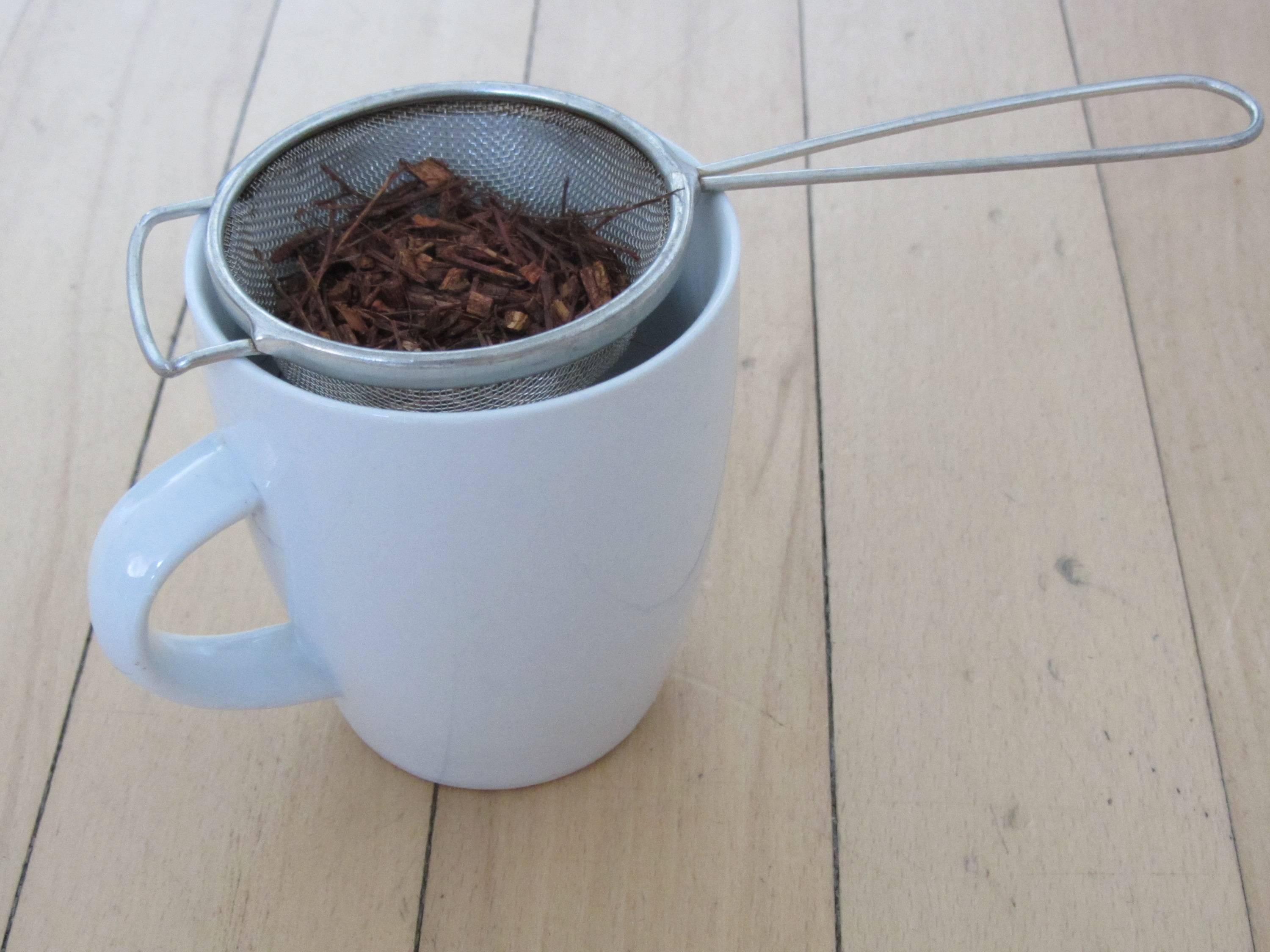
A mug of rooibos tea with a tea strainer.

== Non-tea uses ==
Tea strainers may also be used for separating milk solids from ghee. A further use is to separate the liquid from the solid when preparing Béarnaise sauce.

Tea strainers or a similar small sieve may also be used by patients trying to pass a kidney stone. The patient urinates through the strainer, thereby ensuring that, if a stone is passed, it will be caught for evaluation and diagnosis.

== See also ==
- Bombilla
- Cheesecloth
- Coffee filter
- Infuser
