= Teapot =

Vessel for preparing and serving tea

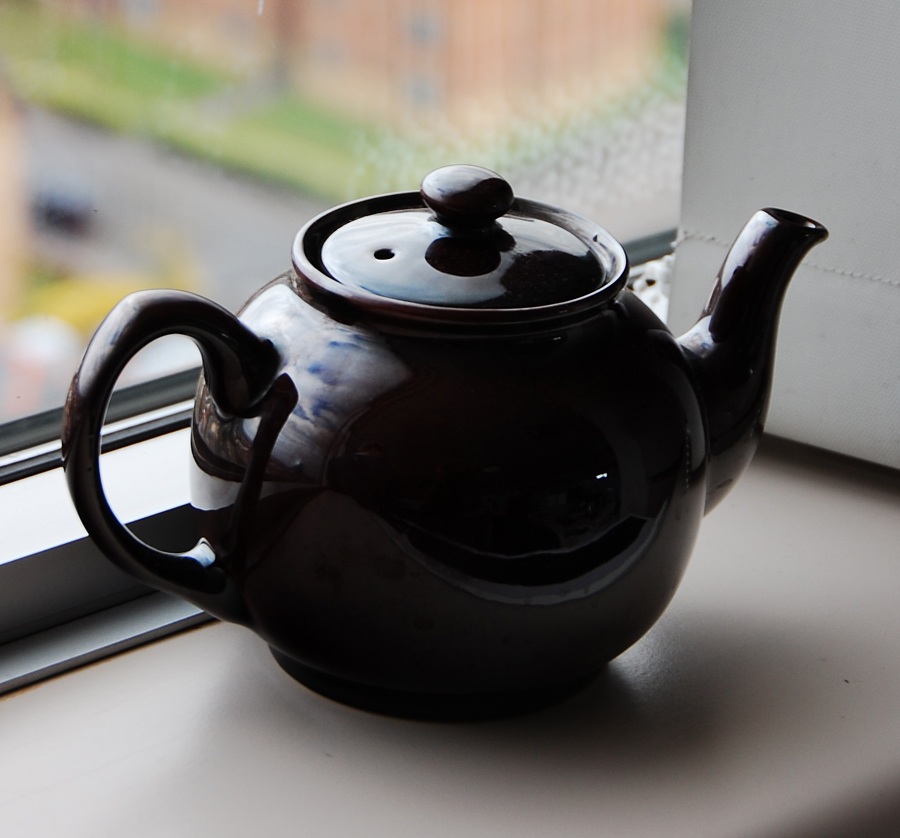
A Brown Betty teapot

A teapot is a vessel used for steeping tea leaves or a herbal mix in boiling or near-boiling water and serving the resulting infusion called tea; usually put in a teacup. It is one of the core components of teaware.

Teapots usually have an opening with a lid at their top, where the dry tea and hot water are added, a handle for holding by hand, and a spout through which the tea is served. Some teapots have a strainer built-in on the inner edge of the spout. A small air hole in the lid is often created to stop the spout from dripping and splashing when tea is poured. In modern times, a thermally insulating cover called a tea cosy may be used to enhance the steeping process or to prevent the contents of the teapot from cooling too rapidly.

Dry tea is available either in tea bags or as loose tea, in which case a tea infuser or tea strainer may be of some assistance, either to hold the leaves as they steep or to catch the leaves inside the teapot when the tea is poured.

== History ==
=== China ===
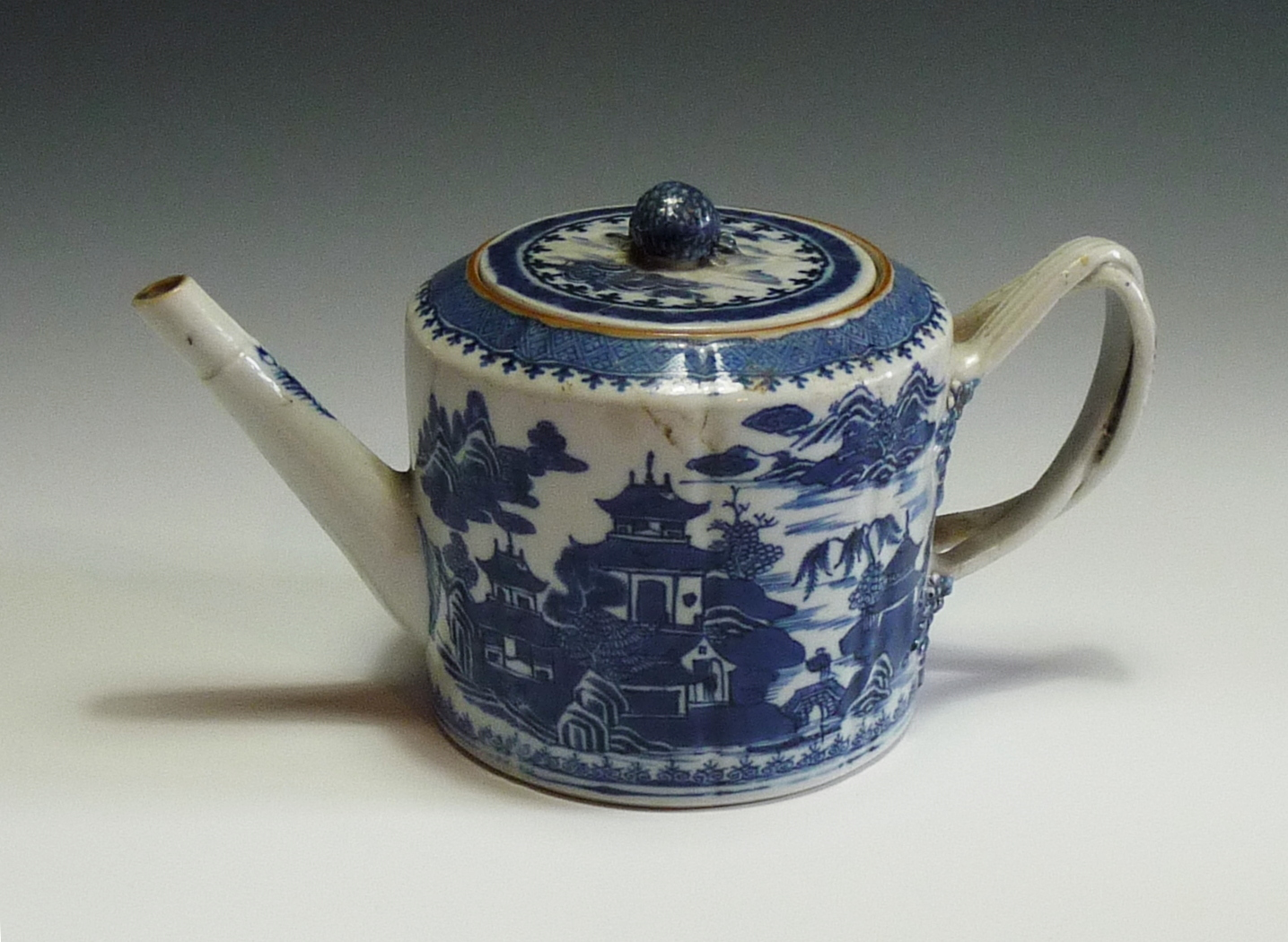
Chinese porcelain hand painted blue and white teapot, 18th century

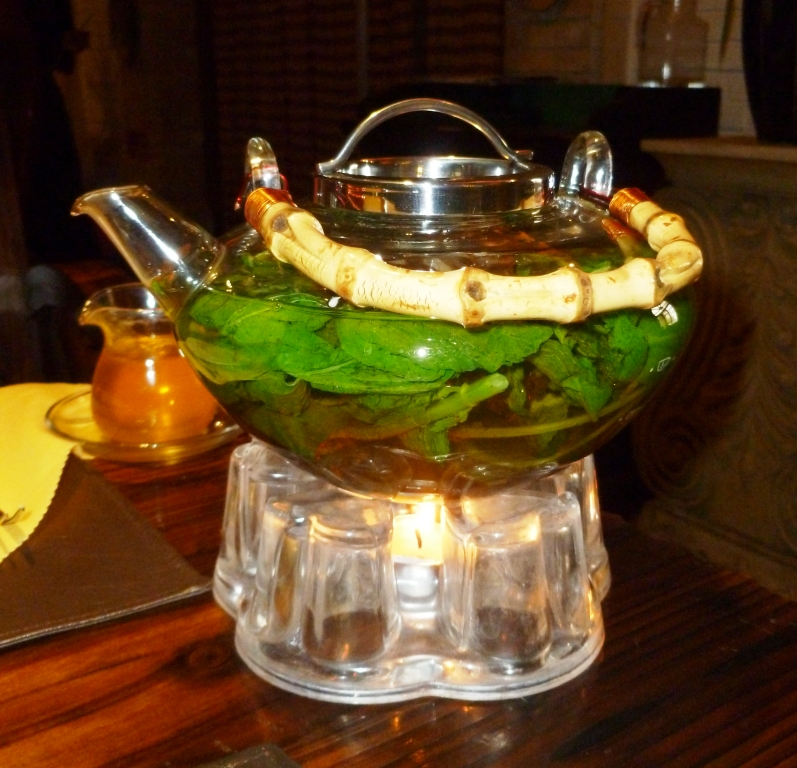
Glass teapot containing mint leaves, being warmed by a tealight, Kashgar, Xinjiang, China

The switch to specialized vessels for tea brewing was powered by the change from powdered tea to leaf tea and from whipping to steeping in China. It is hard to pinpoint the time of the invention of the teapot since vessels in shapes similar to the modern teapot were known in China since the Neolithic period but were initially used for water and wine, as boiling or whipping tea did not require a specialized container. When tea preparation switched to infusion (during the late Yuan dynasty), an ewer-like vessel was first used. Tea preparation during previous dynasties did not use a teapot.

In the Tang dynasty, a cauldron was used to boil ground tea and serve it in bowls. Song dynasty tea was made by boiling water in a kettle and then pouring the water into a bowl with finely ground tea leaves. A brush was then used to stir the tea. Written evidence of a teapot appears in the text Jìyuán Cónghuà (霽園叢話), which describes a teapot that the author, Cài Sīzhān 蔡司霑, inherited from the Yuan Dynasty scholar Sūn Dàomíng 孫道明 (1296-1376)， with the inscription "且吃茶清隱" “just drink tea clear up your secrets”. By the Ming dynasty, teapots were widespread in China. There are early examples of teapots, like the ones made in Jun ware and the eight-lobed celadon pots of the Song-Yuan times. Still, an expert on Yixing ware, Kuei-Hsiang Lo, believes that the first teapots made especially for tea appeared around 1500 as copies of much earlier Yixing wine pots. The earliest example of such a teapot that has survived to this day seems to be the one in the Flagstaff House Museum of Teaware; it has been dated to 1513 and is attributed to Gong Chun, the "father of Yixing teapot".

Early teapots, like those still used in modern Gongfu tea ceremonies, were small by Western standards meant for individual tea consumption. They use a higher ratio of leaves to water, which enables the brewer to control the brewing variables to create several small infusions. After brewing, tea would be decanted into a separate vessel, distributed into the small cups of several drinkers, and brewed again. This allows the tea to be brewed skillfully and allows the flavor changes to be experienced through the various infusions.

Teapots made from pottery materials such as clay have been hand-fired for tens of thousands of years, originally in China. Clay is a popular material for teapots, as they tend to retain heat very well.

Many traditional Chinese teaware are Yixing ware. Yixing and other regional clays are left unglazed. This allows the clay to absorb the flavor of the teas brewed over time and enhance the taste of the tea going forward. Some Gongfu practitioners designate their unglazed pots for specific types, sometimes even particular tea varietals.

From the end of the 17th century, tea was shipped from China to Europe as part of the export of exotic spices and luxury goods. The ships that brought the tea also carried porcelain teapots. The majority of these teapots were painted in blue and white underglaze. Porcelain, being completely vitrified, will withstand sea water without damage, so the teapots were packed below deck whilst the tea was stowed above deck to ensure that it remained dry.

=== Japan ===
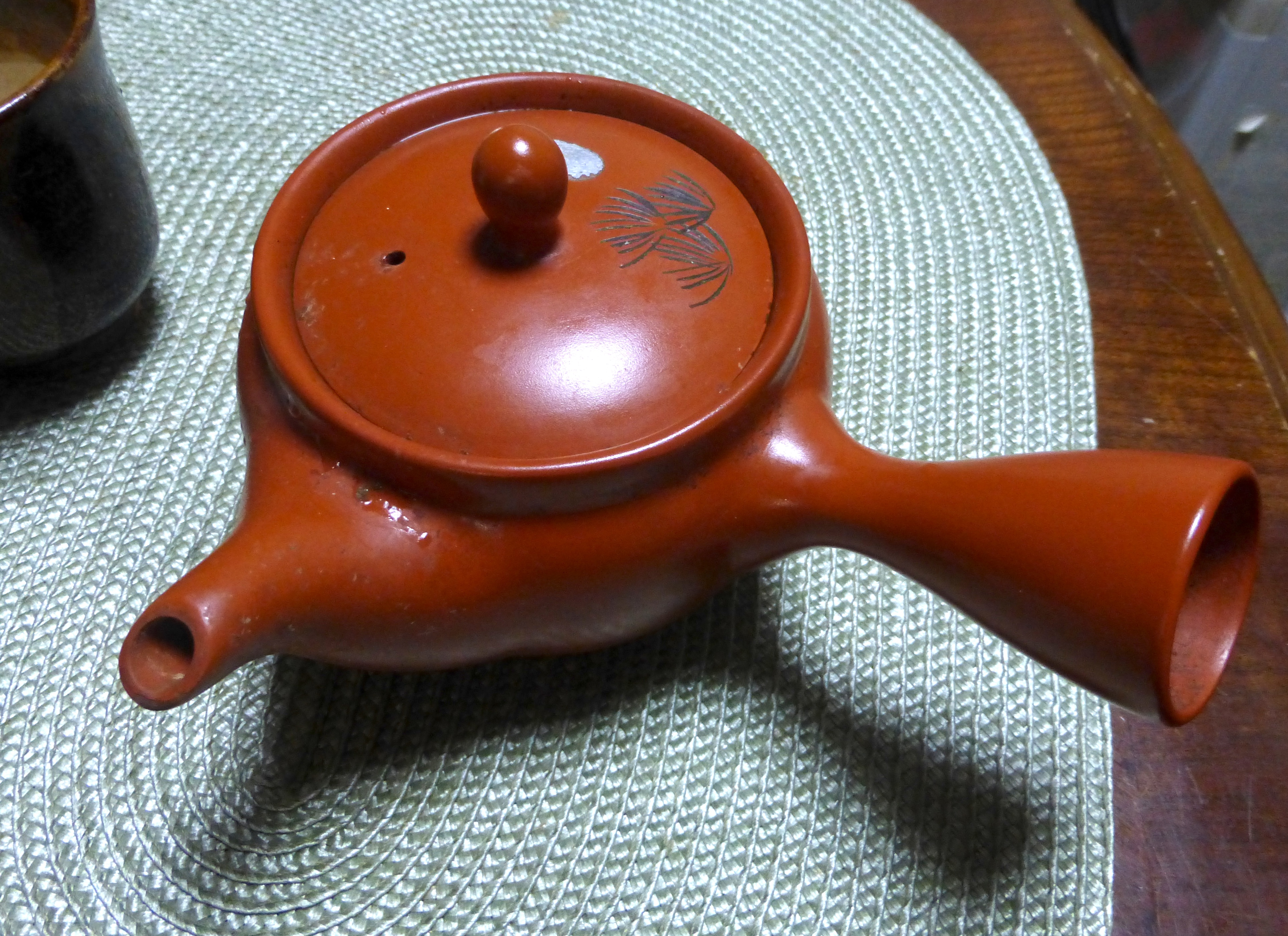
A traditional Japanese teapot, kyūsu, is commonly used for making Japanese green tea, sencha. It often has a handle on the side of the pot

The kyūsu (急須), a common and traditional teapot in Japan, differs from the Chinese teapot in that it has a handle facing sideways to the spout. However, some kyūsu, like their Chinese counterparts, have the handle opposite the spout. Kyūsu is frequently made of ceramics.

The kyūsu has its origins in a Chinese tool used for tea ceremonies. Although the Chinese tool may have been used to boil water, it is unclear if it was used to steep tea back then. In Japan, kyūsu has been used since at least the 18th century.

The side arrangement of the handle is considered unique to Japan. However, the same feature can be found in some Chinese tools mentioned above.

=== Morocco ===
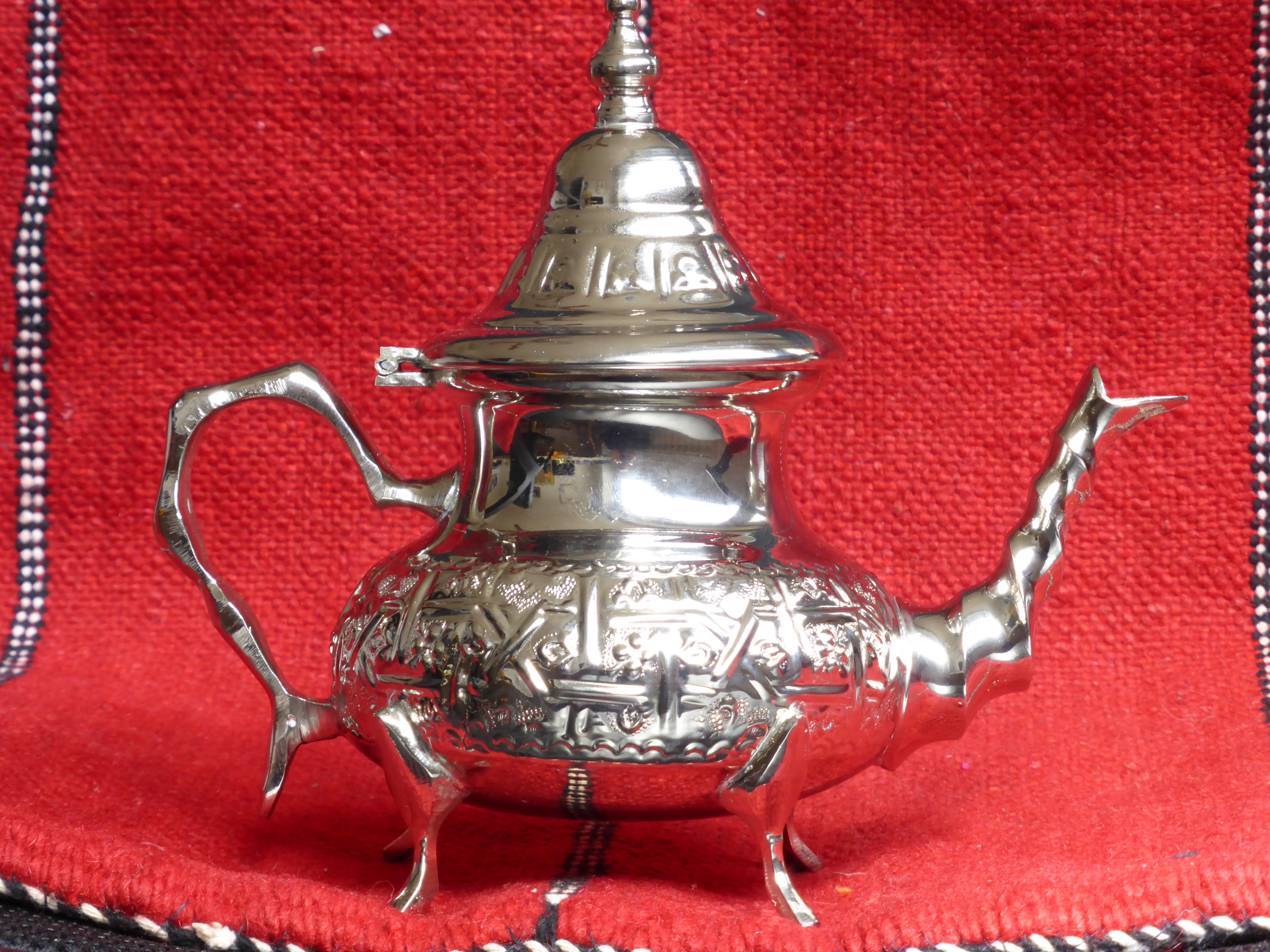
A traditional Moroccan tea pot

In Morocco, stainless steel teapots are essential for making Moroccan mint tea. Moroccan teapots are heat-resistant and can be put directly on the stove. Colorful tea glasses are part of the Moroccan tea ritual. The tea is considered drinkable only when it has foam on top. Teapots have a long curved spout to pour tea from a height of around 12 inches (30 cm) above the glasses, which produces foam on the surface of the tea. Their designs can range from simple to heavily decorated.

=== Tibet ===
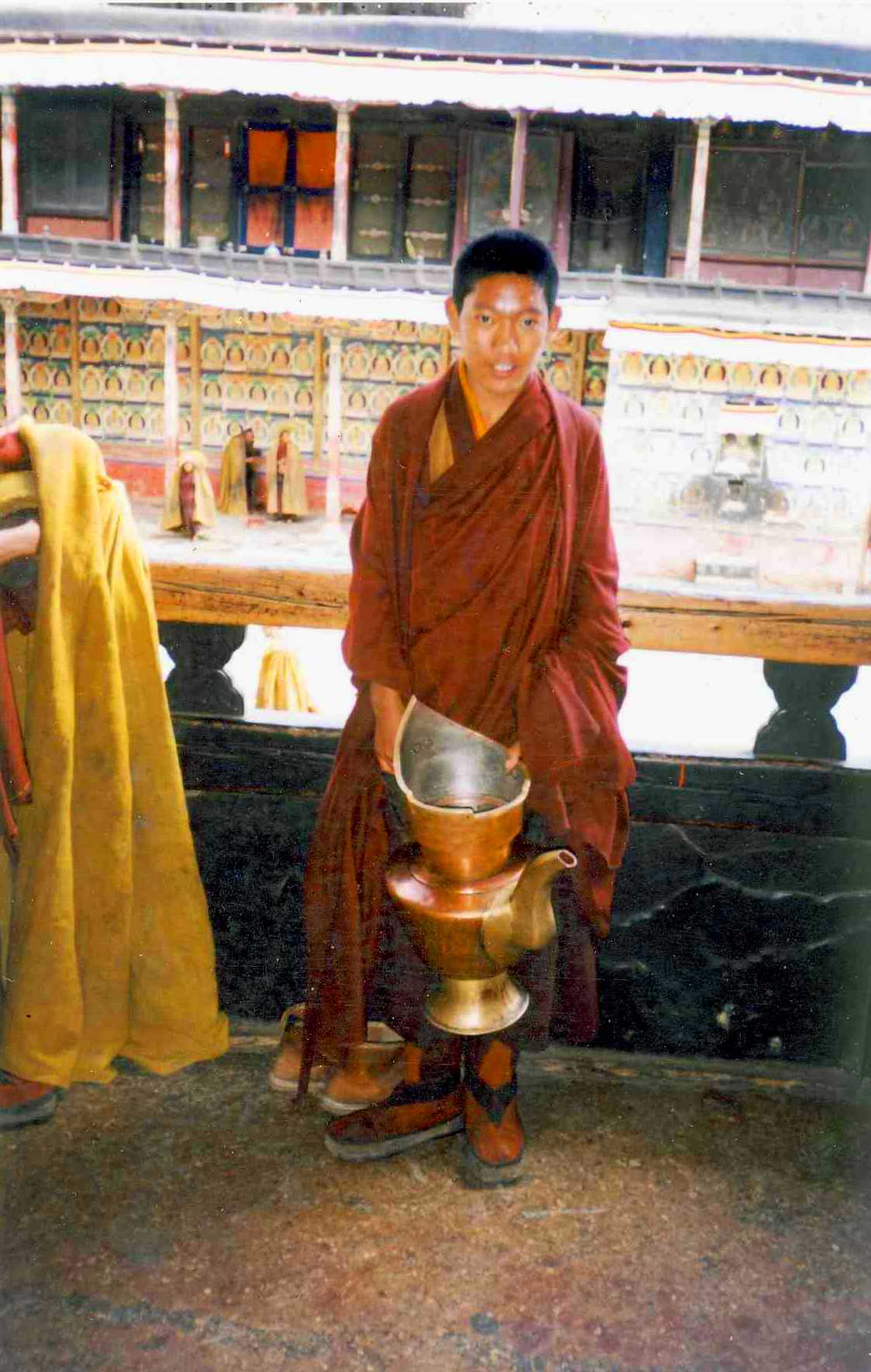
Novice monk holding a large teapot. Tashilhunpo, Tibet

Teapots for butter tea in Tibet evolved simultaneously with teapots in China, eventually settling on a pitcher-like shape.

=== Europe ===
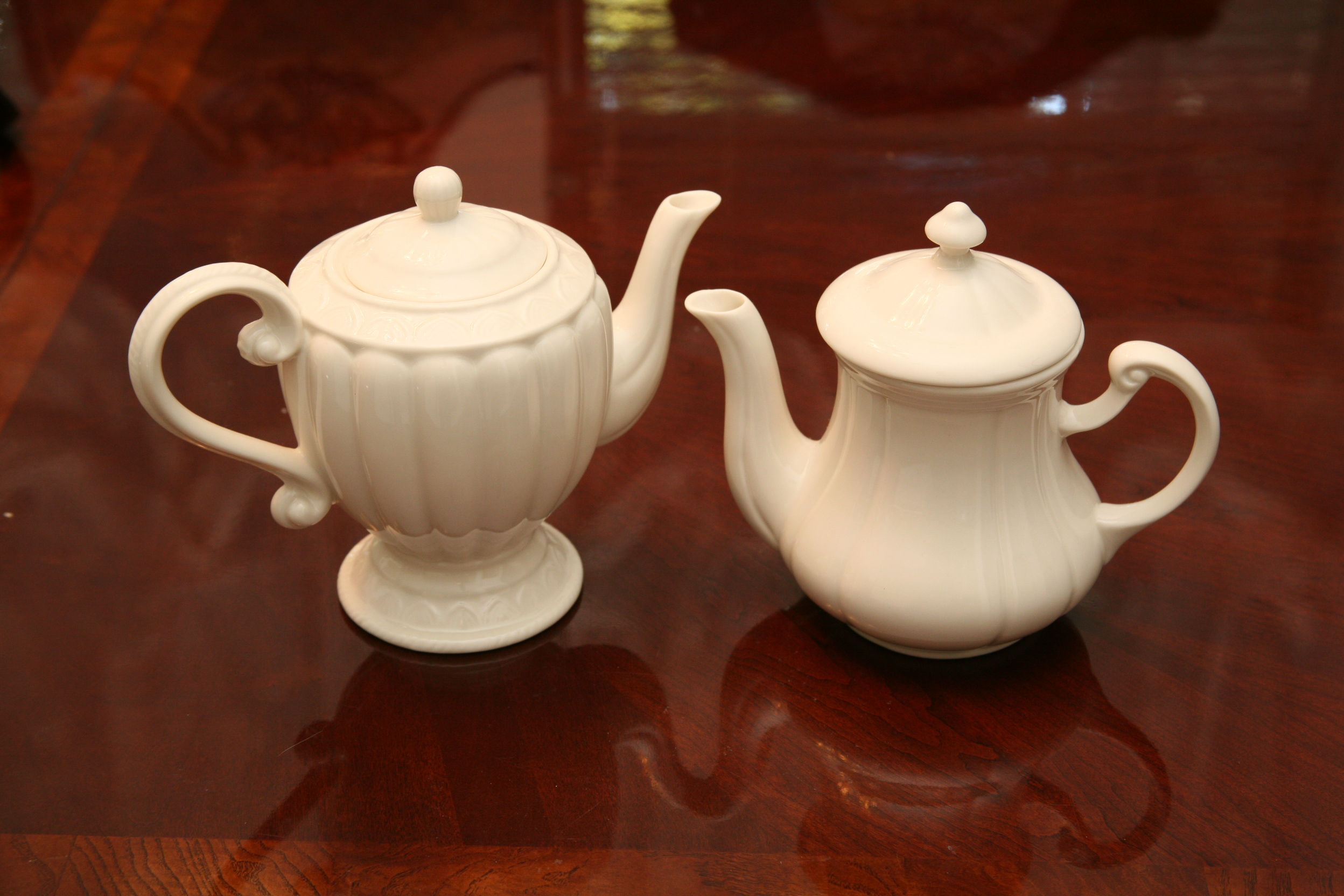
Two Victorian era teapots

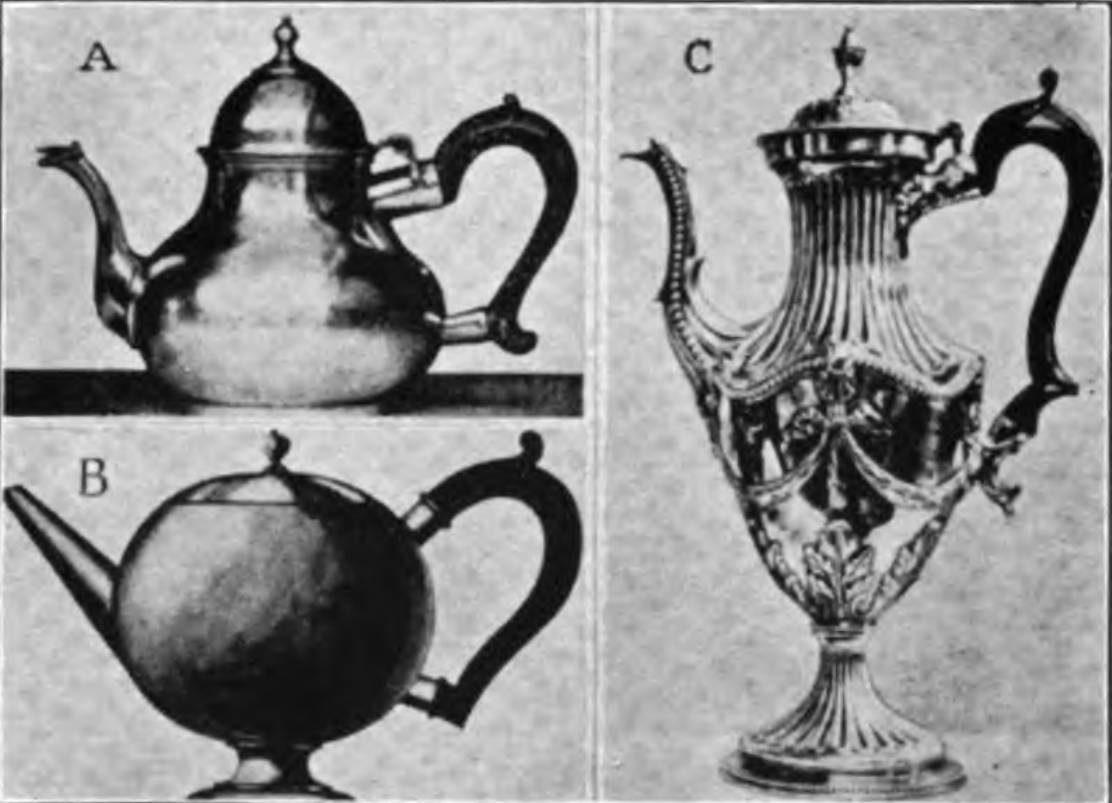
Shapes of 18th-century European teapots: A - pear-shaped (pyriform), B - globular, C - vase/urn

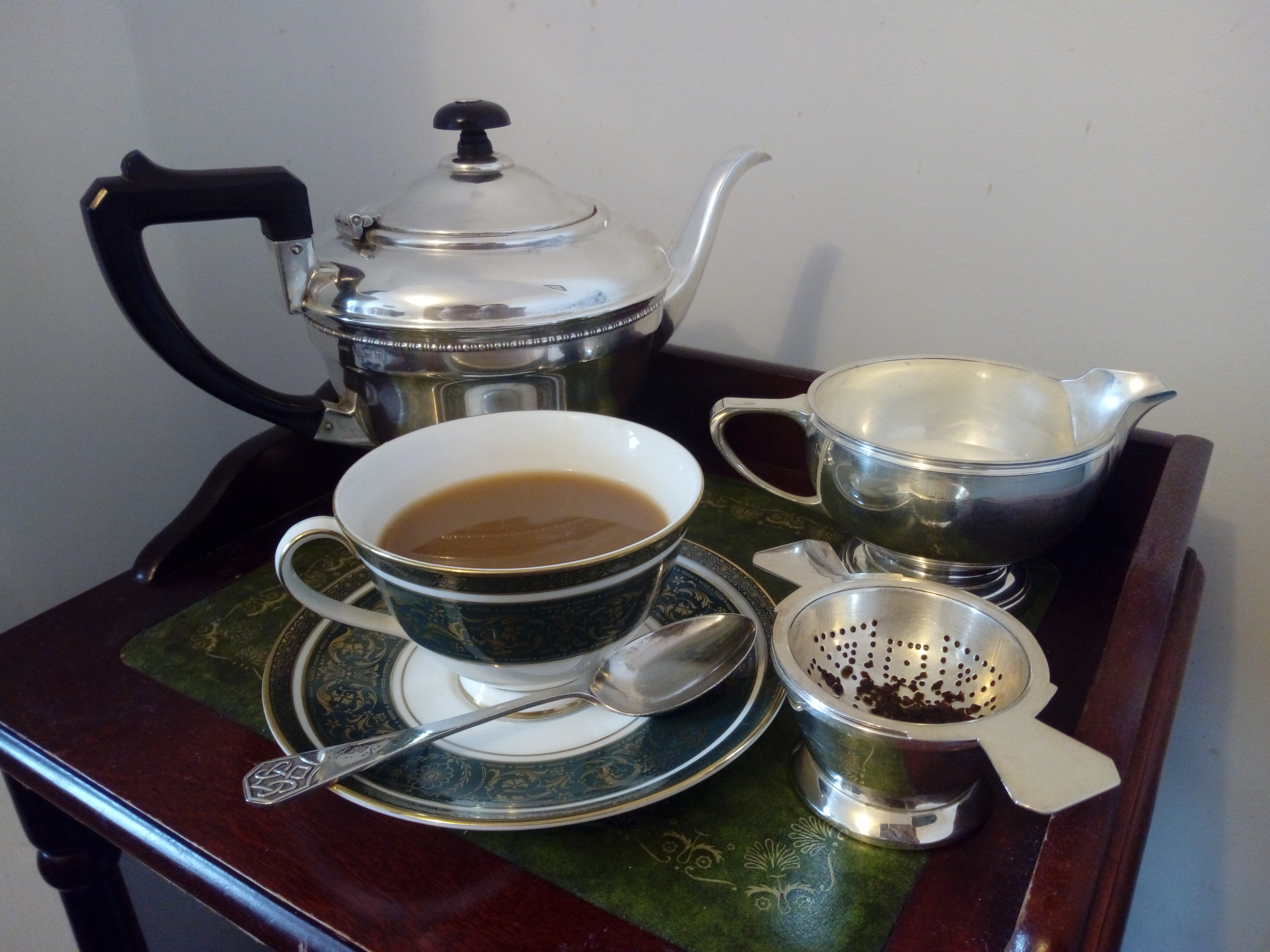
English silver teapot with teaware

The Yixing teapots came to Europe with the tea and became known as boccaro ("large mouth" in Portuguese). The Chinese teapot models were used since preserving the Chinese way of drinking was considered essential. The first known order for teapots "with covers and handles" dates back to 1639. Porcelain teapots were particularly desirable because porcelain could not be made in Europe back then, and tea drinking in Europe was initially the preserve of the upper classes. European teapots at the time were made of silver, with the earliest preserved English one at the Victoria and Albert Museum, dated 1670, looking identical to the earlier coffee pots. They can be identified as teapots only through an inscription. At the same time, copies of the Chinese earthenware teapots were produced (Fulham Pottery in London had already been manufacturing these in 1670). It was not until 1708 that the first successful experiments by von Tschirnhaus enabled Böttger and the Meissen factory in Dresden to start the operation in 1710 and produce good copies of Japanese Kakiemon and Imari porcelain.

When European potteries in Holland, Germany, and England began making tea wares, they initially imitated the Chinese boccaro designs. However, many English potteries decided not to risk money on the new material and continued manufacturing earthenware and stoneware pots; the famed creamware services made in Staffordshire reached popularity in the second half of the 18th century.

At the turn of the 18th century, the design and decoration of the European teapot started to deviate from the Chinese tradition, with the pear shape, or pyriform, being the first major novation. An early English pyriform teapot dates back to 1690. The shape became widespread at the time of Queen Anne and has remained in vogue since then. The other popular shapes in the 18th century were "globular" (sphere-like vessel on a raised foot) and a vase (or urn, Louis XV style), with the latter being a rare comeback to the wine-pot origins of a teapot.

In the last half of the 18th century, English factories introduced the matched sets of teaware. The original demand for "China" porcelain tea sets was eventually replaced, at least among the wealthy, with enthusiasm for silver pieces that were produced extensively by the end of the reign of George III. This period also saw a reduction in the price of tea, so teapots became larger. Also, cheaper pewter sets were made for the less affluent, mostly as simplified copies of the silver pieces.

=== America ===
In colonial America, Boston became the epicenter for silver production and artistry. Among the many artists in Boston, there were four major families in the city's silver market: Edwards, Revere, Burt, and Hurd. Their works of art included silver teapots. Two new "colonial" shapes appeared in the late Georgian era: oval and octagonal teapots with flat bases, plain handles in the shape of C, and, frequently, straight tapering spouts.

== Heat retention ==
The ability of a teapot to keep heat depends on the material. For example, stoneware is supposed to keep the heat better than porcelain.

To keep teapots hot after the tea is first brewed, English households since the 18th century employed the tea cosy, a padded fabric covering, much like a hat, that slips over the teapot. The tea cosy became very popular in the 20th century as a practical and decorative object in the kitchen.

== Features ==
Teapots evolved from the designs where the lid was resting in a recess of the body of the vessel to the lid sitting on top of the body, and then to the modern design with the deep flanges of the lid preventing it from falling out.

When the tea is poured out, outside air needs to enter the teapot's body; therefore, the design involves either a loosely fitting lid or a vent hole at the top of the pot, usually in the lid.

The built-in strainer at the base of the spout was borrowed from coffeepots that, in turn, get this feature from the vessels designed for other liquids (the earliest known built-in strainer dates back to 1300 BC).

The coffee drip brew and coffee percolator were invented at the beginning of the 19th century, and similar designs for tea were developed soon after that.

Modern infusers originated in 1817 when an English patent was granted for a "tea or coffee biggin", a metal basket at the bottom of the teapot. Many more tea leaf holder designs followed, with tea balls and tea-making spoons arriving in the first half of the 19th century.

The first automated electric teapot was invented in 1909.

== Materials ==
The typical materials used for teapots have been stoneware (Yixing), porcelain, silver, and gold.

Making teapots from silver has a major disadvantage: the thermal conductivity of silver is the highest of any metal. Therefore, the handles of antique silver teapots were often made of wood (often apple-wood or pear-wood) or ivory. If the handles were made from silver, they would be attached to the pot's body with thermally insulating plugs, usually made from ivory. Without such features, the teapot would be uncomfortable or painful to pick up when filled with hot tea.

Teapots made of tin arrived around 1700, allowing for very low-cost designs. At the same time, the use of Britannia ware had started. Nickel plating was introduced in the second half of the 19th century. Teapots from earthenware were produced in Staffordshire from 1720 to 1780, with curious shapes (animals, houses, etc.) made possible using molds (and not the throwing wheel). Enamelware was in wide use at the end of the 19th century.

In the 20th century, the use of aluminum became popular. The arrival of the heatproof glass made a glass teapot possible, with the first "Teaket" design manufactured in 1932.

=== Replacement handles ===
The early European teapots frequently had wooden handle replacements made from pear, hornbeam, and sycamore, either stained or ebonized (sometimes even made from ebony), connected to the pot's body using metal sockets. The use of wood to repair a broken ceramic handle started soon after the introduction of tea to Europe: the vessels were expensive and were not thrown away once damaged. To underscore the preciousness of the repaired teapot, the sockets were occasionally made from gilt silver.

== Dribbling ==
One phenomenon with some teapots is dribbling, where the flow runs down the outside of the spout, particularly as the flow starts or stops. Different explanations for this phenomenon have been proposed at various times. Making the external surface of the spout more hydrophobic and reducing the radius of curvature of the inside of the tip so that the flow detaches cleanly can avoid dribbling.

== In non-teamaking contexts ==
A teapot has a rather distinctive shape, and its fame may sometimes have little to do with its primary function.

- The Utah Teapot is a standard reference object of the computer graphics community, comparable to Hello, World for its popularity. It is included as a graphics primitive in many graphics packages, including AutoCAD, POV-Ray, OpenGL, Direct3D, and 3ds Max.
- Russell's teapot is an analogy devised by Bertrand Russell, which attacks the unfalsifiability of religious claims, comparing them to the eponymous teapot. The concept inspired the title of the 1973 album Flying Teapot by the Franco-British rock band Gong.
- The teapot has been featured in the American children's song from 1939, "I'm a Little Teapot".
- In Korea, the teapot is commonly used as a serving container for various types of wines.
- Part of the constellation of Sagittarius contains an asterism (or a star pattern not officially recognized as a constellation) that famously resembles a teapot.
- The 'Teapot Game' is a word game described by Mary White's Book of Games and involves guessing a word replaced by "teapot" in various sentences.
- The Teapot is a tale by Hans Christian Andersen.

=== In architecture ===
- In 2004, a Malaysian cult called the Sky Kingdom constructed a 35-foot-tall, cream-colored teapot with an unusually long spout, higher than the pot itself on its property as part of its private symbolism, which included a similarly large blue vase next to the teapot. As part of a crackdown on the sect in August 2005, bulldozers and heavy machinery were sent to tear down the structure.
- The (purported) world's largest architectural teapot is in West Virginia. In 1938, the Chester teapot was constructed by William "Babe" Devon. It started as a gigantic wooden hogshead barrel for a Hires Root Beer advertising campaign. Devon purchased the barrel in Pennsylvania and shipped it to Chester, West Virginia, where it was set up at the junction of State Route 2 and U.S. Route 30. A spout and handle were added, and the wooden barrel was covered with tin to shape the teapot. A large glass ball was placed on top to make the knob of the "lid". It stood in front of Devon's pottery outlet store. Local teenagers were hired to run a concession and souvenir stand inside it.
- The Teapot Dome Service Station is located in Zillah, Washington. It was built in 1922, and the 15-foot handled-and-spouted gas station was designed as a visual pun referencing the then-current Teapot Dome scandal. It has been moved multiple times and is no longer an active gas station.

== See also ==
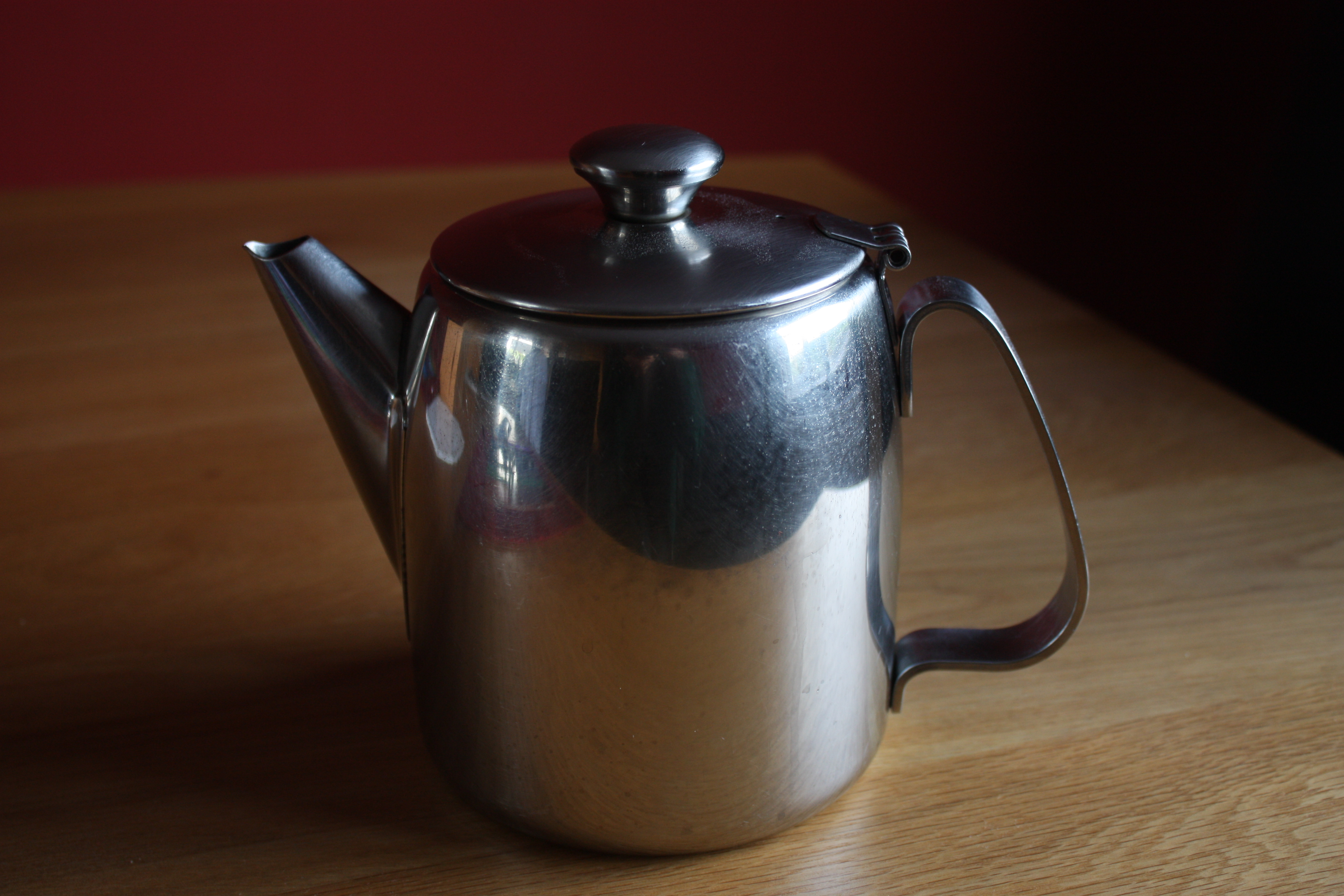
A small metal teapot for a single person from Ireland, this type may also be found in diners, greasy spoons, and some restaurants

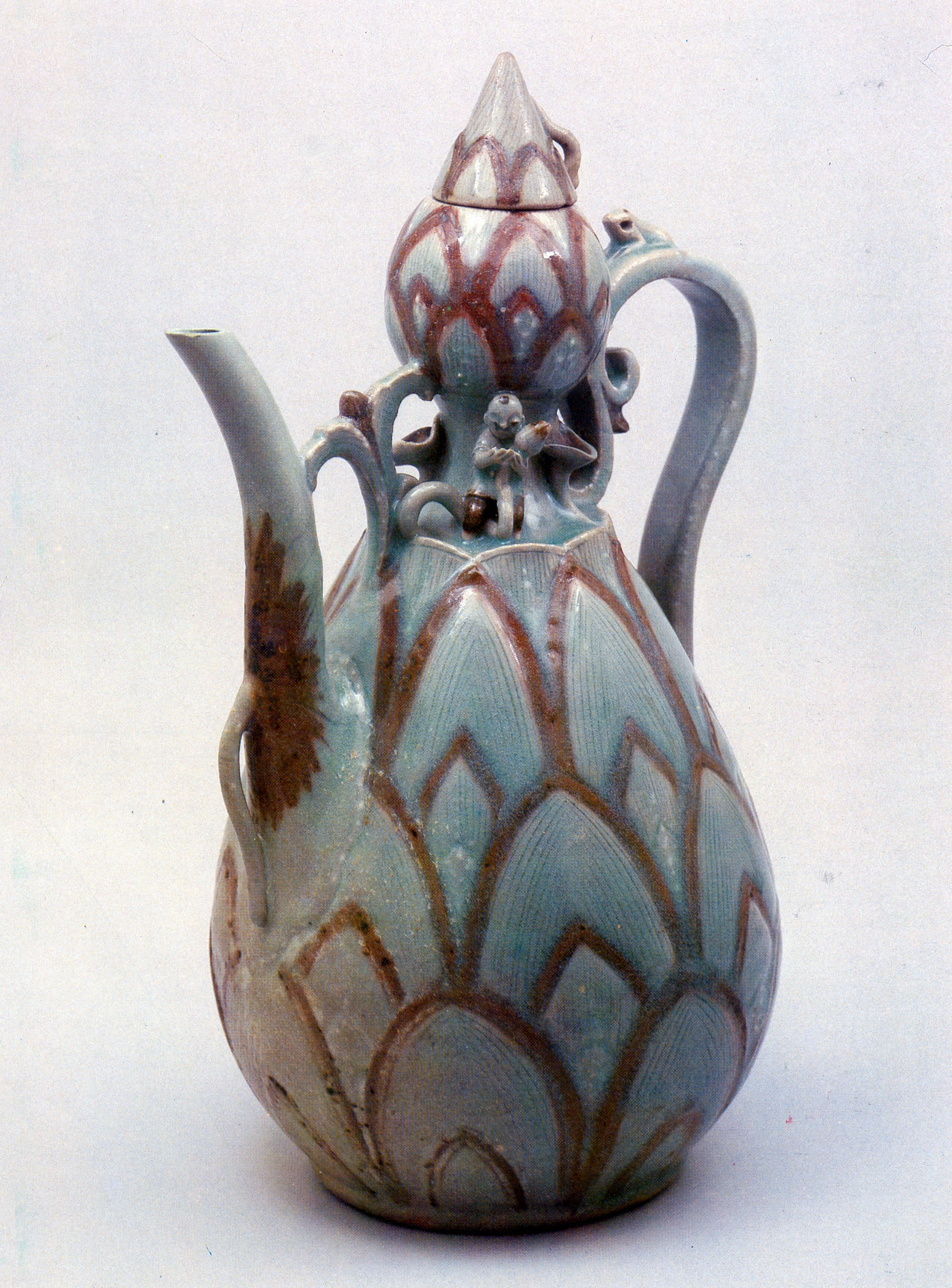
Korean antique teapot

- Brown Betty, a type of British teapot made from red clay, known for being rotund and glazed with brown manganese
- Briq, a teapot and pitcher traditionally used by Lebanese and Syrian Arabs
- Cube teapot, a ruggedized teapot invented for use on ships
- ISO 3103, a description of a standardized method of brewing tea from the International Organization for Standardization
- I'm a Little Teapot, a children's song
- I'm a teapot, HTTP error 418
- Kettle, a type of vessel specialized for boiling and pouring plain water, often metal, also with a spout, sometimes electric
- Tetsubin, Japanese cast iron pot with a spout
- Kyūsu, a Japanese ceramic teapot, often with a side handle
- Samovar, a heated metal container traditionally used to boil water for tea in and around Russia, as well as in other nearby nations, such as Iran and Turkey
- Operation Teapot, a series of fourteen nuclear test explosions conducted at the Nevada Test Site in the first half of 1955
- Pot-holder
- Slop bowl part of a tea set - a bowl to empty tea cups of cooled tea and dregs before refilling with fresh tea
- Sparta Teapot Museum, formerly in Sparta, North Carolina, USA
- Teacup, a small cup with or without a handle from which to drink tea
- Tealight, a small candle originally used to keep a teapot warm
- Tea set, a usually matching set of dishes including a teapot, a small pitcher for milk, and a sugar bowl, for serving tea in a formal manner
- Teaware – Traditional equipment for drinking tea in some cultures
- Teapot Rock, a rock formation in Wyoming
- Utah teapot, a 3D model of a teapot frequently used as a reference object in computer graphics
- Yixing clay teapot, a special Chinese clay teapot
- The pot calling the kettle black, idiom

== Sources ==
- Chow, Kit Boey; Kramer, Ione (1990). "From wine pot to teapot". All the Tea in China. China Books. pp. 66–68. ISBN 978-0-8351-2194-1. OCLC 1024166703.
- Colomban, Philippe; Milande, Véronique (2006). "On-site Raman analysis of the earliest known Meissen porcelain and stoneware". Journal of Raman Spectroscopy. 37 (5): 606–613. Bibcode:2006JRSp...37..606C. doi:10.1002/jrs.1494. eISSN 1097-4555. ISSN 0377-0486.
- Harris, Jonathan (2016). "Handled with care". Furniture History. 52. The Furniture History Society: 51–72. ISSN 0016-3058. JSTOR 26782105.
- Lo, Kuei-Hsiang (1986). The Stonewares of Yixing: From the Ming Period to the Present Day. Hong Kong University Press. p. 18. ISBN 978-962-209-112-2.
- Pettigrew, Jane (2001). A Social History of Tea: Tea's Influence on Commerce, Culture & Community (1 ed.). National Trust. ISBN 978-0-9836106-2-5.
- Pickford, Ian (1997). Antique Silver. Antique Collectors Club. ISBN 9781851492442.
- Ukers, William Harrison (1935). "Evolution of tea-making appliances". All about Tea, Volume 2. Tea and coffee trade journal Company. pp. 436–448. OCLC 1201914.
