= Tea draining tray =

Piece of equipment for the Gongfu tea ceremony

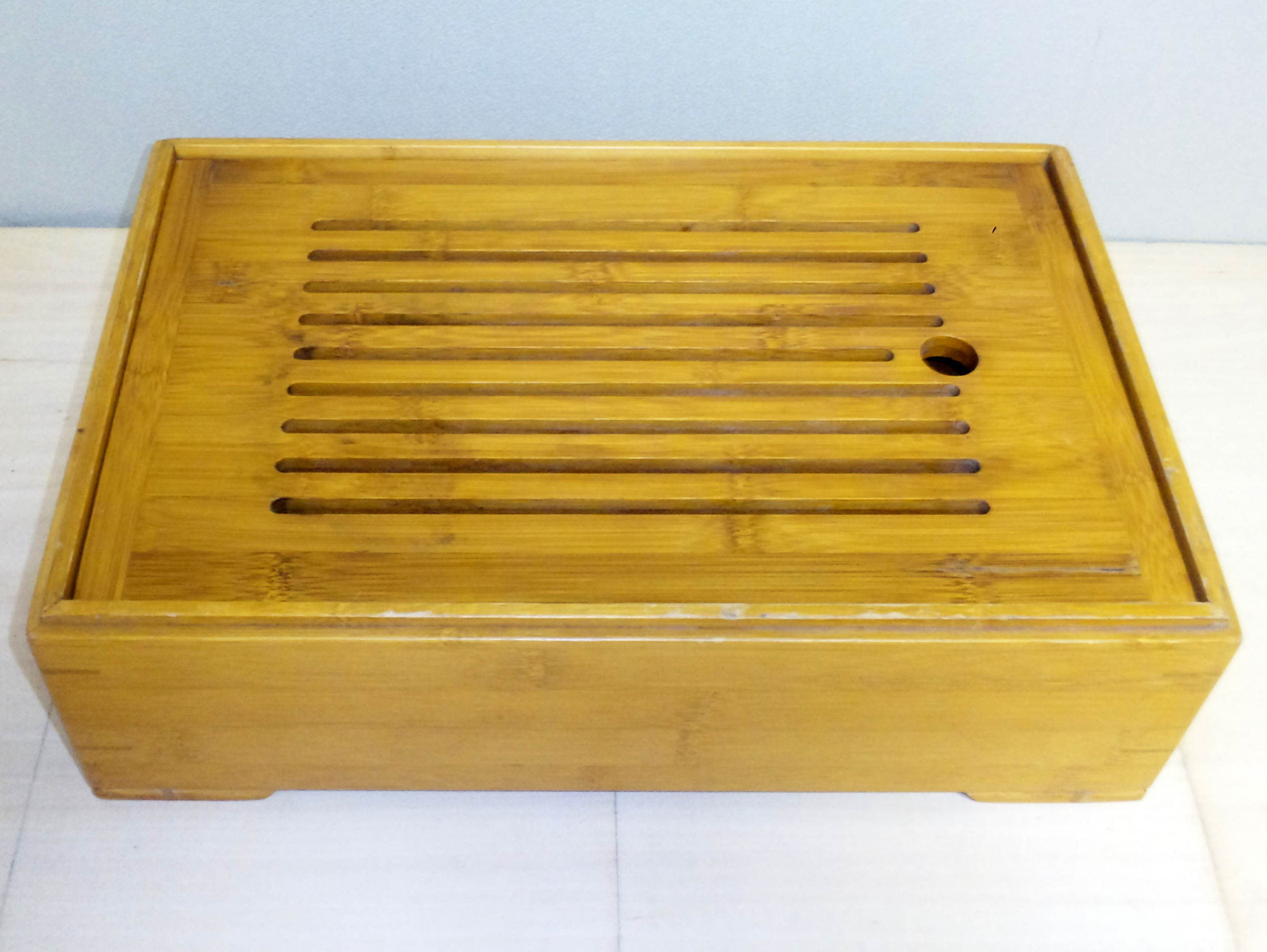

A tea draining tray, tea tray, Gongfu tea tray, or tea sea is an integral piece of equipment for the Gongfu tea ceremony.

It is essentially a grate, which allows excess and waste liquids to be drained away, and either collected in a pan under the grate, or drained away through a hose that carries the waste water and tea to a bucket or other drain.

The Gongfu tea method is used to brew primarily oolong and pu-erh teas. A drain system is especially important with pu-erh teas since the first two pots of tea are usually used to soak the tea, and prime the vessels.

The tray is also important because the Gongfu style of brewing is messy and wet. All the cups, pots and other serving items are repeatedly rinsed in hot water and tea to ensure that proper temperatures are maintained and that the vessels are sanitary, without watering down the tea. When making tea this way, a pot of tea will be brewed 4–10 rounds. Because it is a wet process, the tea draining tray is necessary to keep the process tidy and elegant.

== See also ==
- Teaware
