= Tea leaf grading =

Evaluation of quality and condition of tea leaves

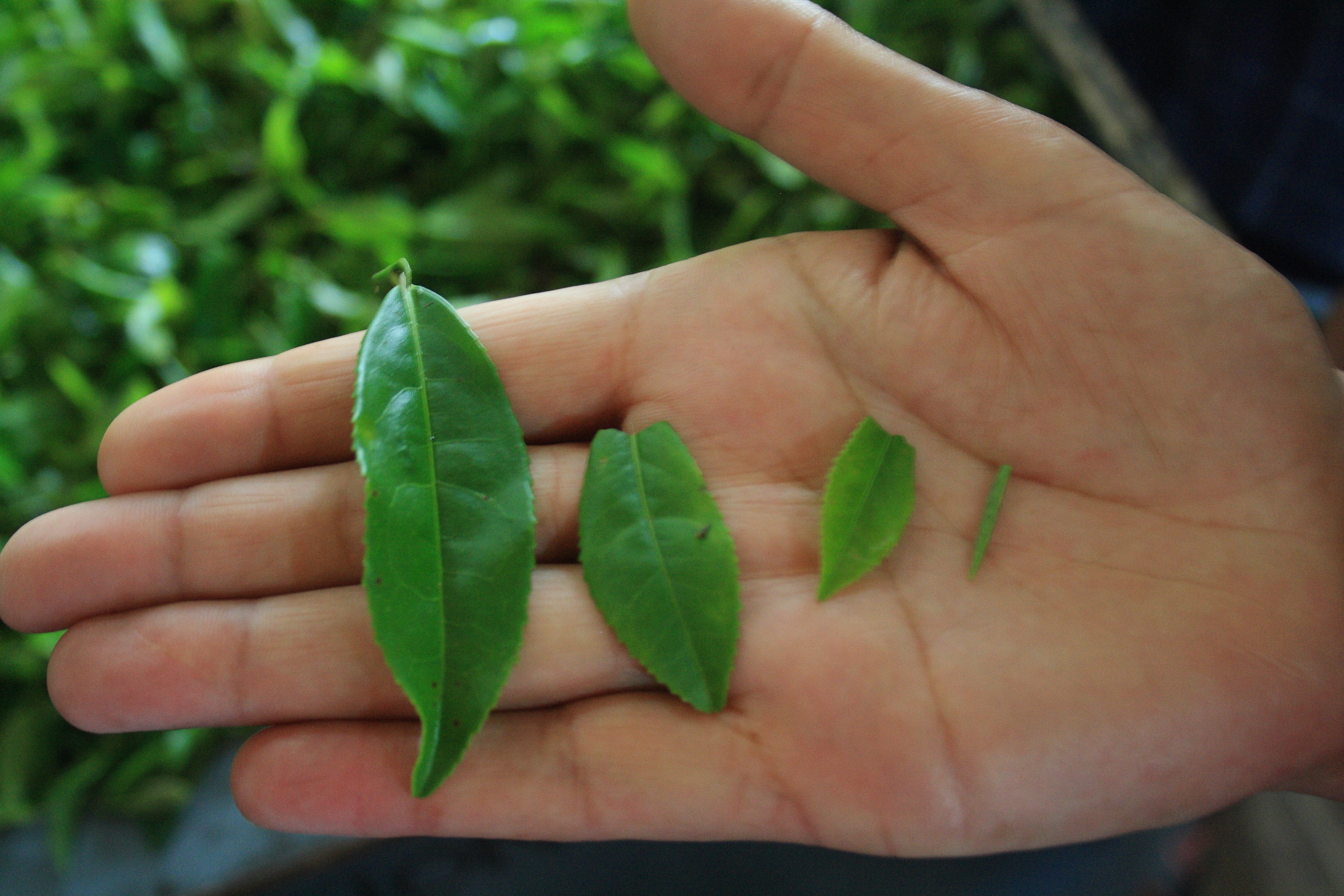
Tea leaves of different sizes just after plucking; value is inversely proportional to size

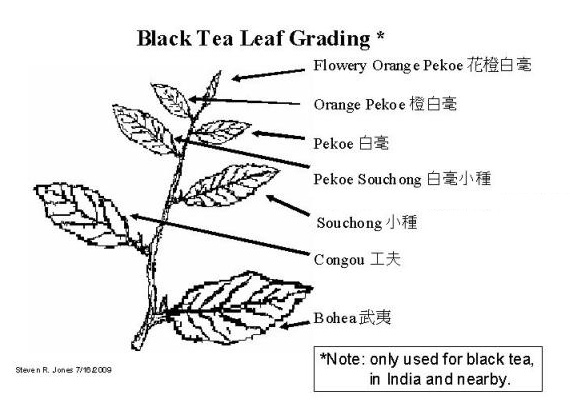
Basic leaf grades of black tea, as used in South Asia

Tea leaf grading is the process of evaluating tea based on the quality and condition of the tea leaves themselves.

The highest quality grades for Western and South Asian teas are the "Orange Pekoe" (abbreviated as "OP") "Whole-leaf grades". The lowest grades are referred to as "Fannings" and "Dust". Pekoe tea grades are classified contingent on various leaf qualities and bud content, each grade determined by how many of the youngest leaves (two, one, or none) adjacent to the leaf bud were picked along with the buds. Top-quality grades consist of only the leaf buds, which are picked using the balls of the fingertips. Fingernails and mechanical tools are not used, to avoid bruising. Certain grades of leaf are better suited to certain varieties of tea. For example, most white tea is processed from the buds or shoots of the tea plant.

When crushed to make bagged teas, the tea is referred to as "broken", as in "broken orange pekoe" ("BOP"). These lower grades include fannings and dust, which are tiny remnants created in the sorting and crushing processes.

The "OP" grade is also subdivided to include categories higher than OP, which are determined primarily by leaf wholeness and size; "TGFOP1" (Tippy Golden Flowery Orange Pekoe, First Grade) is an example of a higher grade of OP.

Broken, fannings and dust orthodox teas ("orthodox tea" meaning the leaves are processed only by traditional methods) have slightly different grades. CTC teas, which consist of leaves rendered to uniform fannings by machine, have yet another grading system.

== General classifications ==
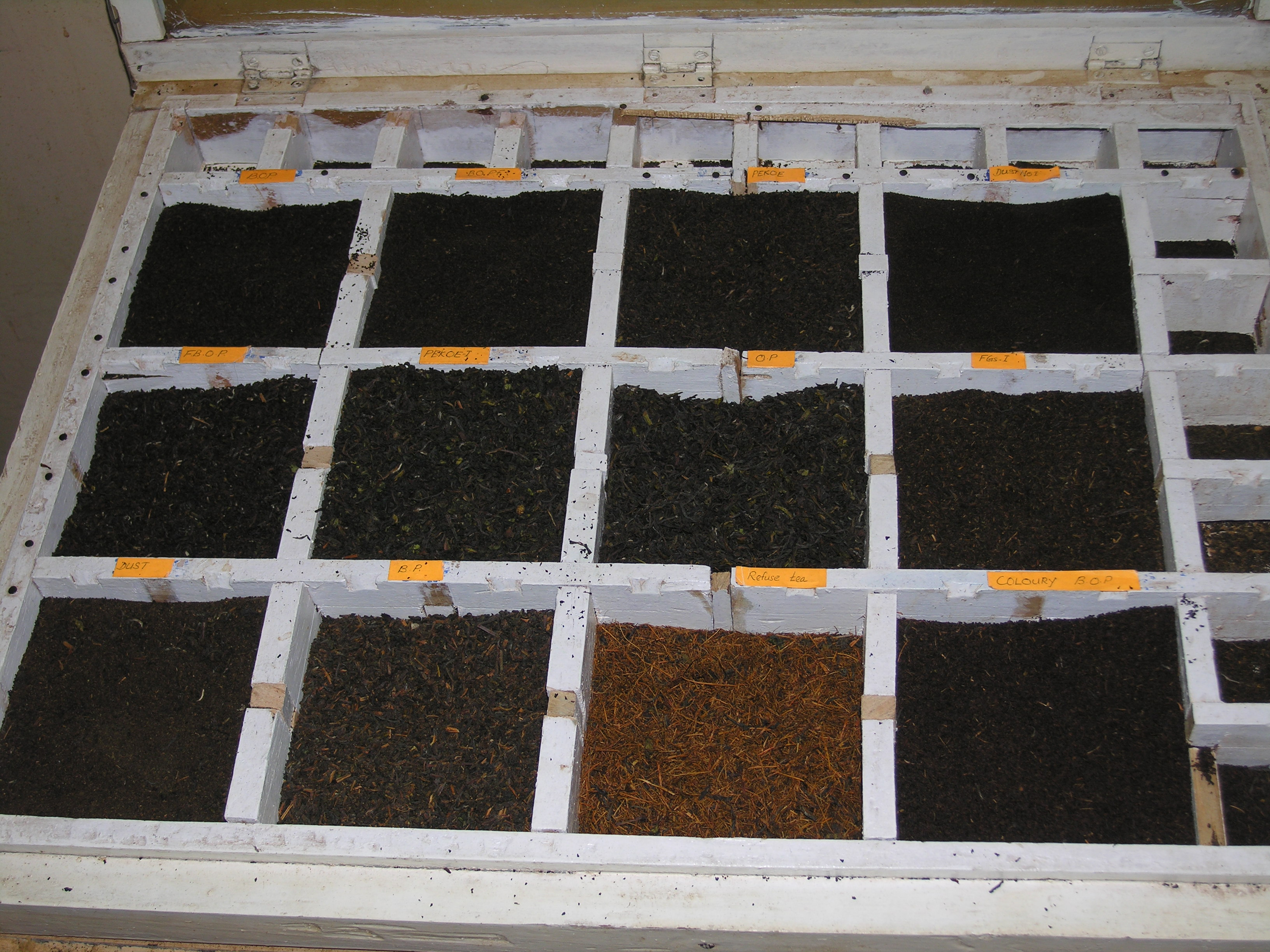
Tray bins of dried tea leaves: O.P. (Orange Pekoe), B.O.P. (Broken Orange Pekoe), and dust-graded black teas at a Sri Lankan tea factory

=== Grading by size ===
Although grading systems vary, the size of the leaf or broken pieces is an essential quality. Size is an important factor how tea is prepared as a beverage. In general, larger leaves or pieces require a longer steeping time. Also, if measured by volume, the larger sizes need more tea to produce the same strength beverage.

=== Grading by appearance ===
Some teas are graded by their appearance. Whole leaves are easier to grade by appearance than broken pieces.

=== Orange Pekoe ===
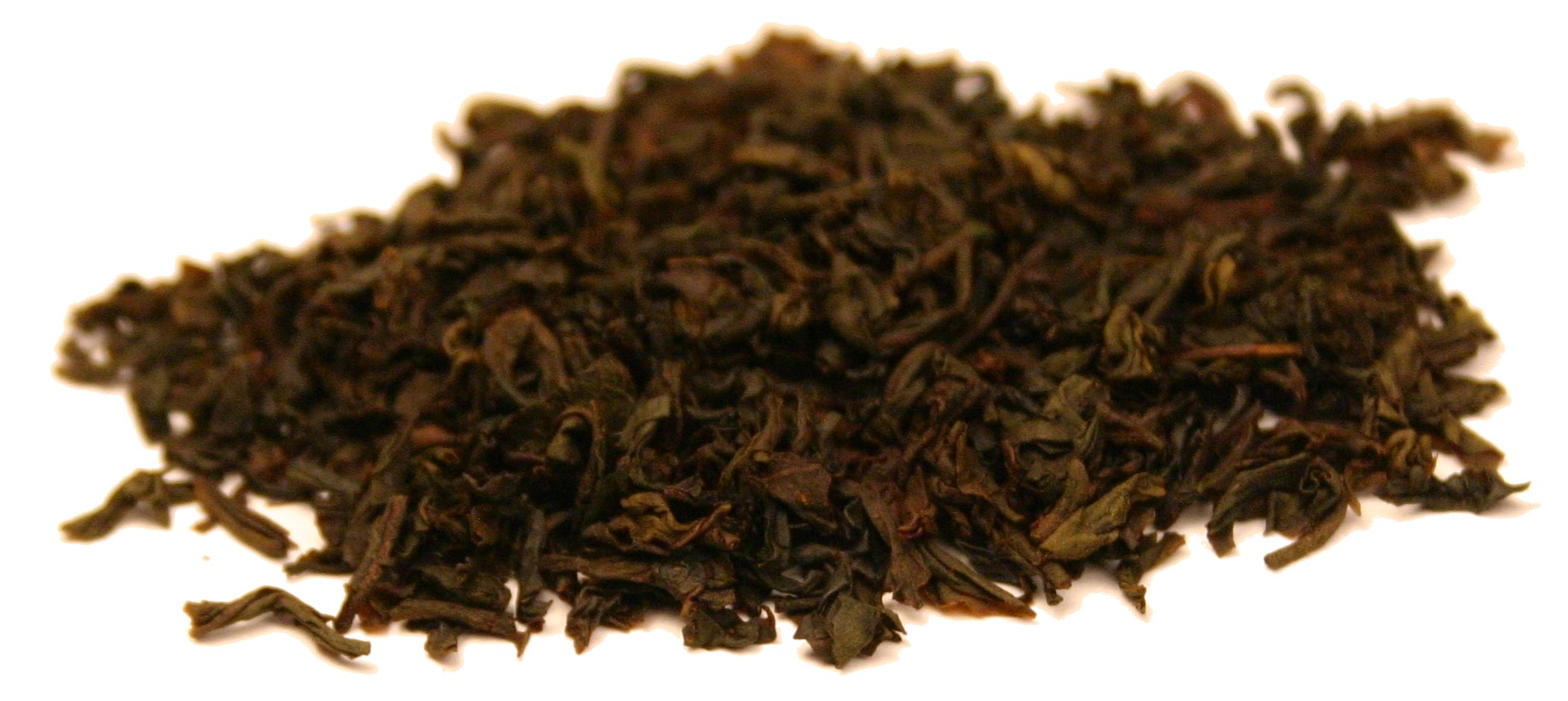
Wilson Ceylon Earl Grey F.B.O.P. (Flowery Broken Orange Pekoe)

Orange Pekoe (/ˈpɛkoʊ, ˈpiːkoʊ/), also spelled pecco, or abbreviated OP, is a term used in the Western tea trade to describe a particular genre of black teas within the Orange Pekoe Grading System, which was originally developped by the Dutch East India Company and then expanded and popularized by the British during their colonial administration of tea plantations in India and Ceylon (today Sri Lanka), to standardize trade and leaf size. Despite a most likely Chinese origin of the word "Pekoe", the term is typically used for teas from Sri Lanka, India and countries other than China and is not generally known within Chinese-speaking countries. The Orange Pekoe Grading System is based upon the size, appearance and quality of processed, dried black-tea leaves.

The tea industry uses the term orange pekoe to describe a basic, medium-grade black tea consisting of many whole tea leaves of a specific size; however, it is popular in some regions (such as North America) to use the term as a description of any generic black tea (though it is often described to the consumer as a specific variety of black tea). Within this system, the teas that receive the highest grades are obtained from new flushes (pickings). This includes the terminal leaf bud along with a few of the youngest leaves. Grading is based on the "size" of the individual leaves and flushes, which is determined by their ability to fall through the screens of special meshes ranging from 8–30 mesh. This also determines the "wholeness", or level of breakage, of each leaf, which is also part of the grading system. Although these are not the only factors used to determine quality, the size and wholeness of the leaves will have the greatest influence on the taste, clarity, and brewing time of the tea.

When used outside the context of black-tea grading, the term "pekoe" (or, occasionally, orange pekoe) describes the unopened terminal leaf bud (tips) in tea flushes. As such, the phrases "a bud and a leaf" or "a bud and two leaves" are used to describe the "leafiness" of a flush; they are also used interchangeably with pekoe and a leaf or pekoe and two leaves.

==== Etymology "Pekoe" and "Orange" ====
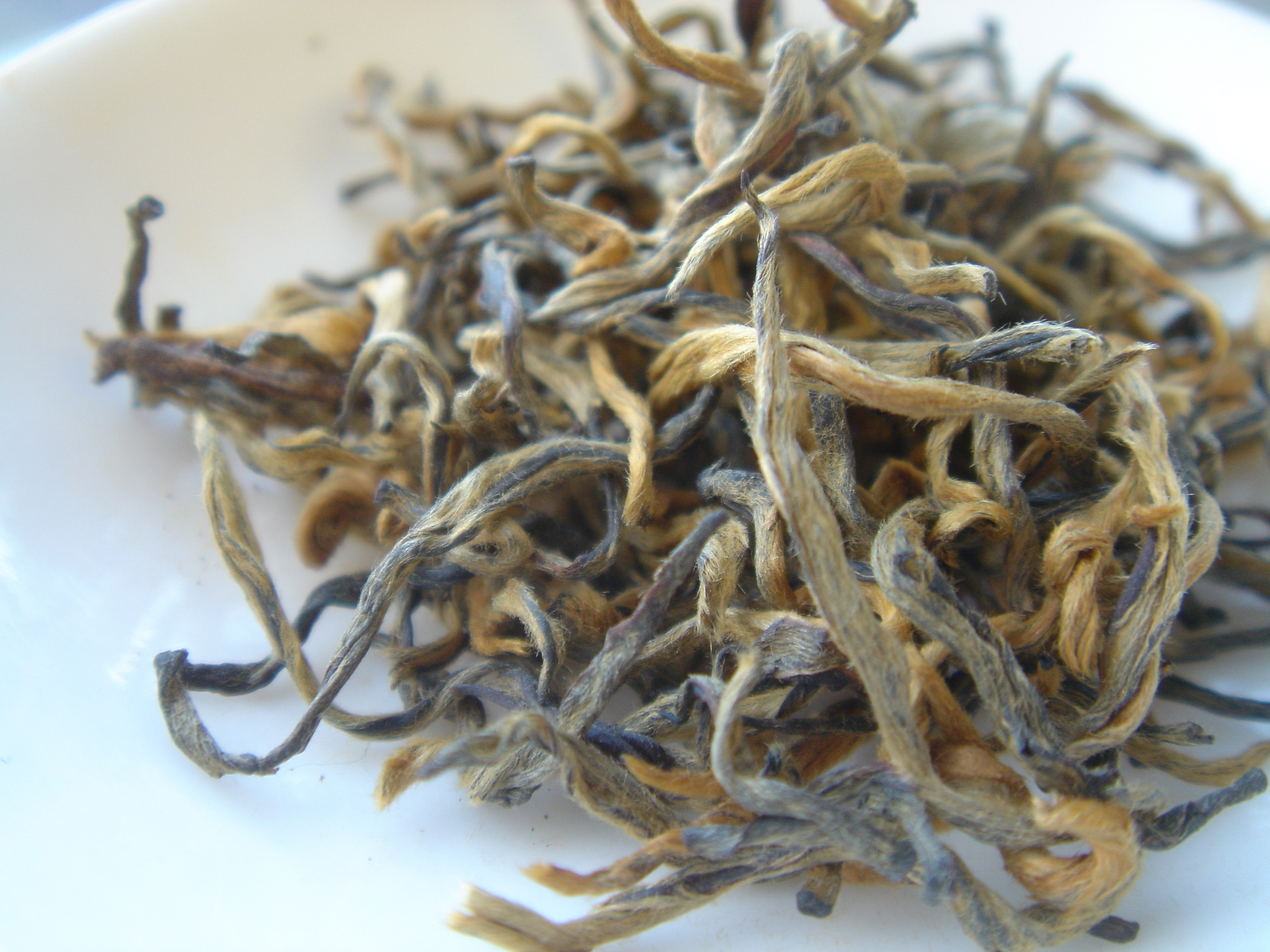
A black tea with white Trichomes (hair) plainly visible on its surface

The origin of the word "pekoe" is uncertain. One explanation is that it is derived from the mispronunciation of the transliterated Amoy (Xiamen) dialect word for "white down / hair" (Chinese: 白毫; Pe̍h-ōe-jī: pe̍h-ho), which refers to the down-like white trichomes (velvety fuzz / hair) covering the leaf buds and the youngest leaves of the tea plant, regardless of how the tea is eventually processed, i.e. "Black", "Oolong", "Green", "White" (generally minimally processed). This is how "pekoe" is listed by Rev. Robert Morrison (1782–1834) in his Chinese dictionary (1819) as one of the seven sorts of black tea "commonly known by Europeans".. Another hypothesis is that the term derives from the Chinese word báihuā for "white flower" (Chinese: 白花; pinyin: báihuā; Pe̍h-ōe-jī: pe̍h-hoe) which refers to a certain content of whitish trichome covered leaf buds and youngest leaves in higher quality "Pekoe", or rather "Orange Pekoe" teas.

Sir Thomas Lipton, the 19th-century British tea magnate, is widely credited with popularizing, if not inventing, the term "Orange Pekoe", which seems to have no Chinese precedent, in Western markets at least. The "Orange" in Orange Pekoe is sometimes mistaken to mean the tea has been flavoured with orange, orange oils, or is otherwise associated with the fruit, which, however, has no relation to the tea or its flavor. There are two explanations for its meaning, though neither definitive:

1. The Dutch House of Orange-Nassau, the royal family since 1815, had long been the most respected aristocratic family of the Dutch Republic. The Dutch East India Company played a central role in bringing tea to Europe and may have marketed the tea as "Orange" to suggest an association with the House of Orange.
2. Colour: the coppery colour of a high-quality, oxidized leaf before drying, or the orange hues in the dark, dried leaves in the finished tea, may be related to the name. These leaves usually consist of the leaf bud and the first two leaves, all covered in fine, downy-white hair. The orange colour appears when the tea is fully oxidized.

=== Fannings ===
Fannings are small pieces of tea that are left over after higher grades of teas are gathered to be sold. Traditionally these were treated as the rejects of the manufacturing process in making high-quality leaf tea like the orange pekoe. Fannings with extremely small particles are graded "Dust" (See "Dust grades" below). Fannings and dusts are considered the lowest grades of tea, separated from broken-leaf teas which have larger pieces of the leaves. However, the fannings of expensive teas can still be more expensive and more flavourful than whole leaves of cheaper teas.

This traditionally low-quality tea has, however, experienced a huge demand in the developing world in the last century as the practice of tea drinking became popular. Tea stalls in India and the South Asian sub-continent and Africa prefer dust tea because it is cheap and also produces a very strong brew; consequently, more cups are obtained per measure of tea dust.

Because of the small size of the particles, a tea infuser is typically used to brew fannings. Fannings are also typically used in most tea bags, although some companies sell tea bags containing whole-leaf tea.

Some exporters focus primarily on broken-leaf teas, fannings, and dusts.

== Grades ==
Choppy contains many leaves of various sizes. Fannings are small particles of tea leaves used almost exclusively in tea bags. Flowery consists of large leaves, typically plucked in the second or third flush with an abundance of tips. Golden flowery includes very young tips or buds (usually golden in colour) that were picked early in the season. Tippy includes an abundance of tips.

=== Whole-leaf grades ===
Grade	Description
OP	Orange Pekoe Main grade, consisting of long wiry leaves without tips.
OP1	More delicate than OP; long, wiry leaf with a light liquor.
OPA	Bolder than OP; long leaf tea which ranges from tightly wound to almost open.
OPS	Orange Pekoe Superior Primarily from Indonesia; similar to OP.
FOP	Flowery Orange Pekoe High-quality tea with a long leaf and few tips, considered the second grade in Assam, Dooars, and Bangladesh teas. Due to differences in tea picking methods and grading there is no equivalence to most appellation-specific grades in China.
FOP1	Limited to only the highest quality leaves in the FOP classification.
GFOP	Golden Flowery Orange Pekoe Higher proportion of tip than FOP. Top grade in the Milima and Marinyn regions, but uncommon in Assam and Darjeeling.
TGFOP	Tippy Golden Flowery Orange Pekoe The highest proportion of tip, and the main grade in Nepal, Darjeeling and Assam.
TGFOP1	Limited to only the highest quality leaves in the TGFOP classification.
FTGFOP	Finest Tippy Golden Flowery Orange Pekoe Highest quality grade.
FTGFOP1; STGFOP; SFTGFOP	Special Finest Tippy Golden Flowery Orange Pekoe Limited to only the highest quality leaves in the FTGFOP classification.

=== Broken leaf grades ===
Grade	Description
BT	Broken Tea Usually a black, open, fleshy leaf that is very bulky. This classification is used in Sumatra, Ceylon (Sri Lanka), and some parts of Southern India.
BP	Broken Pekoe The most common broken pekoe grade; from Indonesia, Ceylon (Sri Lanka), Assam and Southern India.
BPS	Broken Pekoe Souchong Term for broken pekoe in the Assam and Darjeeling regions.
FP	Flowery Pekoe High-quality pekoe. Usually coarser with a fleshier, broken leaf. Produced in Ceylon (Sri Lanka) and Southern India, as well as in some parts of Kenya.
BOP	Broken Orange Pekoe Main broken grade. Prevalent in Assam, Ceylon (Sri Lanka), Southern India, Java, and China.
FBOP	Flowery Broken Orange Pekoe Coarser and broken with some tips. From Assam, Ceylon (Sri Lanka), Indonesia, China, and Bangladesh. In South America, coarser, black broken.
FBOPF	Finest Broken Orange Pekoe Flowery Mainly a Ceylon (Sri Lanka) tea labeling, it designates finest Broken Orange Pekoe with a high proportion of tips, coming from Sri Lanka's low districts. The "F" at the end of the grade acronym stands here for "Flowery", not "Fannings", as one would expect, and refers to the "flowery flavour" of the tea.
GBOP	Golden Broken Orange Pekoe Second grade tea with uneven leaves and few tips.
GFBOP1	Golden Flowery Broken Orange Pekoe 1 As above, but with only the highest quality leaves in the GFBOP classification.
TGFBOP1	Tippy Golden Flowery Broken Orange Pekoe 1 High-quality leaves with a high proportion of tips; finest broken First Grade Leaves in Darjeeling and some parts of Assam.

=== Fannings grades ===
Grade	Description
PF	Pekoe Fannings
OF	Orange Fannings From northern India and some parts of Africa and South America as well as Nepal .
FOF	Flowery Orange Fannings Common in Assam, Dooars, Nepal and Bangladesh. Some leaf sizes come close to the smaller broken grades.
GFOF	Golden Flowery Orange Fannings Finest grade in Darjeeling for tea bag production.
TGFOF	Tippy Golden Flowery Orange Fannings
BOPF	Broken Orange Pekoe Fannings Main grade in Sri Lanka, Indonesia, Nepal, Southern India, Kenya, Mozambique, Bangladesh, and China. Black CTC-tea with few added ingredients, uniform particle size (CTC-pellets), containing no tips.

=== Dust grades ===
Grade	Description
D1	Dust 1 From Sri Lanka, Indonesia, China, Africa, South America, Southern India, and Bangladesh.
PD	Pekoe Dust
PD1	Pekoe Dust 1 Mainly produced in India.

=== Other terms ===
- Musc. – Muscatel
- Cl. – Clonal
- Ch. – China varietal
- Qu. – Queen jat
- FBOPF Ex. Spl. – Finest Broken Orange Pekoe Flowery (Extra Special)
- FP – Flowery Pekoe
- PS – Pekoe Souchong
- S – Souchong
- BOF – Broken Orange Fannings
- BPF – Broken Pekoe Fannings
- RD – Pekoe Dust / Red Dust
- FD – Fine Dust
- GD – Golden Dust
- SRD – Super Red Dust
- SFD – Super Fine Dust
- BMF – Broken Mixed Fannings

== See also ==
- Food grading
- ISO 3103, a standardized method of tea brewing used to compare tea leaf flavor and aroma characteristics
- Tea blending and additives
