= Tea bag =

Small sealed bag or packet containing tea leaves

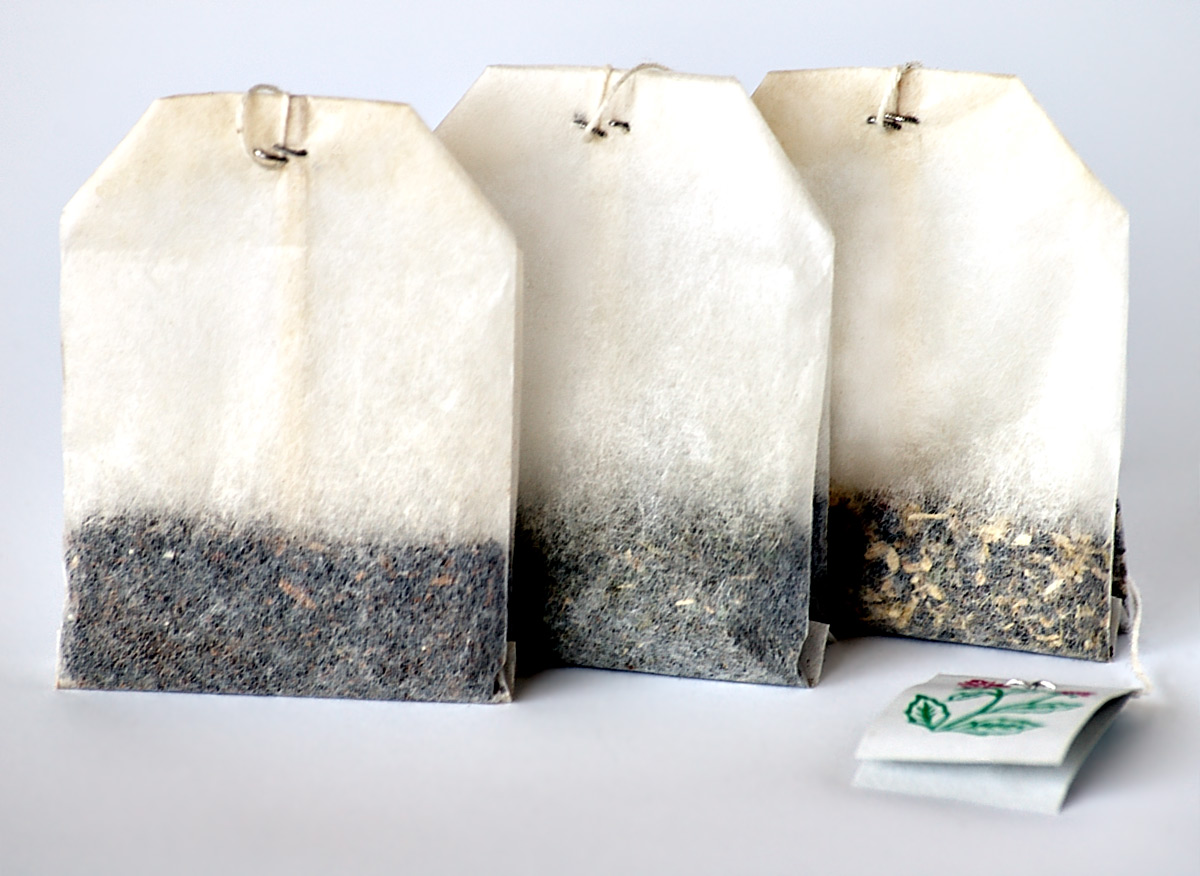
Commonly shaped tea bags

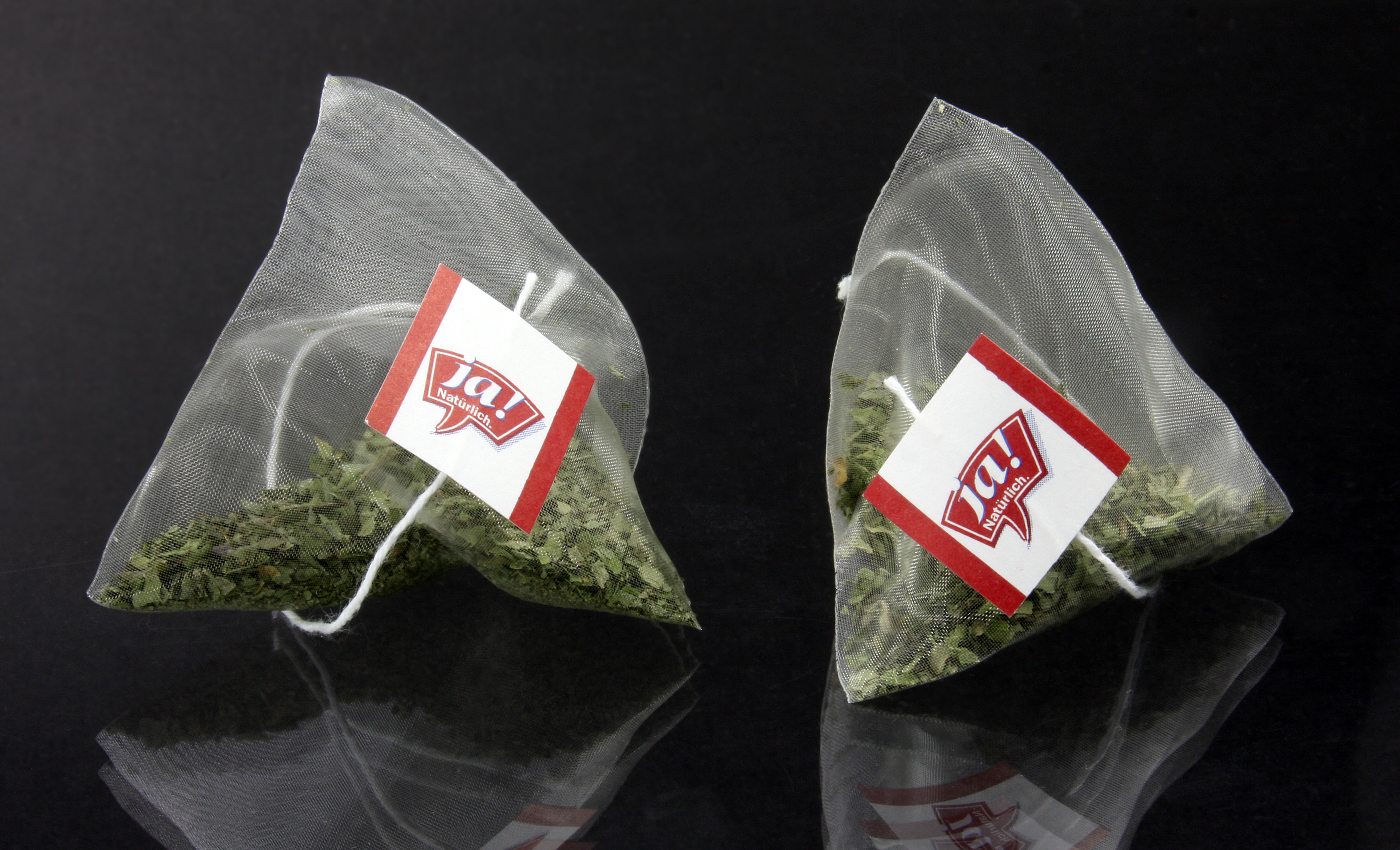
Tetrahedron-shaped tea bags made of polylactide (PLA), a bioplastic, shown here containing dried peppermint leaves

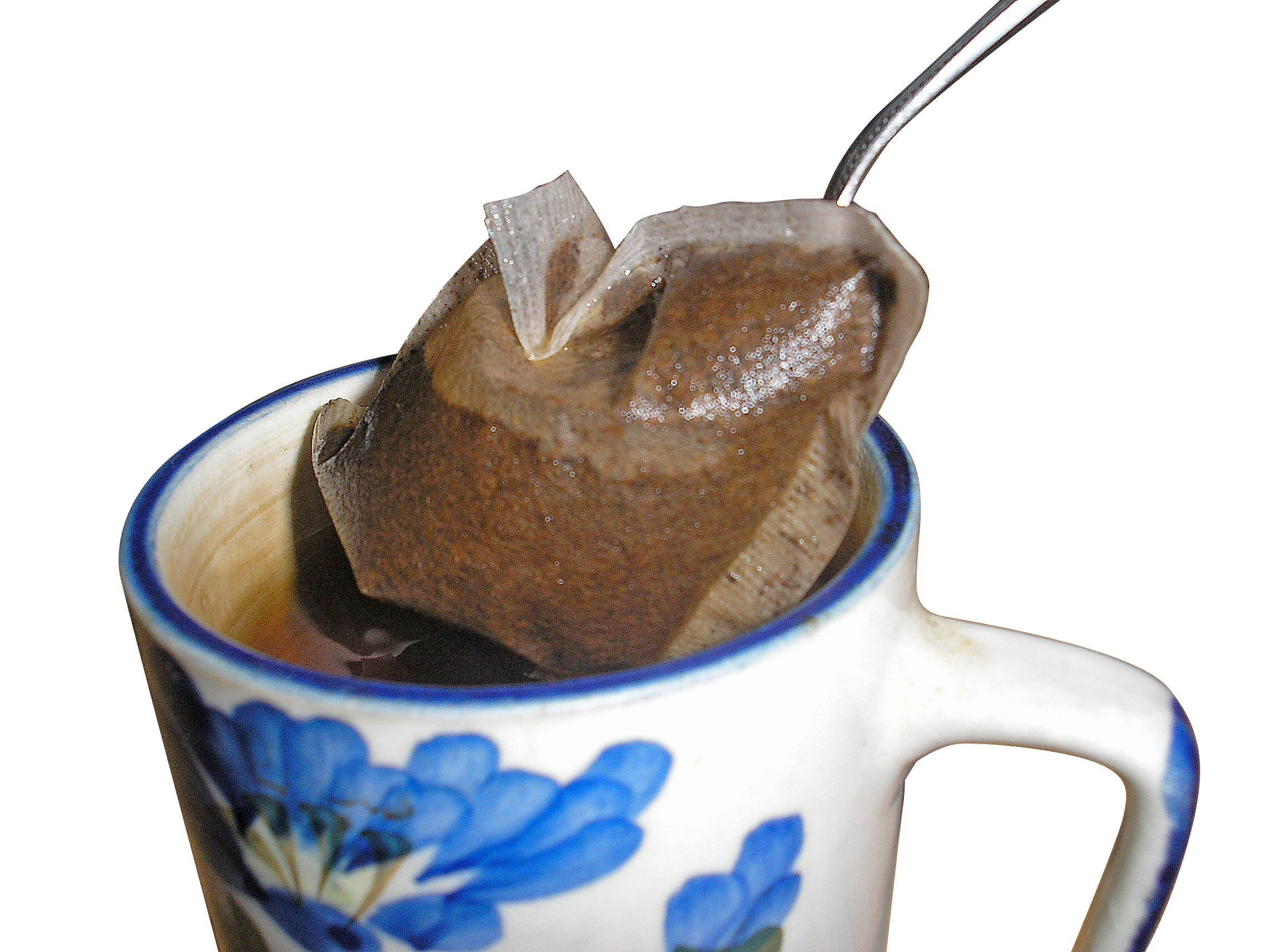
A tea bag being removed from a mug to stop the brewing process

A tea bag (also spelled teabag) is a small, porous, sealed bag or packet typically containing tea leaves (Camellia sinensis) or the leaves of other herbs, which is immersed in water to steep and make an infusion. Originally used only for making tea, they are now made for other tisanes (herbal "teas") as well.

Tea bags are commonly made of filter paper or food-grade plastic, or occasionally of silk cotton or silk. The tea bag performs the same function as a tea infuser. Some tea bags have an attached piece of string with a paper label at the top that assists in removing the bag, while also displaying the brand or variety of tea. There are also special tea filters that can be used to pour loose tea into and brew it in a bag in a cup.

== History ==
Tea bag patents date from 1903, when Roberta Lawson and Mary McLaren, of Milwaukee, Wisconsin, were granted US patent 723287 for a Tea Leaf Holder, which they had filed in 1901. The first modern tea bags were hand-sewn fabric bags. Appearing commercially around 1904, tea bags were successfully marketed in about 1908 by Thomas Sullivan, a tea and coffee importer from New York, who shipped his silk tea bags around the world. A popular legend states that this was accidental; the loose tea was intended to be removed from the bags by customers, but they found it easier to brew the tea with the tea leaves still enclosed in the porous bags. The first automatic tea bag packing machine, Pompadour, was invented in 1929 by Adolf Rambold for the German company Teekanne. Pompadour could produce 35 gauze tea bag per minute. In 1949, Adolf Rambold created the Constanta machine to produce dual- chamber tea bags. Constanta worked by forming the fabric into a tube shape to hold two tea leaf portions then cutting it into sections. These sections will move into a rotating wheel by the mechanical arm to fold the section's bottom then a fixed guided press will seal each section into double chamber tea bag. Constanta allows the tea bag to be shaped and sealed into the double chamber tea bag so the water can flow better allowing the tea to develop its full flavor.

Constanta can produce 160 double chamber tea bags per minute. In 1990, Constanta upgraded to Perfecta, which can produce up to 400 double chamber bags per minute.

The heat-sealed paper fiber tea bag was patented in 1930 by William Hermanson. The now-common rectangular tea bag was not invented until 1944. Prior to that, tea bags resembled small sacks.

== Production ==
=== Teas ===
A broad variety of teas as well as other infusions, like herbal teas, are available in tea bags. Typically, tea bags use fannings, the left-overs after larger leaf pieces are gathered for sale as loose tea, but some companies sell teabags containing whole-leaf tea.

=== Shapes and material ===
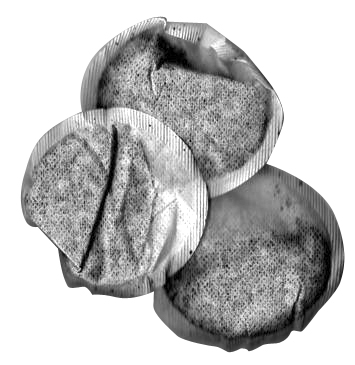
Circular tea bags

Microscopic view of a synthetic tea bag

Traditionally, tea bags have been square or rectangular in shape. They are usually made of filter paper, a blend of wood and vegetable fibers related to paper found in milk and coffee filters. The latter is bleached pulp abaca hemp, a plantation banana plant grown for its fiber, mostly in the Philippines and Colombia. Some bags have a heat-sealable thermoplastic such as PVC or polypropylene as a component fiber on the inner tea bag surface, making them not fully biodegradable. Some newer paper tea bags are made in a circular shape.

Tetrahedral tea bags were introduced by the PG Tips brand in 1997. They are typically made of nylon, soilon (PLA mesh made from corn starch), or silk. Nylon is non-biodegradable, so silk is preferred by environmentalists. PLA on the other hand is biodegradable, but is not compostable.

Empty tea bags are also available for consumers to fill with tea leaves themselves. These are typically open-ended pouches with long flaps. The pouch is filled with an appropriate quantity of leaf tea and the flap is closed into the pouch to retain the tea. Such tea bags combine the ease of use of a commercially produced tea bag with the wider tea choice and better quality control of loose leaf tea.

==== Plastics ====
In 2017, Mike Armitage, a gardener in Wrexham, UK, found that tea bags left a plastic residue after being composted. He started a petition urging Unilever to remove plastic from bag production. In January 2018, Co-op Food announced that they were removing plastic from their own brand 99 tea bags in conjunction with their supplier Typhoo. In February 2018, PG Tips announced that their pyramid bags would now use corn starch adhesive in place of polypropylene.

Microplastics may be found in the tea meant for human consumption. A 2019 study showed that "steeping a single plastic teabag at brewing temperature (95 °C; 203 °F) releases approximately 11.6 billion microplastics and 3.1 billion nanoplastics into a single cup of the beverage". A 2021 study analyzed purportedly cellulose tea bags and found that 15 of the 22 bags tested also contained polyester, polyethylene or polypropylene, which are known to shed microplastic fibers. Although cellulose is considered to be biodegradable, the plastic components are not and release microplastics to the environment when composted.

== Recreational and practical applications ==
Decorative tea bags have become the basis for large collections and many collectors collect tea bags from around the world. Tea bag collector clubs are widely spread around the world and members consist of people interested in items related to teas. Online collector clubs often include catalogs of tea bags, as well as collection tracking tools. In addition, tea bag collectors often collect other tea-related items such as labels. These websites also provide forums for discussions and trade arrangements between collectors.

Teabag folding began in the Netherlands and is often credited to Tiny van der Plas. It is a form of origami in which identical squares of patterned paper (cut from the front of tea bag wrappers) are folded, and then arranged in rosettes. These rosettes are usually used to decorate gift cards, and it has become a popular craft in both the US and UK since 2000.

Soil scientists have used standardized tea bags to measure the decomposition rate of organic materials in different soils.

== See also ==
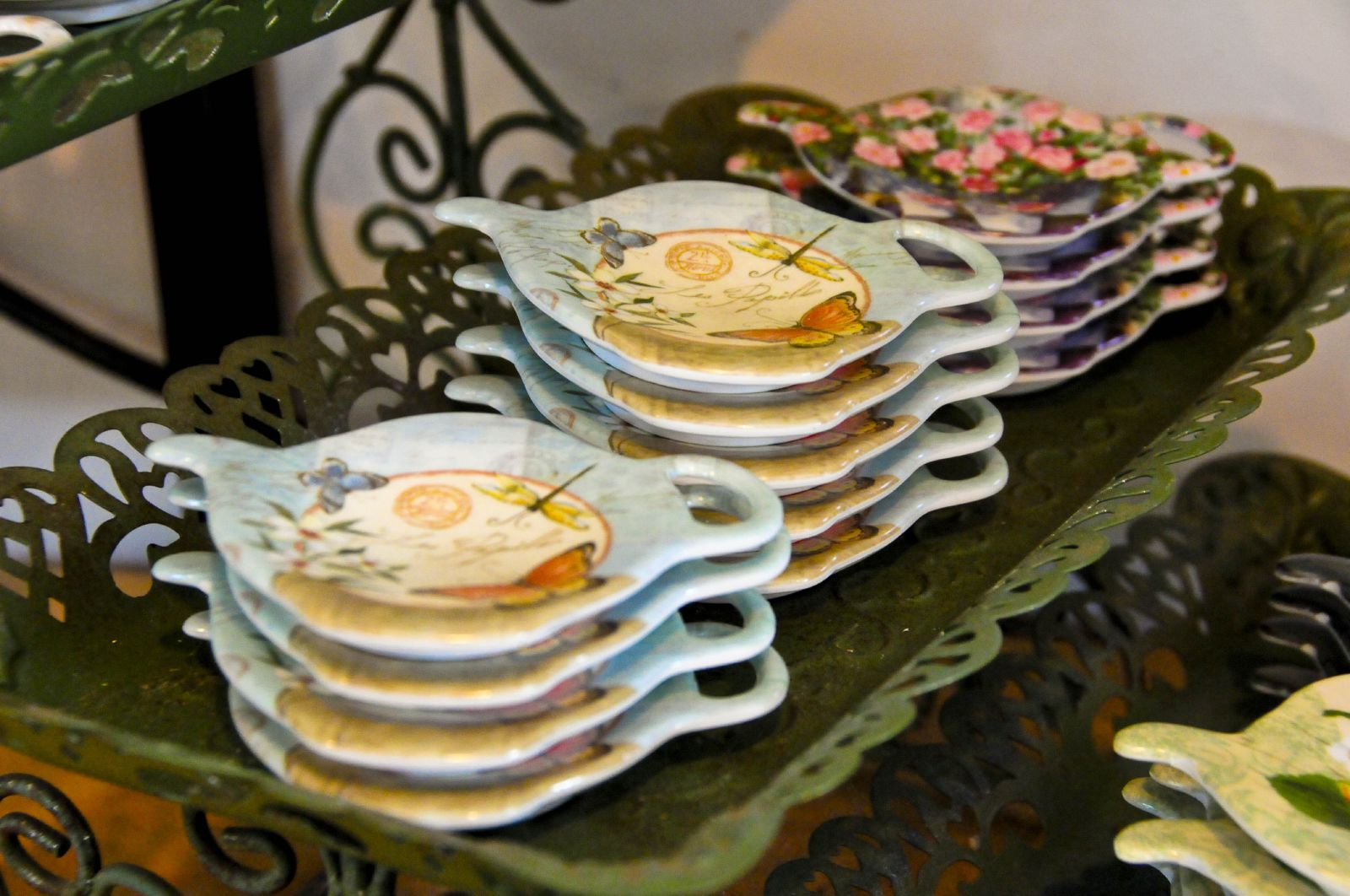
Piles of tea bag holders

- 3-MCPD, a chemical compound that is carcinogenic, and can occur in some resin-reinforced tea bag materials
- Builder's tea, a variety of strong black tea typically prepared by steeping a tea bag in a mug
- Melitta 401 and Melitta 402 tea filters
- Tea leaf grading
- Tea strainer, a small mesh utensil that can filter out stray tea leaves when whole-leaf tea is poured from a teapot
- Tetley, the British tea company that introduced tea bags in the United Kingdom in 1953
