= Brown Betty (teapot) =

Type of teapot

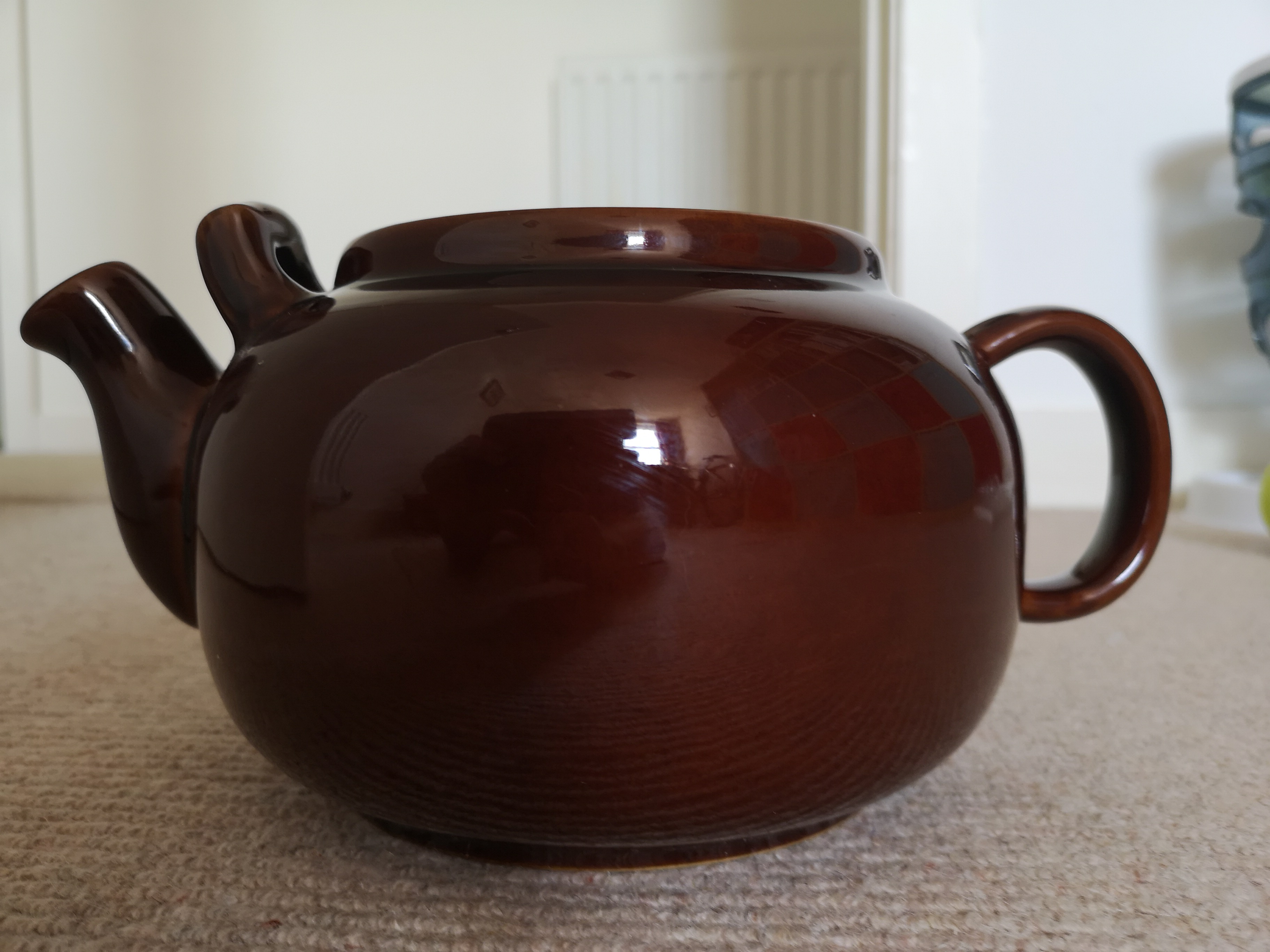
"Brown Betty" teapot made by Joseph Bourne & Son Ltd

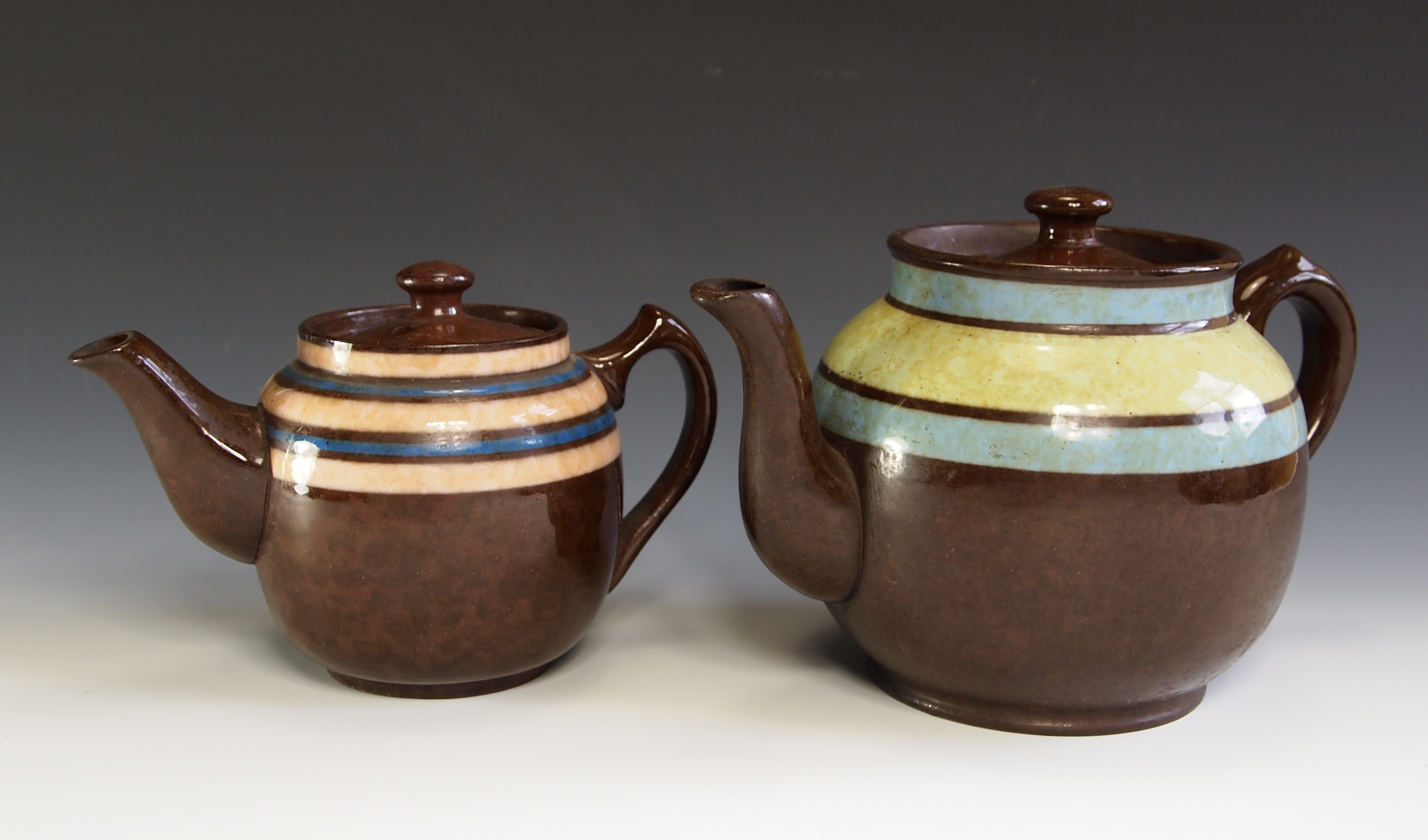
"Brown Betty" teapots made by James Sadler and Sons Ltd

A Brown Betty is a type of teapot, round and with a manganese brown glaze known as Rockingham glaze.

The original teapots came from a red clay that was discovered in the Stoke-on-Trent area of Britain, in 1695. This clay resulted in a ceramic which seemed to retain heat better and so found use as the material for the teapot as early as the seventeenth century. These early pots were tall and shaped more like coffee pots. In the nineteenth century the pots began to take on the more rounded shape of the modern Brown Betty. The Rockingham Glaze was brushed on the pot and allowed to run down the sides, creating a streaky finish as it was fired.

In the Victorian era, when tea was at its peak of popularity, tea brewed in the Brown Betty was considered excellent. This was attributed to the design of the pot which allowed the tea leaves more freedom to swirl around as the water was poured into the pot, releasing more flavour with less bitterness.

== See also ==
- Tea in the United Kingdom
