= Infuser =

Tea leaf holder for steeping; not a bag

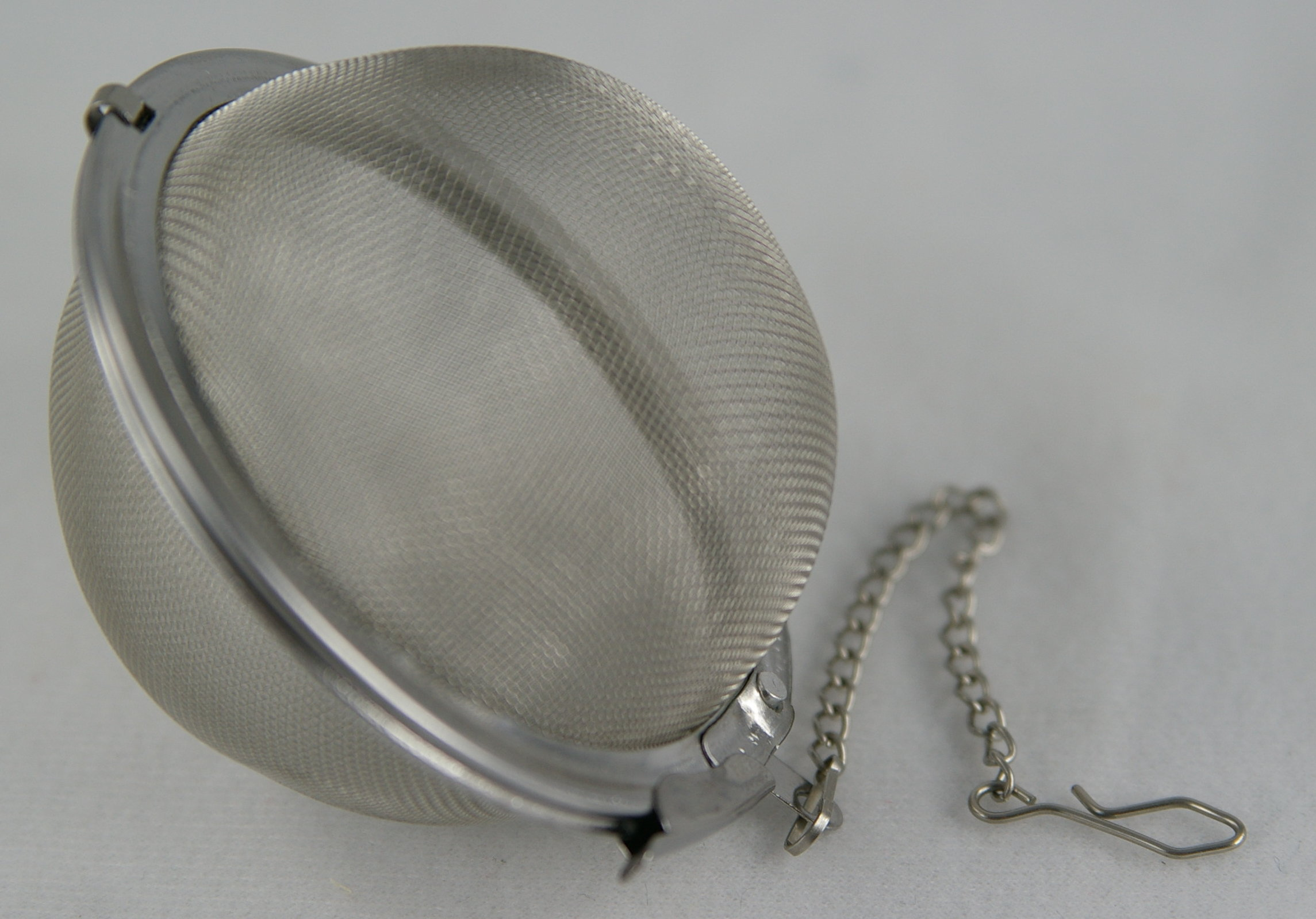
A cheap generic mesh tea infuser ball

A tea infuser is a device in which loose, dried tea leaves are placed for steeping or brewing, in a mug or a teapot full of hot water. It is often called a teaball, tea maker or tea egg. The tea infuser gained popularity in the first half of the 19th century. Tea infusers enable one to easily steep tea from fannings and broken leaf teas.

== Use ==
A tea infuser performs a similar function as a tea bag, a later American invention. The infuser is generally a small mesh, perforated metal container, or covered spoon that holds tea leaves, in varying sizes, to steep single or multiple servings at once. Common shapes of infusers include spherical, conical and cylindrical. One style of infuser is a split sphere with tong-like handles to open its mesh container.

The infuser is placed in a cup or pot of hot or boiling water, allowing the tea to brew without loose tea leaves spilling into the pot or cup. A rod or chain is may be attached to the container of the infuser to simplify retrieval from the pot or cup. Infusers with large holes may not catch all the leaves, requiring the use of a tea strainer to remove the remaining pieces.

=== Alternative use ===
==== Quick water imbibition ====
Water imbibition takes half the time for material that floats with half its area above the water surface when they are submerged with an infuser.

Seeds are often pre-treated before sowing in order to verify that they will sprout. Imbibition of water through the membrane of the seed shell is the first step in the germination process in most seeds. Seeds can be submerged with an infuser, including hot water scarification treatment for tolerant species. Seeds can be weighed with a milligram scale before and after they have been submerged to find out when they don't need to be exposed to more water imbibition. Floating seeds can be inspected when they have to sink inside mesh infusers submerged in transparent containers by shaking them. Seeds who don't absorb water will not germinate and must be modified with further scarification.

Also, hot water treatment at 90 °C for 90 seconds followed by dip in cold water for 30 seconds can be an effective seed decontamination method against escherichia coli O157:H7 and salmonella.

== Types ==
=== Ball ===
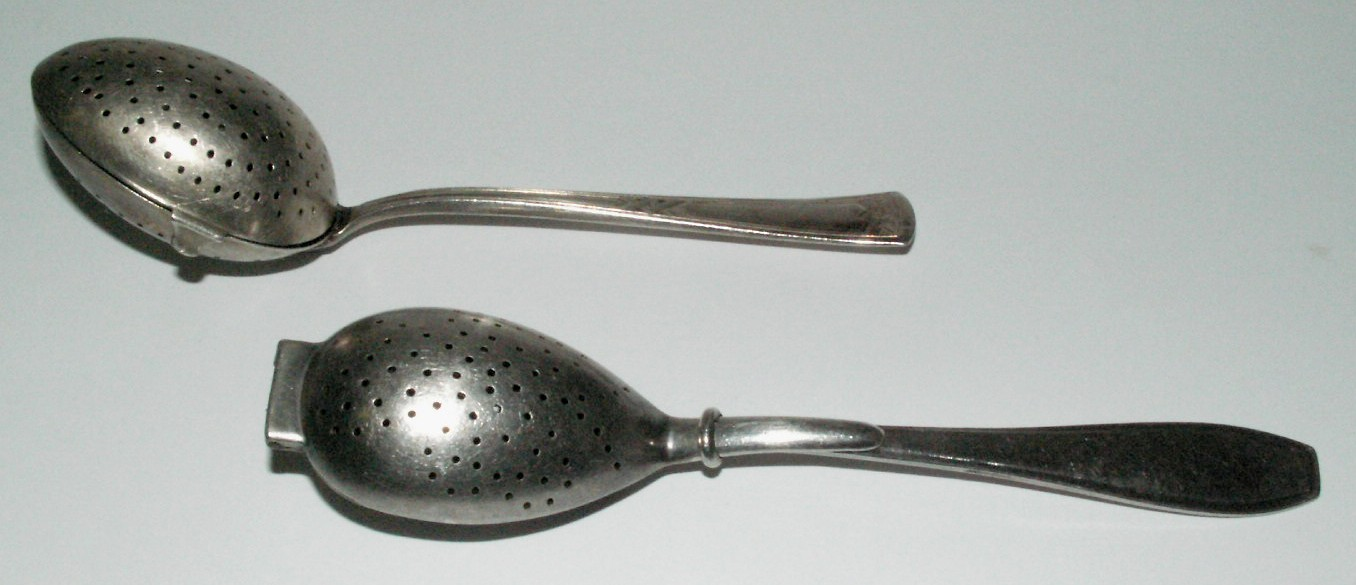
Tea-making spoons

Ball infusers are removed along with the tea leaves from the pot.

==== Snap ball ====
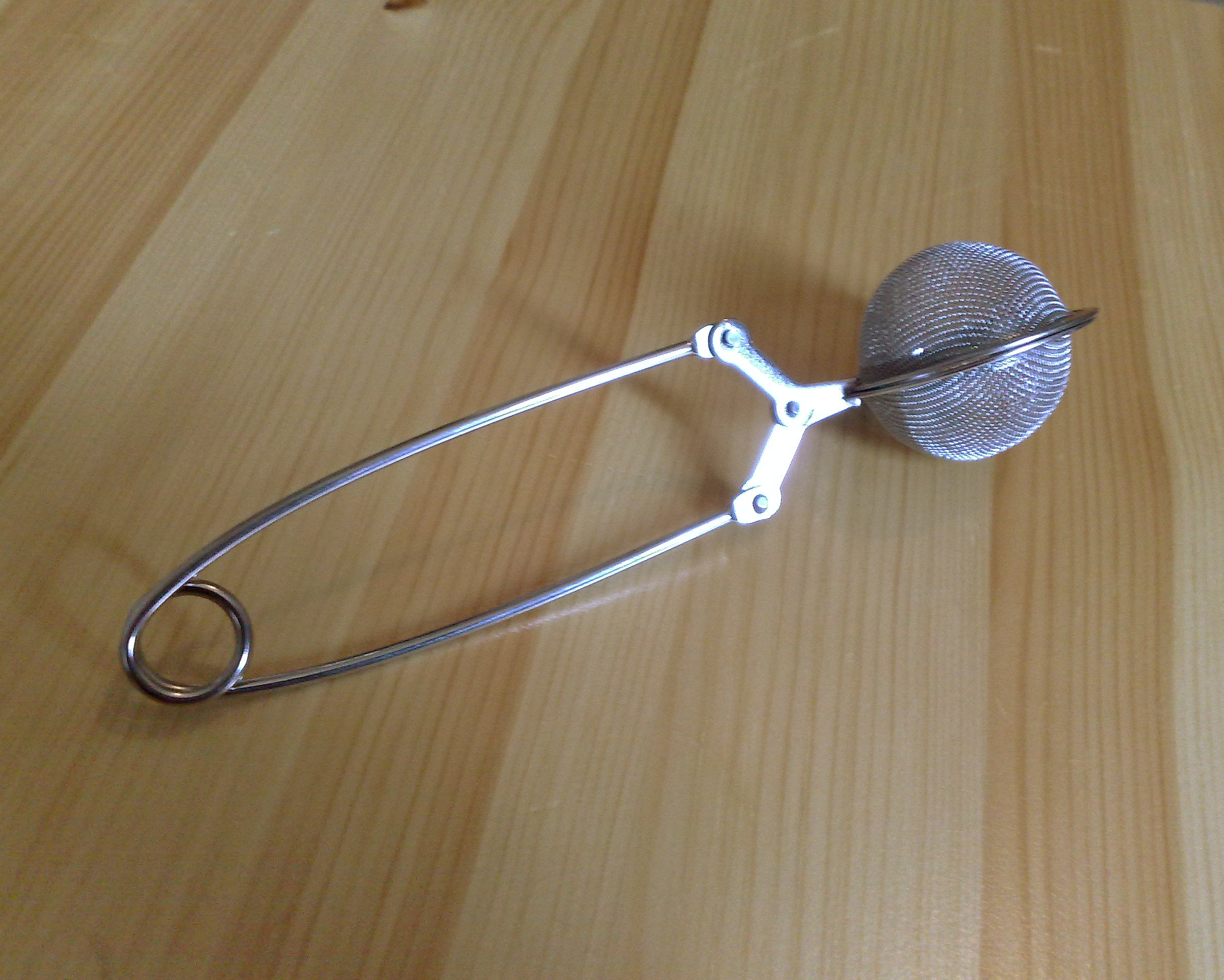
A snap ball tea strainer.

Snap ball tea strainers are automatically sealed with the force of the end of the handle that is circulated like a spring. The spring handle requires more metal to manufacture, so they are usually a bit more expensive than regular infuser balls.

The handle in snap ball tea strainers make them more practical:

- They can be used as a spoon to swirl solutions that will dissolve their content faster than tea infusers without a handle.
- Air inside a snap ball infuser can easily be eliminated by shaking the handle once it has been put into liquid, to make sure everything inside the ball becomes submerged.

=== Shut-off infusers ===
Shut-off infusers are left in the pot after the brewing process is complete.

==== Alternatives ====
===== French press =====
While not common, a French press may be used as a tea infuser. However, most teas are infused only for a limited time and then removed from the water so that the drink does not become bitter.

In gōngfu chá (功夫茶), a modern method of infusing tea in China, tea can be infused through a gàiwǎn (盖碗), a tea pot (茶壶) or a gōngdào bēi (公道杯).

== See also ==
- Tea culture
- Melitta 401 and Melitta 402 tea filters
