= Chaires =

Chaires may refer to:

== People ==
- Chaires family of Florida:
  - Benjamin Chaires (1786–1838), American planter, land owner, banker and investor in Territorial Florida
  - Hal Chaires (1908–1965), state legislator in Florida
  - McQueen Chaires (1871–1959), state legislator in Florida
  - Thomas Chaires (1847–1899), state legislator in Florida
- Arturo Chaires (1937–2020), Mexican footballer
- Carlos Rodríguez Chaires (born 1994), Mexican footballer
- Nestor Chaires (Néstor Mesta Cháyres, 1908–1971), Mexican tenor

== Places ==
- Chaires, Florida, unincorporated community in Leon County, Florida
  - Chaires Community Historic District, U.S. historic district located in Chaires, Florida
  - Chaires School, elementary school located in the unincorporated community of Chaires, Florida
  - Joseph Chaires Plantation, in southern Leon County, Florida

== See also ==
- Chair (disambiguation)
- Chaire, a type of pottery
- Cháirez, a surname
