= Richard Kroner =

German philosopher (1884–1974)

Richard Kroner (German: [ˈkʁoːnɐ]; 8 March 1884, Breslau – 2 November 1974, Mammern) was a German neo-Hegelian philosopher, known for his Von Kant bis Hegel (2 vols., 1921–1924), a history of German idealism written from a neo-Hegelian point of view.

He was a Christian from a Jewish background. He is known for his formulation of Hegel as 'the Protestant Aquinas'.

== Biography ==
Kroner earned his doctorate at the University of Freiburg under Heinrich Rickert in 1908.

In 1924, Victor Klemperer supported a call for Kroner to a new chair for theoretical pedagogics and philosophy at Technische Hochschule Dresden, where he became friends with Paul Tillich.

At the first International Hegel Congress that was held in The Hague in April 1930 Kroner was elected first chairman of the newly founded International Hegel Society ("Internationaler Hegel-Bund").

Under Nazi legislation Kroner's Jewish ancestry as well as his principled democratic stance led to his "suspension" (dismissal) from his university position at Kiel in 1934. He was replaced briefly by Hans-Georg Gadamer, a personal friend.

The American philosopher Otis Lee studied with Kroner for the academic year 1933–1934 and helped him escape to the United States and find a new academic position at Manhattan's Union Theological Seminary.

Kroner's ideas on Hegel, including his slant via Kierkegaard, were taken up by some existentialist thinkers, including Lev Shestov and Nikolai Berdyaev.

In 1952 Richard Kroner retired to Elkins Park, Pennsylvania before moving to Switzerland. He was awarded the Große Bundesverdienstkreuz.

The Kroners are buried at Richmond Cemetery.

== Works ==
- Zweck und Gesetz in der Biologie. Eine logische Untersuchung (1913)
- Kants Weltanschauung (1914)
- Hegel. Zum 100. Todestag (1932)
- Die Selbstverwirklichung des Geistes. Prolegomena zur Kulturphilosophie (1928)
- Von Kant bis Hegel.
  - 1. Band: Von der Vernunftkritik zur Naturphilosophie (1921)
  - 2. Band: Von der Naturphilosophie zur Philosophie des Geistes (1924)
- The Religious Function of Imagination (1941)
- Culture and Faith (1951)
- Speculation in pre-Christian philosophy (1957)
- Selbstbesinnung. Drei Lehrstunden (1958)
- Speculation and Revelation In Modern Philosophy (1961)
- Between Faith and Thought: Reflections and Suggestions (1966)
- Freiheit und Gnade (1969)

== Sources ==
- On Two Books by Richard Kroner (1930) - Lev Shestov
- Richard Kroner (1884-1974). Ein christlicher Philosoph jüdischer Herkunft unter dem Schatten Hitlers (1993) – Walter Asmus (1903-1996)
