= Senchadō =

Form of Japanese tea ceremony

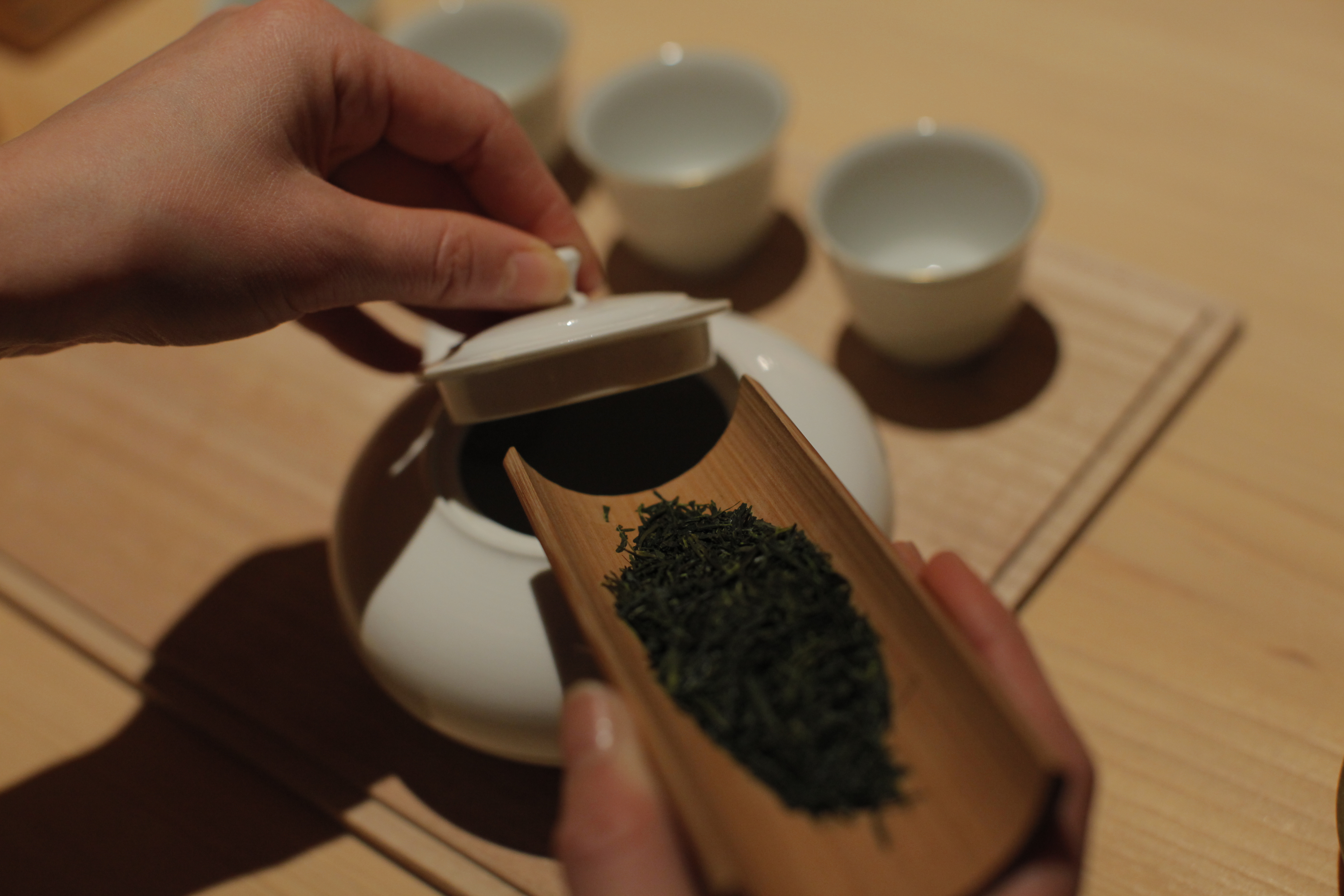
Preparation of Sencha tea

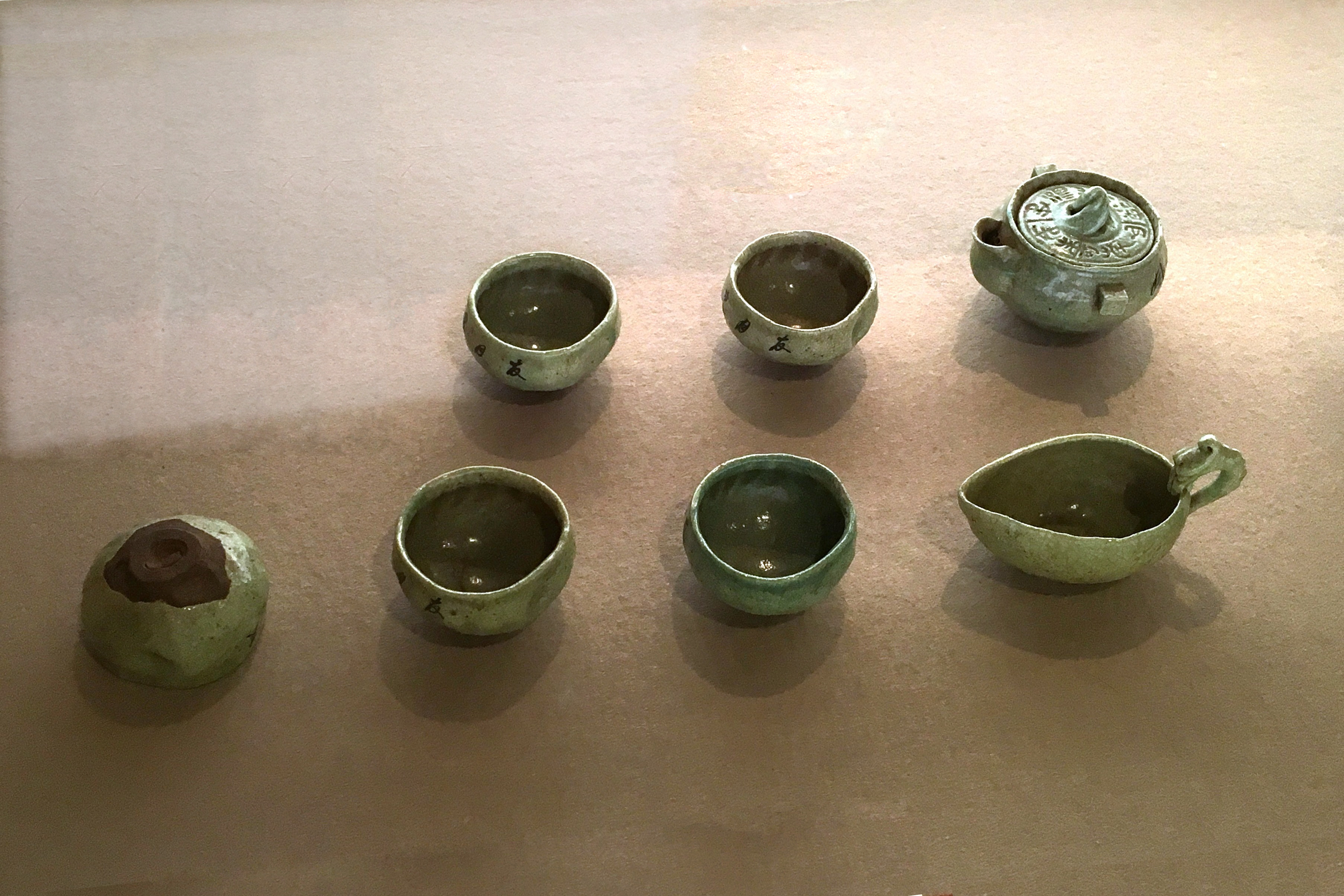
A set of Sencha utensils, Sasashima ware by Maki Bokusai, Edo period, 18th–19th century

Senchadō (煎茶道; "way of sencha") is a Japanese variant of chadō ("way of tea"). It involves the preparation and drinking of sencha green tea, especially the high grade gyokuro type.

== History ==
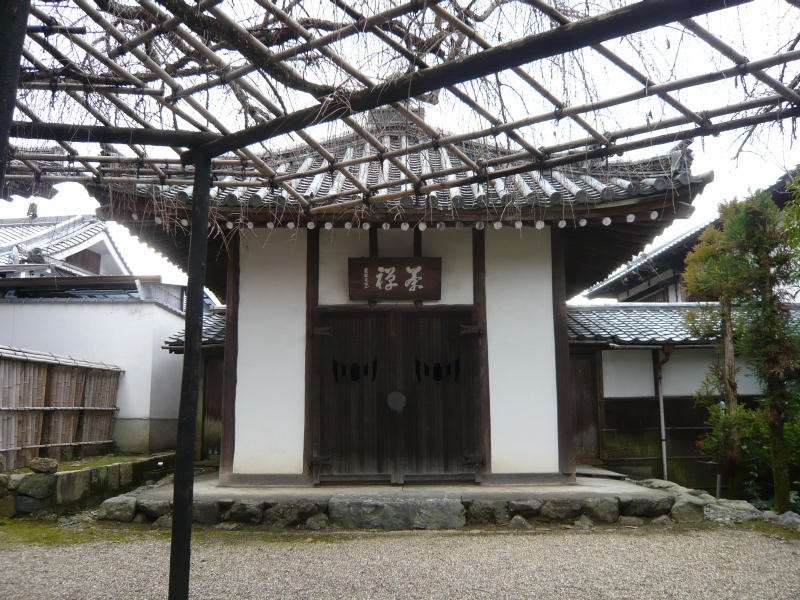
The tea hall at Manpuku-ji in Uji, Kyoto

Towards the end of the 17th century in the Edo period, Chinese merchants visiting Nagasaki showed how brewed tea should be drunk, as practised in the Ming dynasty court. This practise of the Chinese tea culture spread in the 18th century until the beginning of the Meiji era, particularly among literati merchants, in the form of friends meeting in a less formal atmosphere than the chanoyu. Appreciation of painting and literacy objects then took on particular importance. These meetings, often followed by genuine meals, were the opportunity to admire the host's collections, most often composed of objects imported from China or made in Japan in Chinese style called karamono.

In difference to the preparation of matcha tea, which is powdered, sencha is prepared using small leaf tea.

Similarly to the Chinese Gongfu tea ceremony, senchadō has a codified form of preparation, presentation and enjoyment of tea.

In spring 2020 the Aichi Prefectural Ceramic Museum in cooperation with Meiji-mura held a large sencha exhibition about Kimura Teizo, an outstanding art collector born in Nagoya. He was already collecting works by Kumagai Morikazu at the age of 25 and became patron of the arts. His collection of 3,307 items was donated to the Aichi Prefectural Museum of Art, including modern and contemporary art, Edo period paintings, tea pottery, Buddhist art and archaeological relics.

== Utensils ==
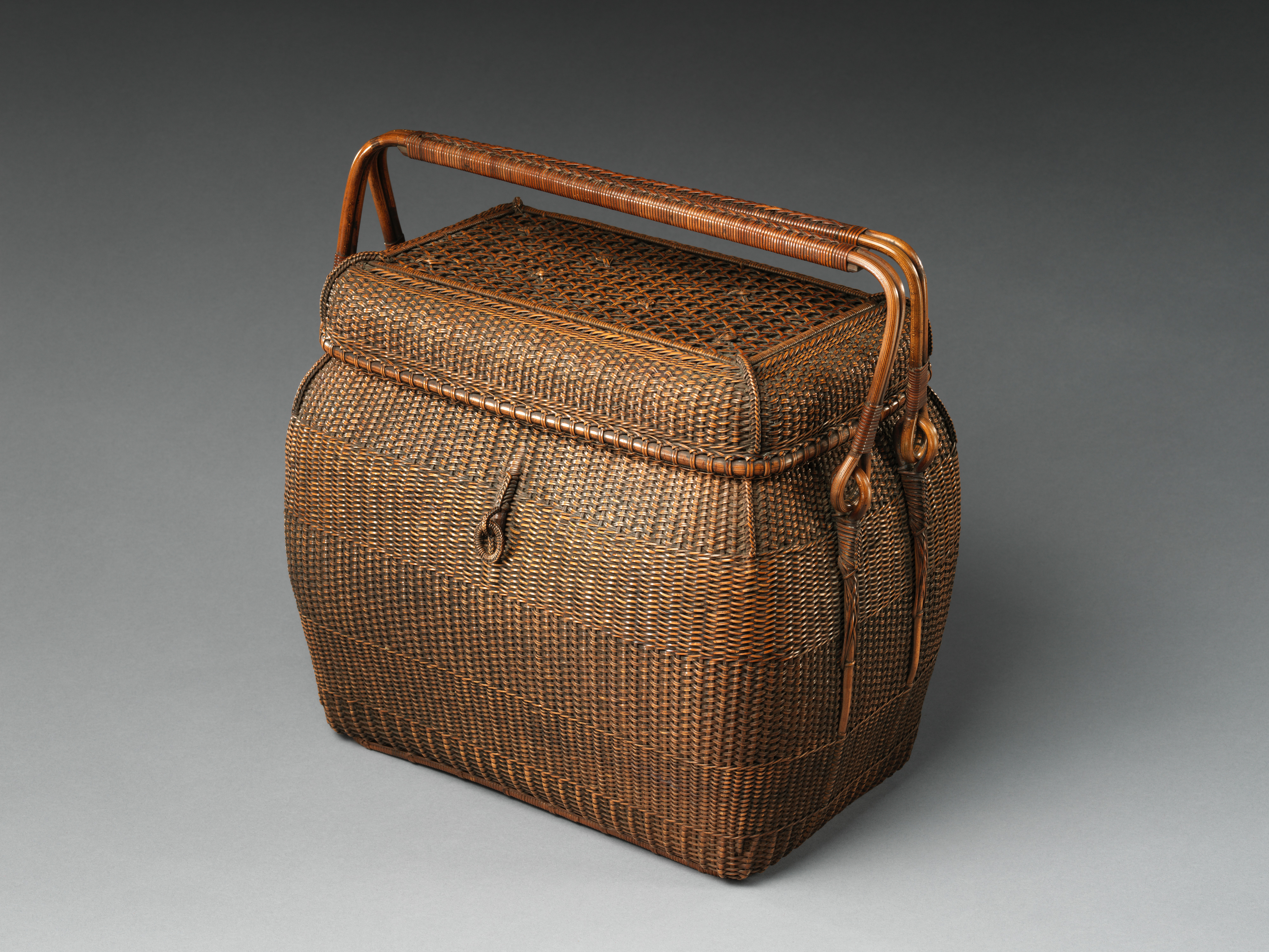
Basket for transporting Sencha tea utensils (Chakago or Teiran), made out of rattan, by Hayakawa Shōkosai I, c. 1877–80s

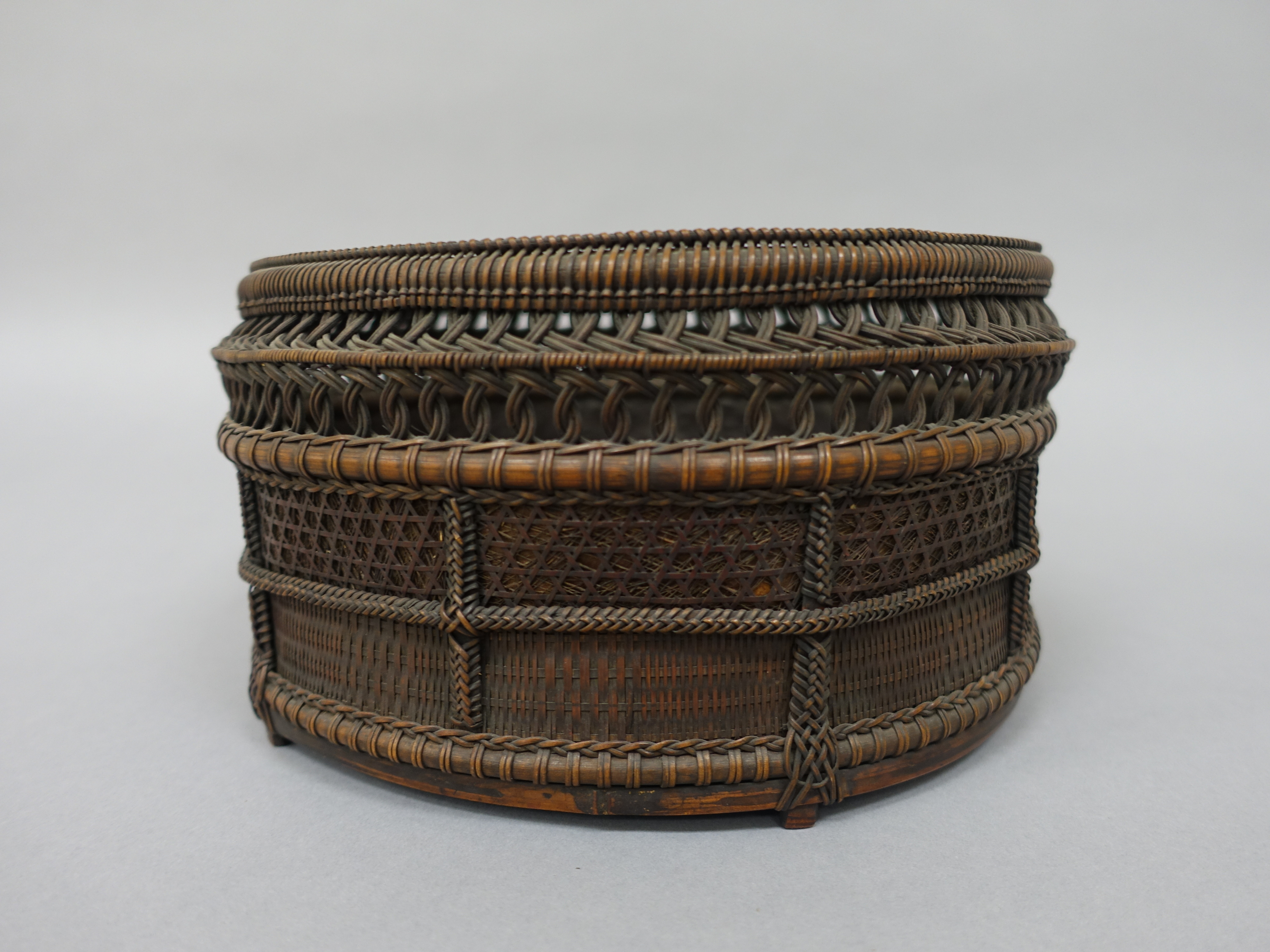
Chinese-style charcoal basket (sairō-sumitori) for Sencha tea ceremony, made out of bamboo, 19th century

Senchadō uses utensils which are necessary to prepare tea. Some of them are used in macha tea as well. Different schools will sometimes use different names for the same item, and also use some of the items listed but not necessarily all of them:

- Mat (茶具褥) that is placed in the room and delineates the work area
- Stove (凉爐)
- Stove equipment:
  - Furnace fan (爐扇)
  - Feather broom (羽帚)
  - Fire chopsticks (火箸 Hibashi)
  - Tank holder (bottle) (罐座 Kama-za)
  - charcoal (烏府 Karasu-fu)
- Fire screen (爐屏 Robyō)
- Tea kettle made out of pottery (保宇夫良)
- Tea kettle (水注 Mizu chū)
- Waste water receptacle (建水 Kensui)
- Chaire (茶心壺 Tea container)
- Tea scoop (仙媒)
- Chakin (茶巾 "tea cloth") is a small cloth used to wipe the chawan
- Kintō (巾筒 "cloth tube") is a small tube or vessel used to store the chakin during use
- Kyūsu (急須) is a small teapot
- Houhin smaller kyusu with no handle (泡瓶)
- Yuzamashi small vessel to cool water (湯冷)
- Chawan (煎茶碗 "tea bowl"), also known as Kumidashi (汲み出し), normally a small-sized cup (yunomi) made out of porcelain and glazed in white
- Wantō (碗筒 "bowl tube") is a tube or container normally made out of woven bamboo, to store the small chawan tea cups
- Tea cup coasters, made out metal, wood or lacquer (煎茶托 Chataku or 瓶床)
- Tray (盆)
- Censer (香爐 Kōro)
- Incense tube (綫香筒)
- Tea banner (茶旗)
- Curtain to the room (帳)
- Tea container (茶櫃 Chaki)
- Utensils box (提籃)
- Tea board (茶盤)
- Tea cabine (茶局)
- Stand (棚)

== See also ==
- Bunjinga
- Bunjinbana
