= Rotating chair =

Rotating chair may refer to:

- Swivel chair, a chair with a single central leg that allows the seat to rotate
- the role of a chairperson when served in turns by several members of a group

== See also ==
- Chair (disambiguation)
