= Cháirez =

Cháirez is a surname. Notable people with the surname include:

- Fabián Cháirez (born 1987), Mexican visual artist
- Maribel Aguilera Cháirez (born 1977), Mexican politician

== See also ==
- Chaires (disambiguation), including people with the name
