= Otis Hamilton Lee =

American philosopher

Otis Hamilton Lee (28 September 1902, Montevideo, Minnesota – 17 September 1948, Vermont) was an American philosopher, noteworthy as a Guggenheim Fellow.

Lee attended Fargo College from 1920 to 1922 and then the University of Minnesota, where he graduated with B.A. in 1924. From 1924 to 1927 he was a Rhodes Scholar at St John's College, Oxford, where he graduated with A.B. in 1926. From 1927 to 1929 he was an instructor in philosophy at the University of Michigan. In 1930 he received his Ph.D. in philosophy from Harvard University, where he was an Austin Fellow from 1929 to 1930. At Harvard University he was an instructor and tutor from 1930 to 1933 and for the academic year 1934–1935. At Harvard he was also a reader (i.e. a course assistant who grades papers) for Alfred North Whitehead for the academic year 1931–1932, as well as a Harvard Milton Scholar for the academic year 1933–1934. Lee pursued postdoctoral study at the University of Kiel from 1933 to 1934 and at the University of Freiburg in the summer of 1934. For the academic year 1940–1941, he was appointed a Guggenheim Fellow for the writing of a book on the nature of philosophical inquiry.

At Oxford in the 1920s he became familiar with the German philosophical tradition as interpreted by Oxford's Hegelians. At Harvard he was influenced by the pragmatism of C. I. Lewis and the metaphysics of Alfred North Whitehead. For the academic year 1933–1934 Lee went with his wife Dorothy to study neo-Hegelian philosophy with Richard Kroner.

From 1935 to 1938 Lee was an associate professor at Pomona College. From 1938 until his death in 1948, he was a professor of philosophy and department chair at Vassar College. A sudden, unexpected heart attack caused his death.

He was an editor and contributor for the 1936 book Philosophical Essays for Alfred North Whitehead; this is a collection of nine essays written for Whitehead by nine of his former students, who were (besides Lee): F. S. C. Northrop, Raphael Demos, Scott Buchanan, Willard Van Orman Quine, Henry Siggins Leonard (1905–1967), Paul Weiss, S. Kerby-Miller, and Charles Hartshorne. Otis Lee's articles were published in The Philosophical Review, International Journal of Ethics, Archive of Philosophy and Theory of Knowledge, The Journal of Philosophy, and Philosophy of Science. He was on the editorial board of The Review of Metaphysics.

He married anthropologist Dorothy D. Lee (1905–1975). They had four children, Anna Maud, Mary H., Ronald and Sabra.
