= Maribel Aguilera Cháirez =

Mexican politician

- Education: Universidad Juárez del Estado de Durango
- Occupation: Politician
- Political party: PRI, MORENA

Maribel Aguilera Cháirez (Note: In this Mexican name, the surname is Aguilera and the second or maternal family name is Cháirez.) (born 20 December 1977) is a Mexican politician. Originally affiliated with the Institutional Revolutionary Party (PRI), she joined the National Regeneration Movement (Morena) in 2018.

In the 2018 general election, she was elected to the Chamber of Deputies for the 64th session of Congress, representing Durango's 3rd district for Morena, and she was re-elected to the same seat in 2021.

== Life ==
Aguilera Cháirez obtained a law degree from the Universidad Juárez del Estado de Durango (UJED). In 2004, she was tapped to head the Durango Women's Institute (IMD), a post she left in 2007 to run for office. She was a local deputy in the Congress of Durango from 2007 to 2010, entering the state legislature at the age of 29, and was an unused alternate federal deputy in the 61st Congress (2009–2012).

In February 2018, Aguilera left the PRI to join Morena along with several other former legislators from Durango. She was elected to the Chamber of Deputies for Durango's 3rd district in the 2018 general election and served on three commissions: Rural Development and Conservation; Migratory Matters; and Economy, Commerce and Competitiveness. She was re-elected to the same seat in the 2021 mid-terms but resigned in January 2022 to take charge of the federal government's social programmes in Durango; she was replaced for the remainder of her term by her alternate, Martha Alicia Arreola Martínez.

Aguilera is also the president of the Asociación de Mujeres de México y el Mundo, A.C. (Association of Women of Mexico and the World).
