= Dorothy D. Lee =

American anthropologist (1905–1975)

Dorothy Demetracopolou Lee (1905– April 18, 1975) was an American anthropologist, author and philosopher of cultural anthropology. Born in Constantinople, capital of the Ottoman Empire, she was Greek by birth and was educated, married, and raised her four children in the U.S. Her husband was American philosopher Otis Hamilton Lee (1905–1948). Her children were Anna Maud Lee, Mary H. Lee, Ronald and Sabra.

She graduated from Vassar College in 1927 and then pursued her graduate studies at the University of California-Berkeley, where she studied under Alfred Kroeber and Robert Lowie. In 1931, based on research on the Loon Woman myth among northern Californian Indians, she became the third female anthropologist at Berkeley to earn her doctorate at Berkeley. She then briefly taught anthropology at the University of Washington and Sarah Lawrence College, before accepting a more permanent teaching position at Vassar College in 1939 and remaining there until 1953. Here she raised her four children and occasionally published in academic journals. Dr. Lee has written about the languages of the Wintu, Hopi, Tikopia, Trobriand, and many other cultures. Of particular significance is her theoretically innovative 1950 article "Lineal and Nonlineal Codifications of Reality," first published in the journal Psychosomatic Medicine No.12, pp. 89–97. As a cultural anthropologist, her work is most often associated with Benjamin Whorf.

In 1953, she accepted a position at the Merrill-Palmer Institute, now The Merrill Palmer Skillman Institute for Child & Family Development, Wayne State University in Detroit.

From 1959 to 1962, she was a lecturer and research anthropologist at Harvard University. Next, she accepted an invitation from Edmund Carpenter to teach in the newly formed anthropology program at California State University, Northridge (then known as San Fernando Valley State College). Several other brief appointments at other universities followed. She finally settled down in Cambridge, Massachusetts where she died in 1975.

Lee's most well-known work centers on "a concern with human problems and a utilization of a broad concept of culture to describe and highlight human variability," as well as the interplay between language, culture, and reality. Less well-known are her essays that employ anthropological data to explore questions of individual autonomy, the joy of participation, equality of opportunity, freedom and responsibility.

== Bibliography ==
- Conceptual Implications of an Indian Language, Philosophy of Science 5, 1938, pp. 89–102
- A Primitive System of Values, Philosophy of Science 7, 1940, pp. 355–378
- Greek Tales of Priest and Priestwife, The Journal of American Folklore, Vol. 60, No. 236 (April–June, 1947), pp. 163–167
- What Shall We Teach Women?, Mademoiselle, August 1947, p. 213
- Are Basic Needs Ultimate?, Journal of Abnormal and Social Psychology 43, 1948, pp. 91-95
- Lineal and nonlineal codifications of reality, Bobbs-Merrill, 1950 (published in Psychosomatic Medicine 12, 1950, pp. 89—97)
- Greek Personal Anecdotes of the Supernatural, The Journal of American Folklore, Vol. 64, No. 253 (July–September, 1951), pp. 307-312
- Religious perspectives of college teaching in anthropology, Edward W. Hazen Foundation, 1951
- Valuing the Self: What We Can Learn from Other Cultures, Waveland Press, 1976, ISBN 0-88133-229-1
- Freedom and Culture (epilogue by Jeffrey Ehrenreich), Waveland Press, 1987, ISBN 0-88133-303-4
