= Chakin =

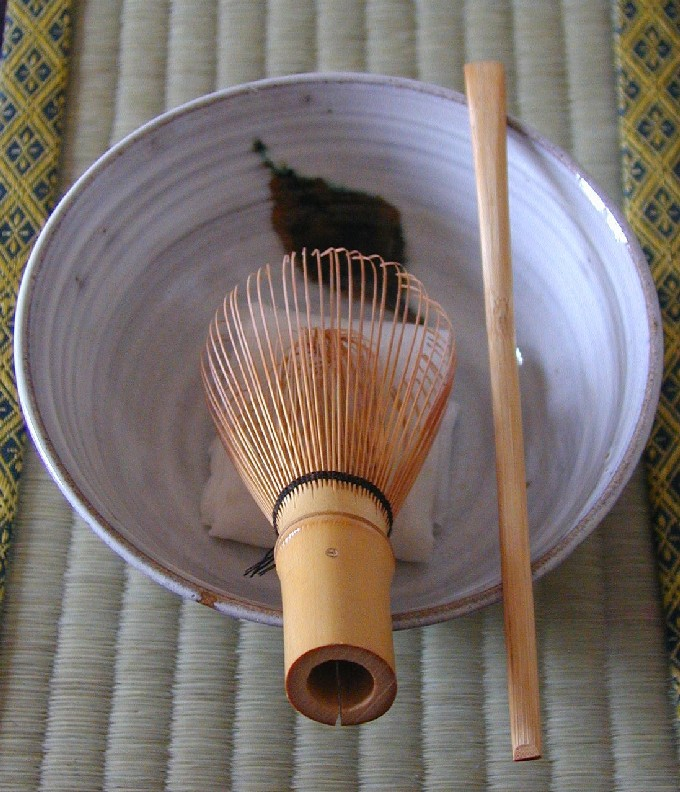
Chakin at the bottom of the tea bowl

Chakin (Japanese: 茶巾 "tea towel") is a small rectangular cloth used to wipe teabowls called chawan. It is a part of Japanese tea utensils. It is also used in Senchadō.

White linen is often used, or hemp cloth. The high-quality bleached hemp cloth Narazarashi (奈良晒) from Nara Prefecture is historically especially esteemed. The size varies depending on the application and style, but it is often a rectangle of about 1 shaku (尺) x 5 sun (寸) (30.3 x 15.2cm). The edges lengthwise have a narrow rolled hem finished with overlock stitching. These two hems face opposite sides of the cloth.

The chakin is folded in a specific manner and placed, when not used, into a small vessel or cylinder that is called kintō (巾筒).
