= Japanese tea utensils =

Equipment and utensils used in Japanese tea ceremony

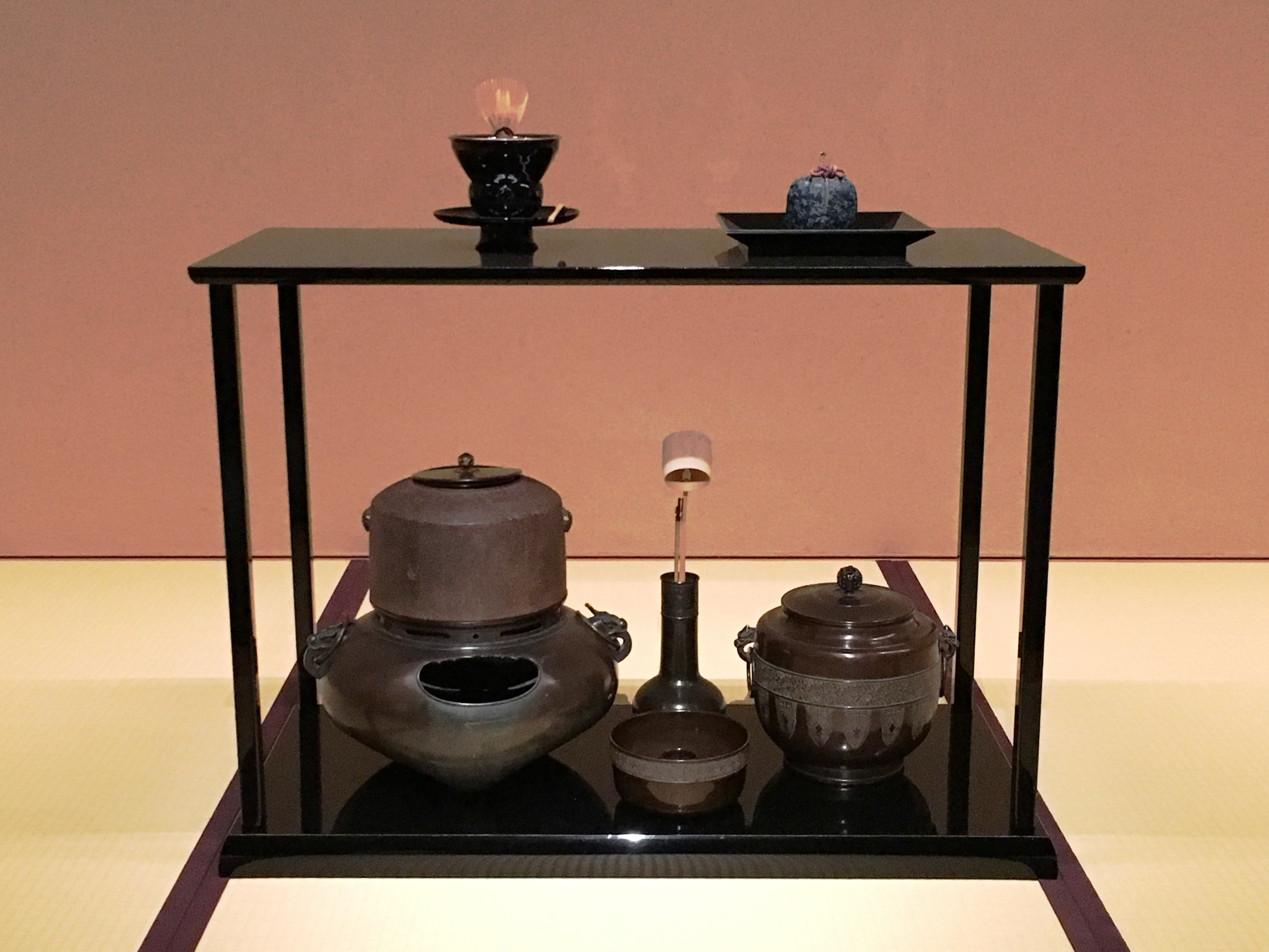
A set of tea utensils by the Mushakōjisenke. From the top left: tenmoku chawan (bowl) and chaseki (whisk) with tea powder container (natsume) and ivory lid. Bottom: iron pot placed on furo, bamboo ladle and hibashi placed upright in shakutate, fresh water container mizusashi on lacquered wood shelf tana

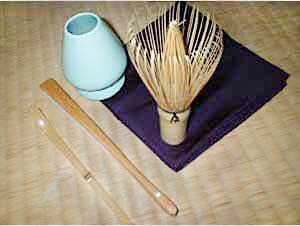
Some implements for tea ceremony. From bottom left: chashaku (tea scoop), sensu (fan), chasen kusenaoshi (whisk shaper), chasen (bamboo whisk) and fukusa (purple silk cloth)

Tea utensils (茶道具, chadōgu) are the tools and utensils used in chadō, the Japanese way of tea.

Tea utensils can be divided into five major categories:

- sōshoku dōgu (装飾道具, 'decorative items')
- temae dōgu (点前道具, 'items for the tea-making service')
- kaiseki dōgu (懐石道具, 'items for the chakaiseku meal')
- mizuya dōgu (水屋道具, 'items used in the preparation room')
- machiai dōgu/roji dōgu (待合道具/露地道具, 'items for the waiting room'/'items for the garden')

A wide range of utensils, known collectively as dōgu, is necessary for even the most basic tea ceremony. Generally, items which guests prepare themselves with for attending a chanoyu gathering are not considered chadōgu; rather, the term fundamentally applies to items involved to "host" a chanoyu gathering. This article, however, includes all forms of implements and paraphernalia involved in the practice of chanoyu.

High-end utensils are cherished, well preserved and documented and serve as historical artifacts. The honorary title Senke Jusshoku is given to the ten artisans that provide the utensils for the events held by the three primary iemoto Schools of Japanese tea known as the san-senke.

Utensils used for sencha are different, using a usually five-piece set of small cups, a small pot and a small cup to pour hot water. These utensils are typically ceramic.

== Boxes ==
In Japan, cherished items are customarily stored in purpose-made wooden boxes. Valuable items for tea ceremony are usually stored in such a box, and in some cases, if the item has a long and distinguished history, several layers of boxes: an inner storage box (uchibako), middle storage box (nakabako), and outer storage box (sotobako).

The storage boxes for tea implements are not tea equipment in themselves, but still hold importance in the practice of chanoyu, as the boxes used for particularly old and distinguished objects often feature inscriptions which serve to validate their history and provenance.

=== Chabako ===
Chabako (茶箱, lit. 'tea box[es]') are special lidded boxes containing the tea bowl, tea caddy, tea scoop and other equipment. They constitute portable tea-making sets for travel and making tea outdoors, and are available in many styles.

The "rikyū model", made of plain paulownia wood, comes in a large size and a small size. The interior dimensions of the large version are slightly smaller than 19 centimetres (7.5 in) in length, 13 centimetres (5.1 in) in width, and 11.5 centimetres (4.5 in) in height. Rikyū-model chabako also feature an internal shelf.

Originally, there were no rules for the tea-making procedure (temae). However, the 11th-generation head of the Urasenke school of tea created certain types of procedures. For the procedures, the box is carried into the place where the tea is to be made, sometimes on a tray, and the ceremony proceeds with each item being removed from, and finally returned to, the box.

Tea boxes are made of wood, and may be lacquered and decorated, or left untreated. There are similar portable tea-making sets called chakago (茶籠, lit. 'tea basket[s]'), in which case the box is formed through basket weaving.

== Charcoal-related items ==
=== Ash ===
Ash, known as hai (灰), appears most commonly in chanoyu in the portable brazier (furo), the sunken hearth (ro) which may be used in a tea room in the cold season, and the container for the lighter fire in the smoking set (hiire).

In tea ceremony, ash serves as a protective bed for the charcoal fire. Great care is given to the quality and appearance of the ash, and there are different kinds of ash for different purposes. They include the following:

- Fujibai (藤灰, lit. 'wisteria ash') – used as "sprinkling ash" (蒔灰, makibai) to decorate the sculpted ash in a brazier. It is a beautiful, smooth white ash produced by burning wisteria bean pods.
- Fukusabai (ふくさ灰, lit. 'silky ash') – a dry ash specially prepared to have a smooth texture free from visible impurities. This is the main kind of ash used in portable braziers.
- Hishibai (菱灰, lit. 'caltrop ash') – produced by burning the shells of water caltrops. It is a smooth reddish-brown ash mainly used in the container for the lighter fire in the smoking set.
- Shimeshibai (湿灰, lit. 'moist ash') – the slightly damp ash used in the sunken hearth.
- Warabai (藁灰, lit. 'straw ash') – sticks of roasted straw. The black warabai is neatly arranged on top of the ash in the brazier. This is reserved for the final days of the brazier season and the use, at that time, of a worn-looking metal brazier (yatsureburo). Warabai is also used in hand warmers (teaburi) and hibachi.

=== Ash container ===
Haiki (灰器) is a shallow bowl used by the host to carry the ash into the tea room for the charcoal-laying procedure (sumidemae). It carries the "sprinkling ash" (makibai) for the procedure in the case of a portable brazier (furo), and the "moist ash" (shimeshibai) for the procedure in the case of a sunken hearth (ro). The styles for these are different.

=== Ash spoon ===
The haisaji (灰匙) is a spatula-like implement mainly used to shape the ash in the portable brazier (furo), or to sprinkle ash during the charcoal-laying procedure.

=== Charcoal ===
Sumi (炭) refers to the charcoal used in chanoyu. Sumi for the most part is made of chestnut-leaved oak (kunugi), carbonized by long hours of smoldering in a kiln. The long pieces of finished charcoal are cut into specific lengths for use; the lengths differing depending upon whether the charcoal will be used in a brazier or sunken hearth.

In addition, a unique kind of charcoal called eda-zumi (枝炭, lit. 'branch charcoal') is used in chanoyu for its artistic effect. It is produced by charring twigs of azalea, camellia, or some variety of oak, and then coating them with a lime substance made of powdered seashells.

=== Charcoal container ===
The sumitori (炭斗/炭取) is the container in which the host places the charcoal and charcoal-laying implements for transporting them to and from the tea room for the charcoal-laying procedure. Many sumitori are made of basketry.

=== Charcoal carrier ===
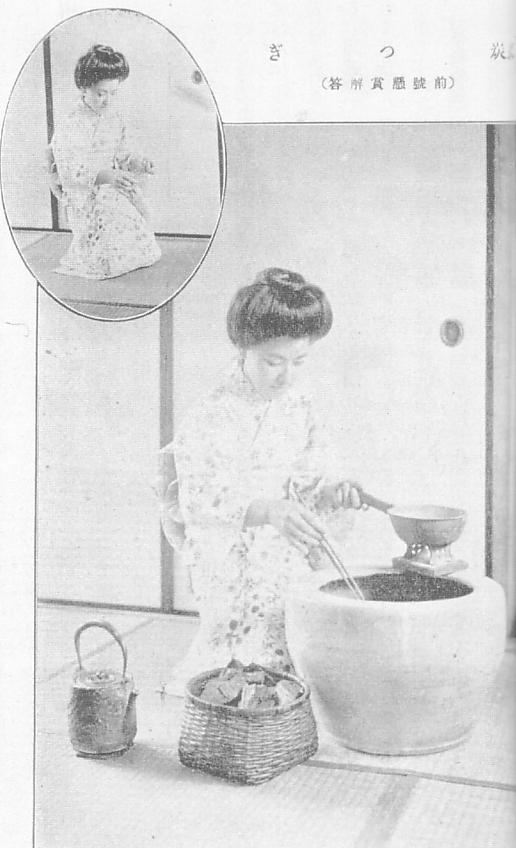
Adding charcoal to a brazier. Charcoal is removed from the hakosumitori (charcoal basket) using hibashi (fire chopsticks). From a Japanese magazine dated 1912

Hakosumitori (箱炭斗) is a charcoal container used in the preparation room, and not considered a formal piece of equipment. It is brought into the tea room if the charcoal in the portable brazier or sunken hearth requires replenishing. It is box-shaped, has a handle, and is made of wood—usually mulberry wood.

=== Feather brooms ===
Habōki (羽箒) is a feather broom with a number of styles. The kind composed of three layered feathers and referred to therefore as mitsubane (三つ羽) is used to dust off the portable brazier or sunken hearth during the charcoal-laying procedure. It is part of the set of equipment carried into the tea room with the charcoal container (sumitori). Other kinds of feather brooms are used for sweeping the tea room.

=== Hibashi ===
Hibashi (火箸, lit. 'fire chopsticks') are metal chopsticks used to handle charcoal.

=== Incense container ===
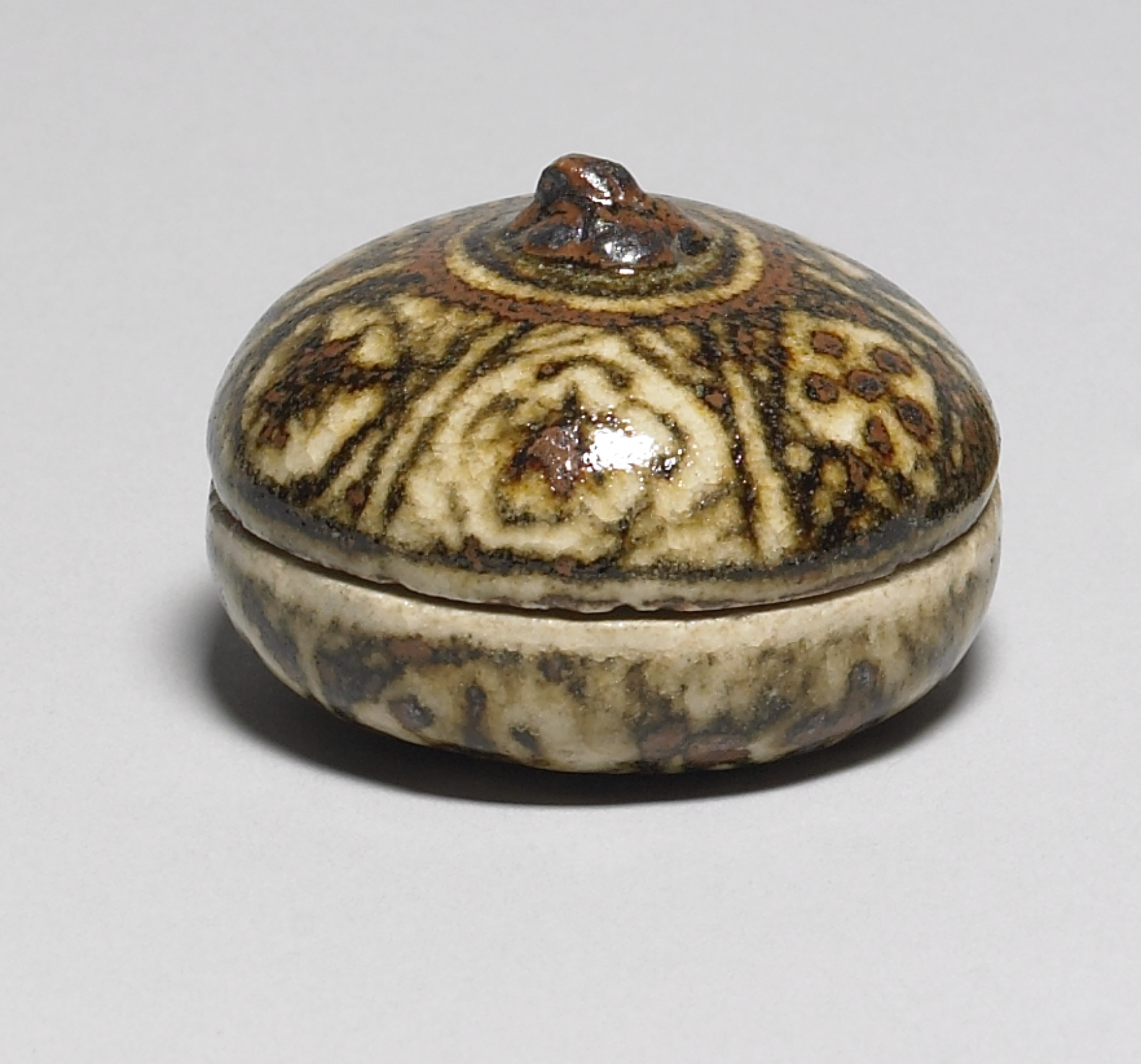
Incense box kōgō, influenced by Thai Sawankhalok style, by a follower of Ogata Kenzan (19th century)

Kōgō (香合) is a small lidded container for the incense that is added to the charcoal fire during the charcoal-laying procedure. For the kneaded incense (nerikō) that is used in a sunken hearth (ro), the container is generally made of ceramic. For the chips of incense wood (kōboku) used in a portable brazier (furo), it is generally made of lacquer ware or plain wood. There are also incense containers made of clam shells.

== Cloth items ==
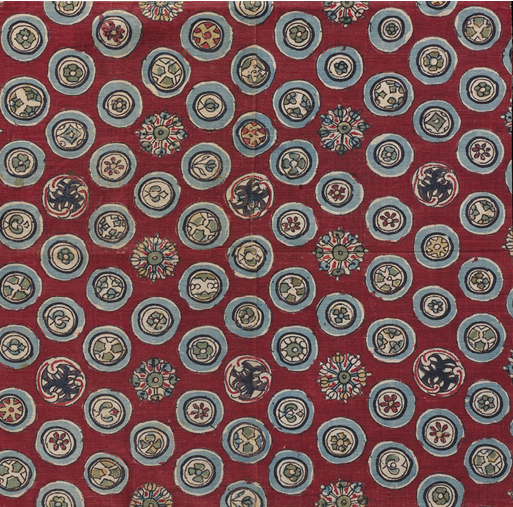
Tea ceremony sarasa (mat), Indian trade cloth for the Japanese market, 17th or 18th century. 28 cm × 28 cm (11 in × 11 in)

=== Chakin ===
A chakin (茶巾) is a small rectangular white linen or hemp cloth mainly used to wipe the tea bowl. There are two main sizes: large and small. Usually the plain term chakin is used in reference to the small size, which is approximately 30.3 centimetres (11.9 in) long and 15.2 centimetres (6.0 in) wide. The raw edges on the lengthwise sides have a narrow rolled hem finished with overlock stitching. These two hems face opposite sides of the cloth.

=== Dashibukusa ===
A dashibukusa (出し帛紗) is, like a fukusa, a double layer patterned silk cloth approximately 30 centimetres (12 in) square, with a fold on one edge and the other three edges sewn together so the stitching is invisible. It is used by Omotesenke practitioners in the same way as the kobukusa: the host and the guests each carry one, which is kept in the breast of the kimono. It is sometimes used by guests to protect the tea implements whilst examining them, and the host will put one out with the tea bowl when serving thick tea.

=== Fukusa ===
A fukusa (帛紗) is a double layer silk cloth approximately 30 centimetres (12 in) square, with a fold on one edge and the other three edges sewn together so the stitching is invisible. It is used for the symbolic cleansing of the tea scoop and tea caddy, and (usually by women) to handle hot kettle or pot lids. The host and assistants at a tea gathering wear the fukusa tucked into the obi.

By tradition, the host of a formal tea ceremony uses a new, previously unused fukusa. Fukusa are most often monochromatic and unpatterned, but variations exist. There are different colours for men (usually purple) and women (orange or red), for people of different ages or skill levels, for different ceremonies and for different schools. The size and way of making fukusa was purportedly established by Sen Sōon, Sen no Rikyū's second wife.

=== Fukusabasami ===
Fukusabasami are rectangular wallets in many cases shaped like a traditional envelope, with a flap that closes the wallet. They are used to carry personal items needed to participate in tea ceremony or tea practice, such as kaishi paper, a pick for cutting and eating sweets, a kobukusa, a fukusa, and a fan. There are two sizes of fukusabasami corresponding to the two sizes of kaishi paper: a smaller one for women, and a larger one for men. Men's fukusabasami are generally less ornate and brightly coloured than women's, but this is not always the case.

=== Kobukusa ===
A kobukusa (古帛紗) is a cloth approximately 15.15 centimetres (5.96 in) square, which, unlike a fukusa, is generally made of a rich, thick, brocade fabric with a woven pattern. Its construction is similar to that of a fukusa. In the Urasenke school, both the host and guests each carry one. If wearing kimono, it is kept in the breast of the kimono. Guests not wearing kimono might carry it in their fukusabasami. The kobukusa is sometimes used by guests to protect the tea implements whilst examining them. Depending on the circumstances, the host may put one out with the tea.

=== Shifuku ===
Shifuku (仕覆) refers to a variety of bags used for storing chaire and other tea implements. They are traditionally made from silk, and are often patterned or brocaded. Extremely precious implements were often held in bags made brocade. Shifuku are secured with a kumihimo silk cord, which is tied in prescribed ways.

== Furniture ==
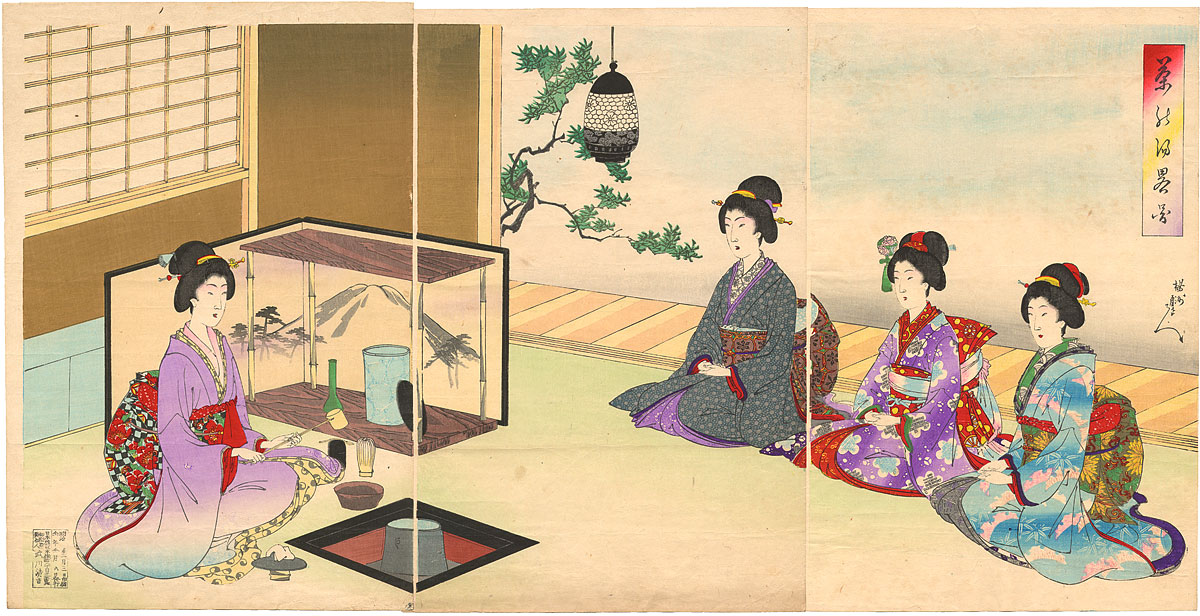
Shelves, surrounded by screen and holding a shakutate (tall thin vase) and mizusashi (water pot with wooden lid). The leftmost woman sits before a ro (sunken hearth), which holds a kama (water-boiling pot). She is holding a hishaku (bamboo ladle).

=== Daisu ===
The daisu (台子) is the original portable shelf unit used in the Japanese tea ceremony. The most orthodox style is the formal shindaisu, finished in highly polished black lacquer. The lower board rests on the tatami, and there are four posts at the corners of this, supporting a shelf. The width of this unit, from side to side, is equal to the width of a kyōma (Kyoto-size) tatami.

=== Nagaita ===
A nagaita (長板) is a wooden board, usually lacquered, on which the main tea implements may be displayed in the tea room. The size derives from the size of the lower board of a daisu.

=== Shikiita ===
Shikiita (敷板) is the term for the various kinds of boards on which the portable brazier (furo) may be arranged in the tea room. They are classified by shape as large, half-size, small, or round. They are wooden, and may be finished with lacquer and/or decorated in various other manners. There are rules for what kind of board to use with what kind of brazier.

=== Tana ===
Tana (棚), literally "shelf/shelves," is a generic term for various types of shelving used in the tea ceremonies and placed on the host's mat. Each type of tana has its own name. The three basic categories are built-in tana (shitsukedana), suspended tana (tsuridana), and portable shelves (okidana). The latter, okidana, are basically categorized as either large shelf units (ōdana) or small shelf units (kodana).

Tana are made of various types of wood, the most formal style finished in highly polished black lacquer. Some tana include drawers or shelves enclosed by sliding doors. Tea utensils may be placed onto/into the tana before the start of a ceremony and/or at the end. Tana are used only tea rooms of 4.5 tatami mats or larger.

== Hearths ==
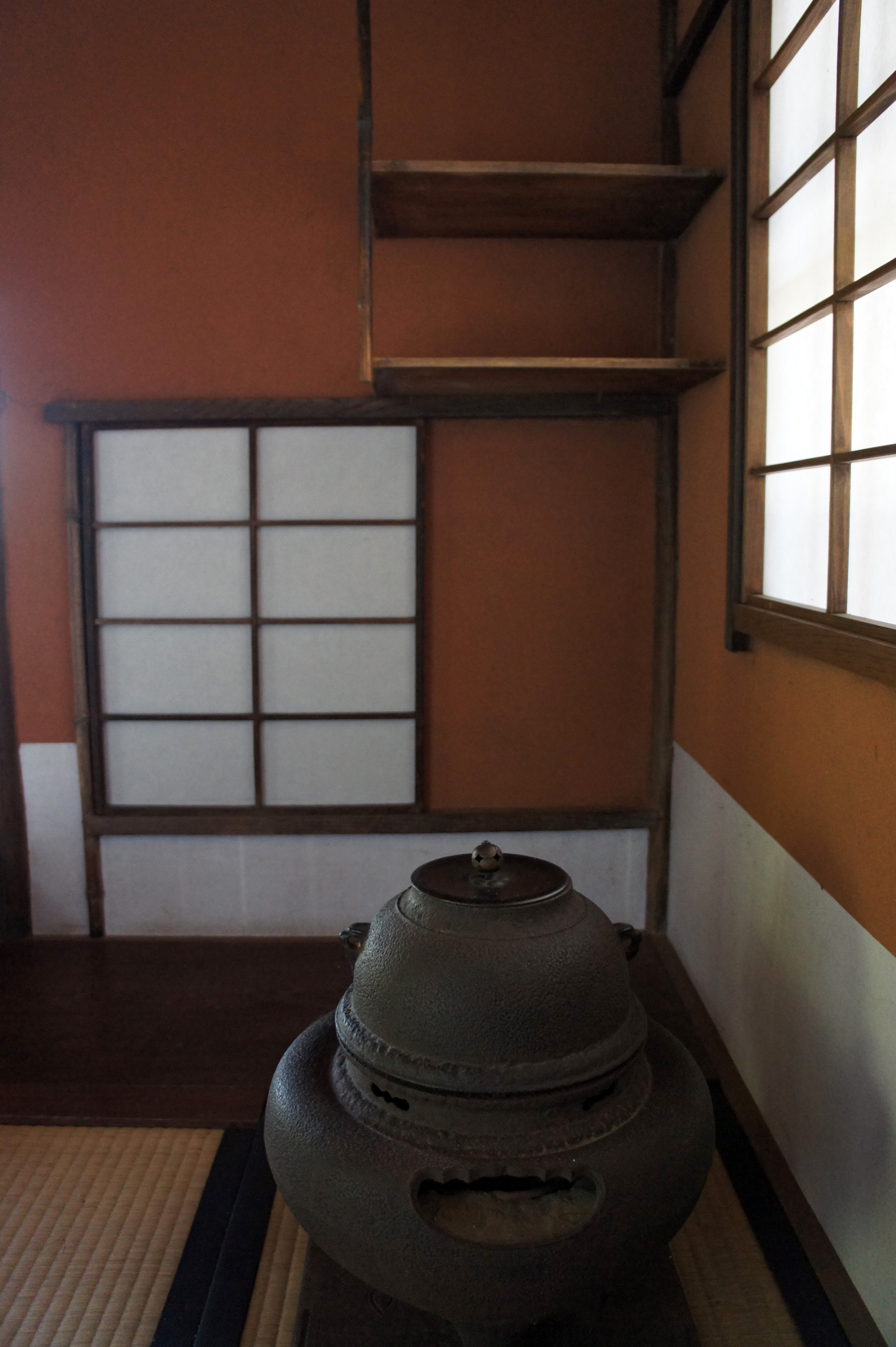
Portable brazier and pot in a teahouse in Isome-shi Garden, Ōtsu, Shiga prefecture, Japan

=== Binkake ===
Binkake (瓶掛) are relatively small portable braziers used to heat the kind of iron hot-water kettle called tetsubin, which has a spout and handle across the top.

=== Furo ===
Furo (風炉) are portable braziers used in the tea room to heat the hot water kettle (kama) to make the tea. They are commonly made of ceramic or metal, although there are rare examples of wooden furo as well.

=== Ro ===
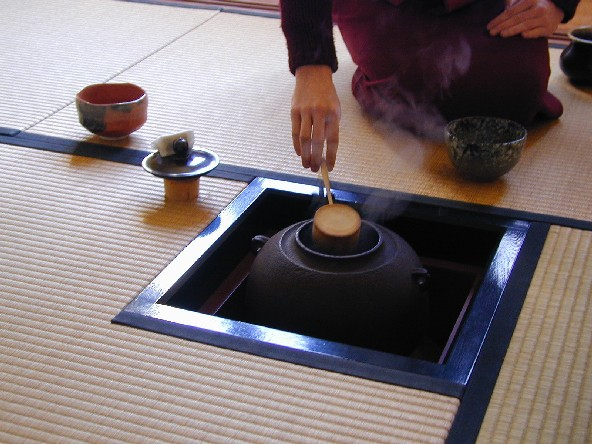
A ro (fire pit) in the Urasenke-style. The hishaku (bamboo ladle) is held in the opening of the kama, a container for boiling water. The futaoki is also supporting the kama's lid.

Ro (炉) are fire pits built into the floor of tea rooms and used in the cold season, for heating the hot water kettle (kama) to make the tea. The frame that fits around it at the top is called robuchi (炉縁, "ro frame"), and usually is of lacquered wood. In the season when the ro is not in use, the frame is removed and the ro is covered with one of the tatami mats that form the surface of the floor, and is not visible.

=== Okiro ===
An okiro is a portable ro that is set on the floor and is used in circumstances when the room does not have a ro that can be used.

== Kaiseki-related items ==
=== Choshi or kannabe ===
A choshi or kannabe is a kettle resembling a teapot used for warming and serving sake. They are made of iron, tin or pottery.

== Kakemono ==
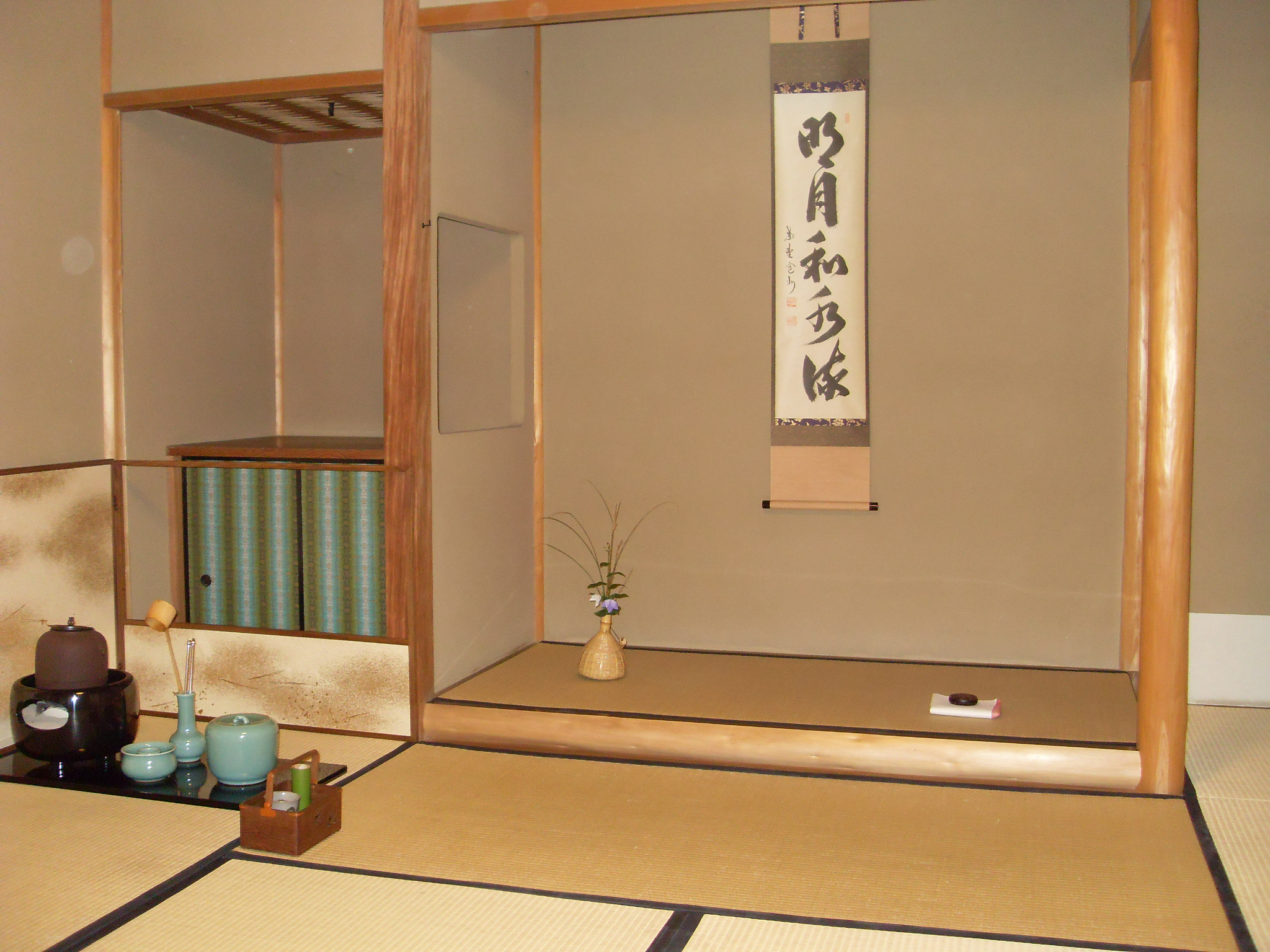
Kakemono hanging in the tokonoma of a tearoom in Uji, with tea utensils to the left

Kakemono (掛物) literally meaning "hanging thing", refers to a painting or calligraphic work mounted on paper or textile, for hanging in the tokonoma alcove. The kakemono is the centerpiece of the tea room. Zen calligraphic works are referred to as bokuseki (墨蹟, lit. 'ink traces'). In chanoyu, bokuseki are particularly highly esteemed for kakemono.

== Karamono ==
Karamono (唐物, lit. 'Tang item') is a term used for refined quality tea implements, mainly ceramics, produced in China particularly in the Song dynasty, Yuan dynasty, and Ming dynasty, which when imported to Japan were selected for their excellence and have been highly valued in Japan ever since. See also Chawan, Chaki.

== Kōraimono ==
Kōraimono (高麗物, lit. 'Goryeo item') is a term for tea utensils produced in the Korean Peninsula mainly during the Yi dynasty of Korea, occasionally compared with the above-mentioned karamono. See Chawan, Chaki.

== Kuniyakimono ==
Kuniyakimono (国焼物, lit. 'country-fired things') are ceramics made in Japan. More specifically, the term means "provincial ceramics," and does not include Kyoto-ware or Seto-ware ceramics.

== Miscellaneous items ==
=== Chakindarai ===
A chakindarai is a relatively small bowl, usually made of copper, used for rinsing and washing chakin. It is kept on the bamboo sink-covering in the mizuya.

=== Chasen kusenaoshi ===
A chasen kusenaoshi is a shaper for bamboo whisks. Kusenaoshi are made from wood or ceramic; a wet whisk is placed on the shaper and allowed to dry, restoring its shape. This item is used in the mizuya back room, and is not seen in the tea room.

=== Folding fan ===
Sensu (扇子, lit. 'small folding fan') (also known as ōgi (扇)) are carried by all participants in a chanoyu ceremony as a sign of respect. It is not opened and used for fanning. The fan, in its closed state, is placed in front of oneself when making formal statements or expressions of thanks, respect, apology, and such. During the main portions of a tea ceremony in which they are seated on the floor, guests place their fans on the floor directly behind themselves for instant use when required. For men, the standard length of sensu meant for tea ceremony is approximately 18 centimetres (7.1 in) (6 寸); for women, it is approximately 15 centimetres (5.9 in) (5 寸).

If the circumstance involves being seated on the floor, the closed fan is placed on the floor in front of the knees, leaving enough space in between to place the hands for the attendant bow. If the circumstance involves being in a standing position, the closed fan is held in the right hand, against the front of the right thigh, paired with the left hand which is held against the front of the left thigh, for the standing bow. The fan is normally tucked in the obi, to be available for instant use when required.

=== Futaoki ===
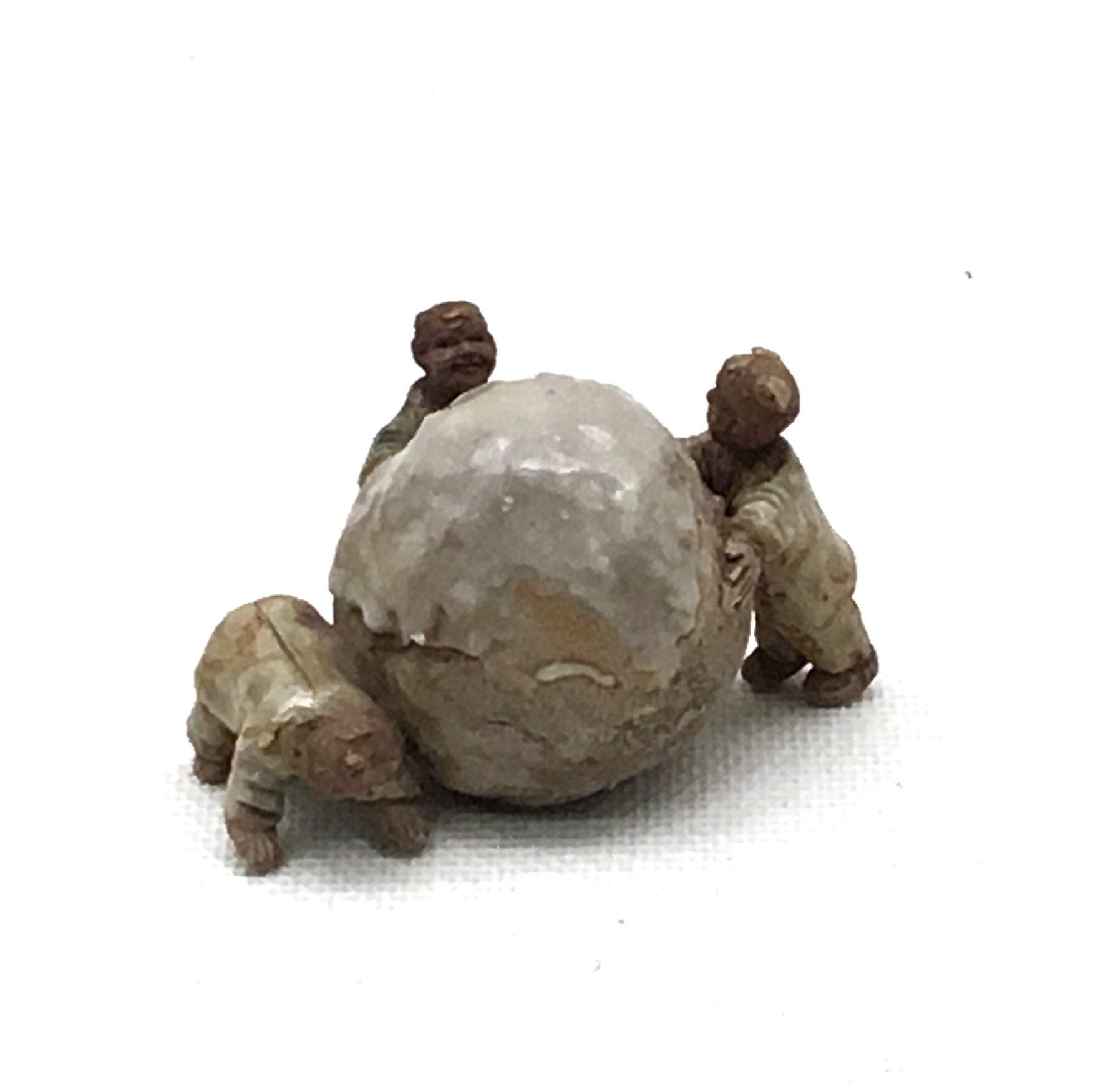
Ceramic lid rest futaoki with playing children with snowball, Kiseto style. By Masaki Sōzaburō and Iori, Edo period, 19th century, Nagoya

Futaoki (蓋置, lit. 'lid rest[s]') are for resting the lid of the kettle on, and also for resting the water ladle (hishaku) on. They are made of bamboo, ceramic, or metal. There are many styles.

There is a group of seven kinds of futaoki lid rests that are attributed to Sen no Rikyu (Rikyu no nanashu no futaoki). They are:

- Hoyakoro (censer)
- Gotoku (five virtues tripod)
- Ikkanjin (iddle person at well)
- Mitsuningyo (三人形, three dolls in Chinese style)
- Sazae (turban shell)
- Kani (crab)
- Mitsuba (tree leaves)

=== Gotoku ===
Gotoku (五徳) is a metal tripod on which the kettle is set.

=== Hanaire ===
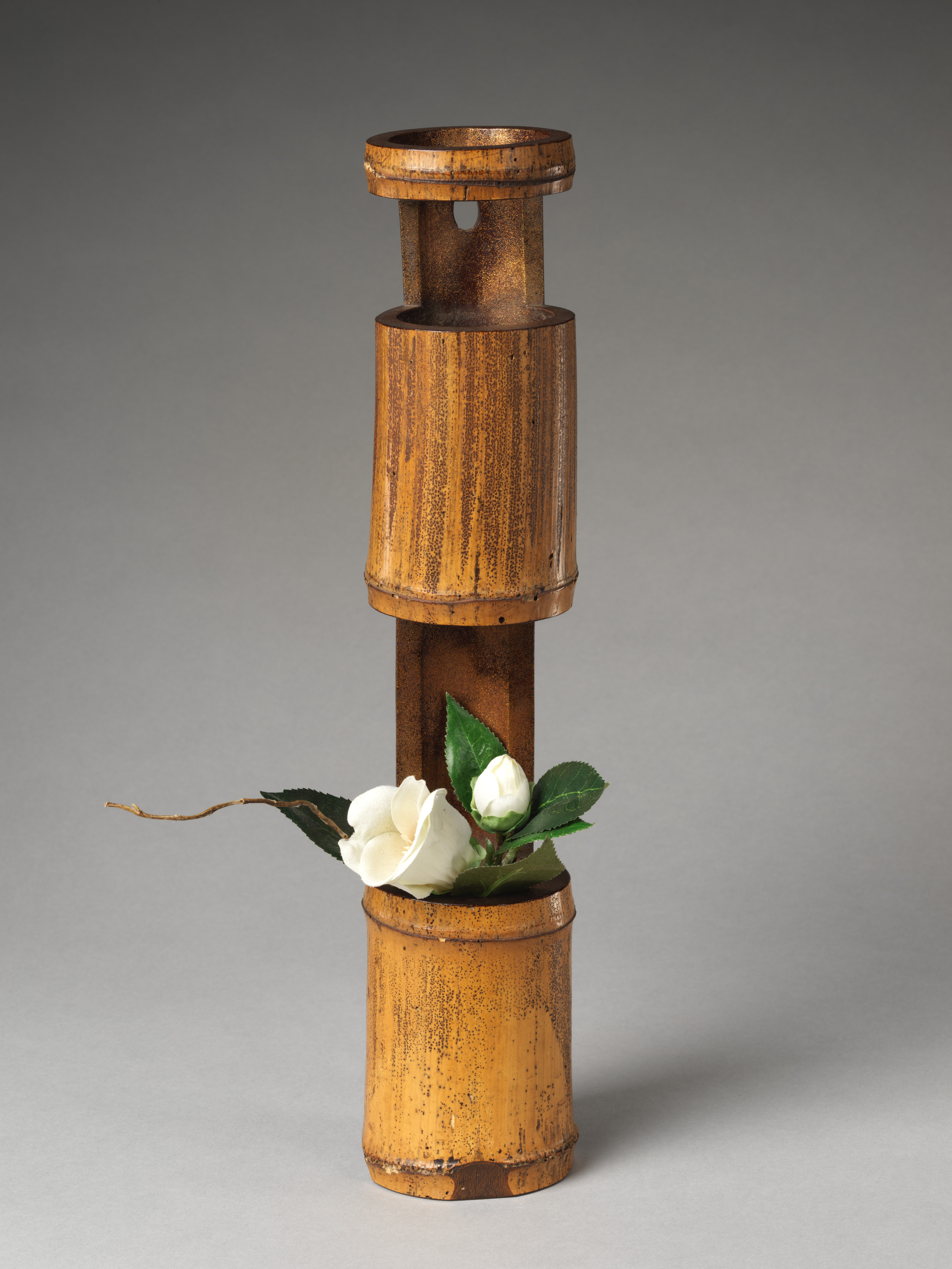
Double-cut (nijū-giri) hanaire made of bamboo, early 17th century (Edo period)

Flowers, together with their containers, are an important element of the decorations for the tea ceremony. The flowers arranged in the simple "thrown-in" (nageire) manner suitable for tea ceremony are called chabana (茶花), and the containers for them are generically referred to as hanaire (花入). Hanaire may be of bronze or other metal, celadon and other types of ceramic, bamboo, or basketry. Bamboo hanaire (take-hanaire) came into being with the development of wabi-cha, as did hanaire of domestic Japanese ceramic ware such as Bizen ware and Shigaraki ware. Basketry hanaire (kago-hanaire) usually are reserved for use in the warm season, when the chabana will consist of an assortment of seasonal grassy flowers. The chabana may be hung on the back wall of the tokonoma, or on its main front pillar (tokobashira), in which cases the hanaire will have a ring attached to the back, or a small hole in the back, for the hook. Also, there are metal and bamboo hanaire designed to be hung by a chain from a hook in the ceiling of the tokonoma. These are generally referred to as tsuri-hanaire, and if they are boat-like, they are referred to as tsuribune (suspended boat).

=== Kaishi ===
Kaishi (懐紙)(ja) is white paper used for miscellaneous purposes. It is usually in the form of a pad of paper folded in half. The name indicates that it is paper kept handy in the bosom overlap of the kimono.

=== Kamashiki ===
Kamashiki (釜敷) means "kettle mat". When the kettle is removed from the brazier or sunken hearth to conduct the charcoal-laying procedure (sumidemae), the kettle is placed on a kamashiki. Ones of woven material are called kumikamashiki (lit. 'woven kamashiki'). Ones consisting of a special thick pad of paper are called kamikamashiki (lit. 'paper kamashiki'). There are also ones of bamboo, called takekamashiki, which are for use in the preparation room.

=== Kensui ===
Kensui (建水) is the term for the rinse-water receptacle used by the host in the tea room. Usually made of metal or ceramic, though there are some made of lacquered bentwood. Water that has been used to rinse the tea bowl is emptied into it. It is kept out of sight of the guests as much as possible, being the last item brought into the tea room, and the first item removed. While the kensui is a necessary item for the tea ceremony, and is among the implements the host specially selects for the occasion, it is not among the "showpiece" items the guests are expected to specially notice. The kensui plays an analogous (but not identical) role to the slop bowl in a Western-style tea set.

=== Kintō ===
Kintō (巾筒) is a tube or vessel used to store a chakin cloth.

=== Screens ===
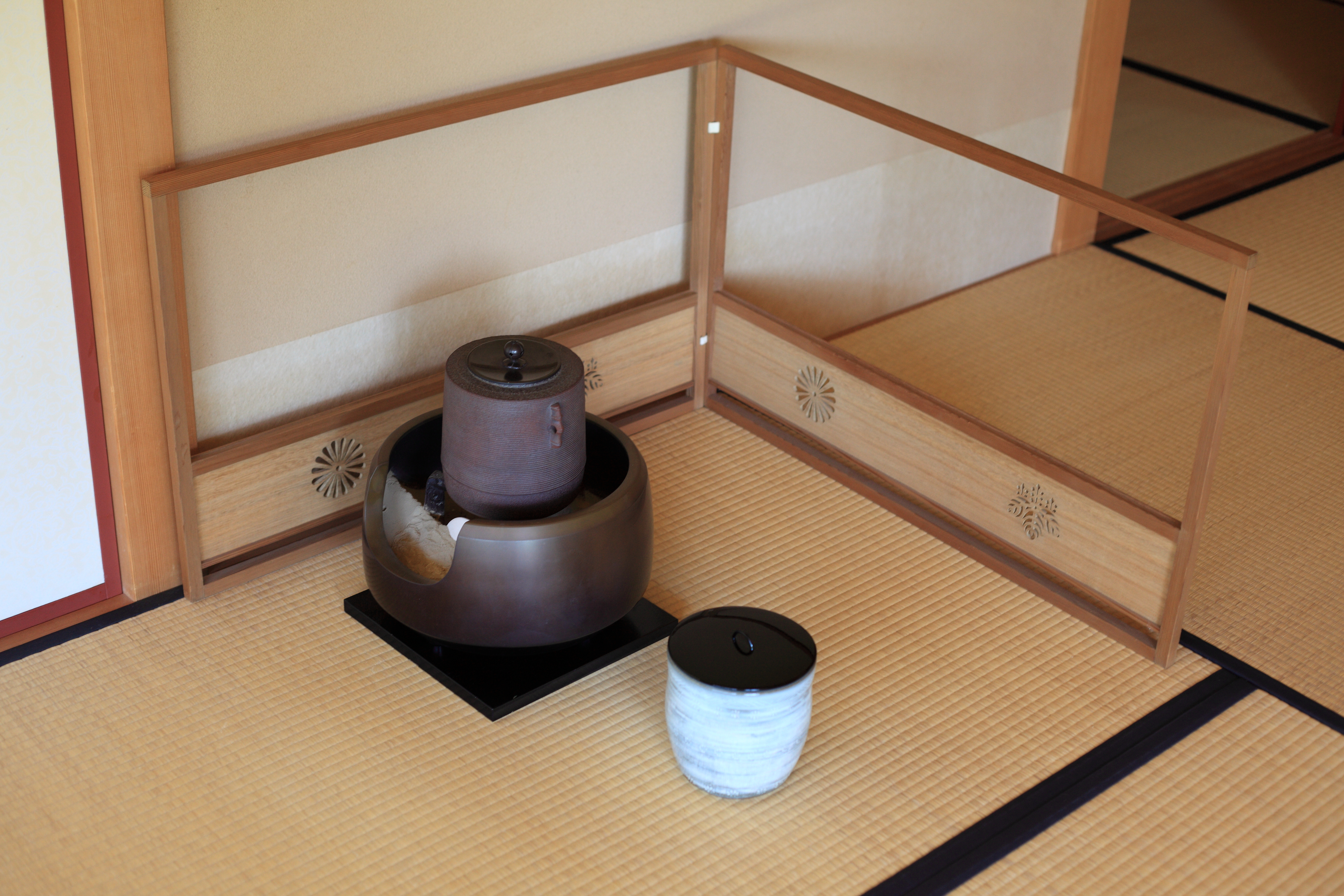
Furosaki byōbu surrounding a furo (brazier) with a chagama/rogama (teapot) upon it. In front of the furo is a mizusashi (water pot).

- Furosaki byōbu (風炉先屏風, lit. 'folding screen before the brazier') (sometimes shortened to furosaki). A relatively low folding screen of two panels, which is set in the corner at the head end of the tea-making tatami in cases when the tea-making is done in a room larger than 4.5 tatami in floor space.
- Kekkai (結界, lit. 'boundary marker'). A low fence-like device set at the head end of the tea-making tatami in cases when the tea-making is done in a room larger than 4.5 tatami in floor space or in an open area such as outdoors.

== Pots ==
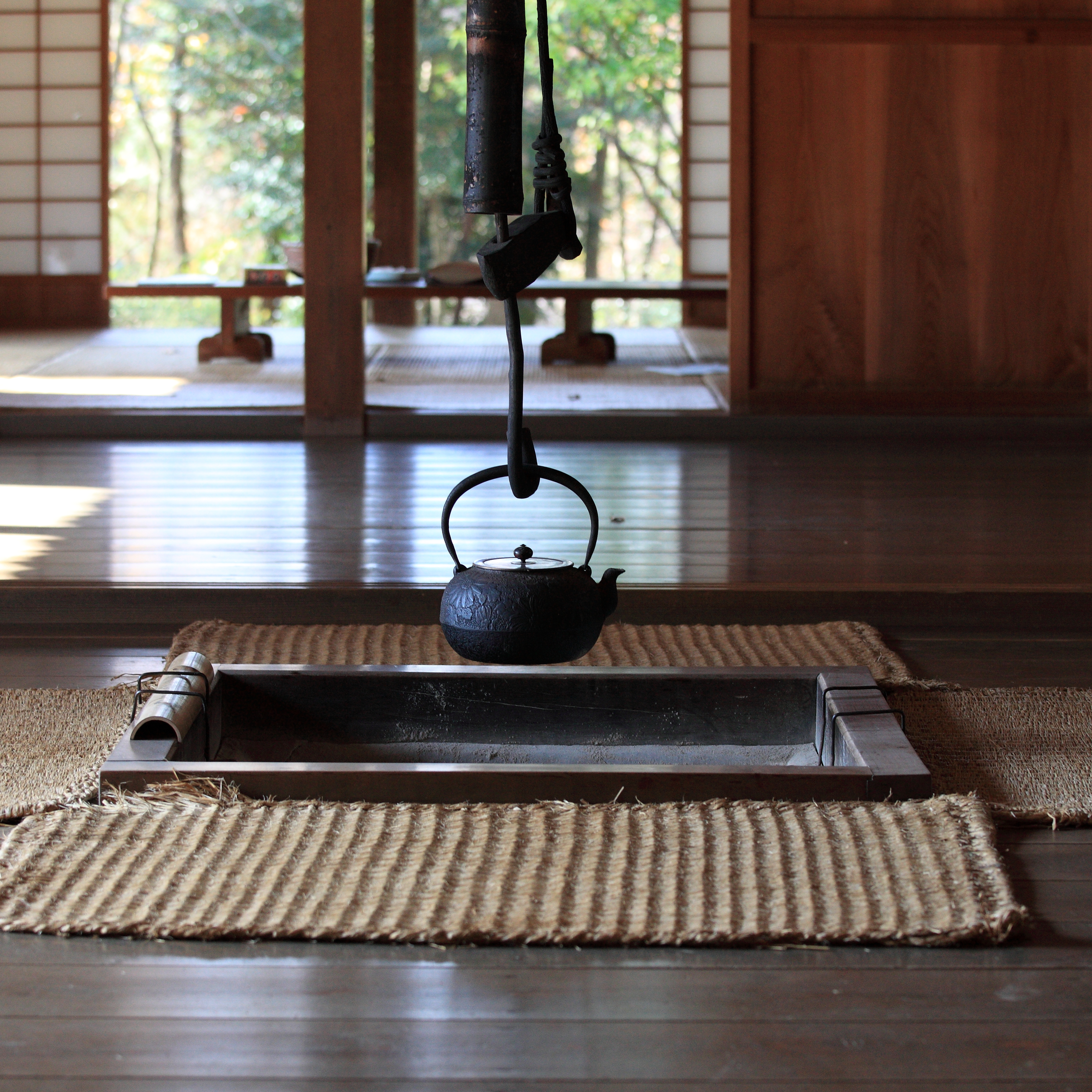
Tetsubin hanging over a ro (hearth)

=== Kama ===
Kama (釜) are pots, usually made of iron, in which the water used to make tea is heated.

=== Tetsubin ===
Tetsubin (鉄瓶) are iron pots having a pouring spout and handle that crosses over the top. They are used for heating and pouring the hot water during certain tea ceremonies.

== Shimamono ==
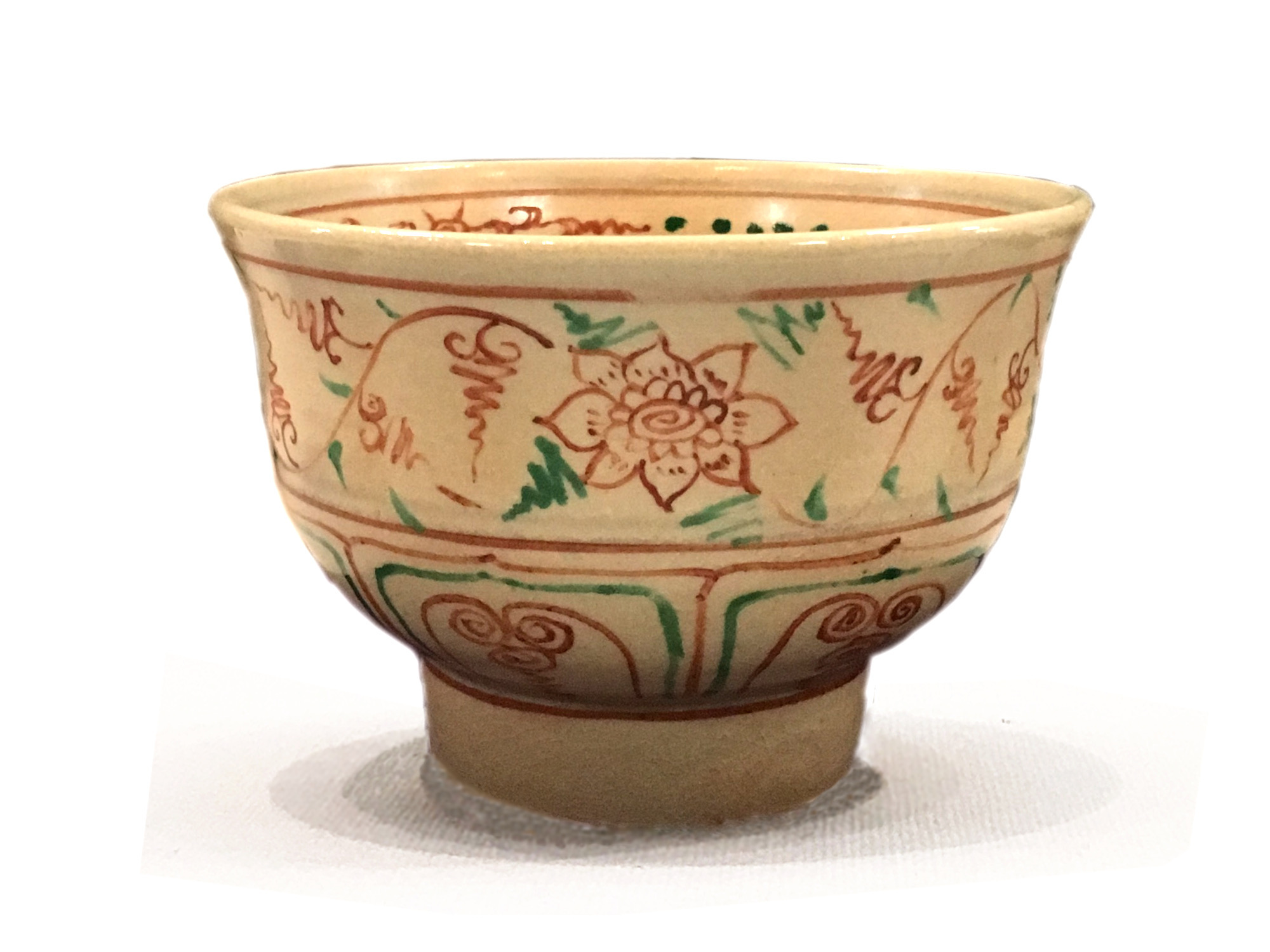
Annan ware with high foot, originally from Annam

Shimamono is a generic term for tea utensils produced outside Japan, Korea and China.

- Ruson (呂宋): items from the Philippines (Luzon)
- Annan (安南): items from Vietnam
- Nanban (南蛮): items from Southeast Asia
  - Hannera (ハンネラ): a type of simple unglazed ware from Southeast Asia
- Kinma (蒟醤): a style of lacquer ware that entered Japan from Thailand
- Sahari (砂張): an alloy of copper, lead, and tin. Some sahari items entered Japan from Southeast Asia.

== Smoking equipment ==
- Tabakobon (煙草盆, lit. 'tobacco tray'), the tray or box for the smoking set that the host provides the guests in the waiting room, at the waiting arbor, and in the tea room at the time of the "thin tea" service (usucha temae).
- Hiire (火入, lit. 'fire container'), a container for the lit charcoal that serves as the lighter. Usually made of ceramic. The tabakobon holds this hiire.
- Haifuki (灰吹), a bamboo tube that serves as the ash receptacle. The tabakobon holds this haifuki.
- Kiseru (煙管), a long-stemmed smoking pipe. The host provides this with the tabakobon.

== Sweet-related items ==
=== Fuchidaka ===
Fuchidaka Omogashi (縁高五重/菓子器), the "main sweet", is served before koicha. They might be served in fuchidaka, stacked boxes of up to five with one lid, a sort of medium level of formality. How many are used would depend on the number of guests at the tea ceremony.

=== Yōji ===
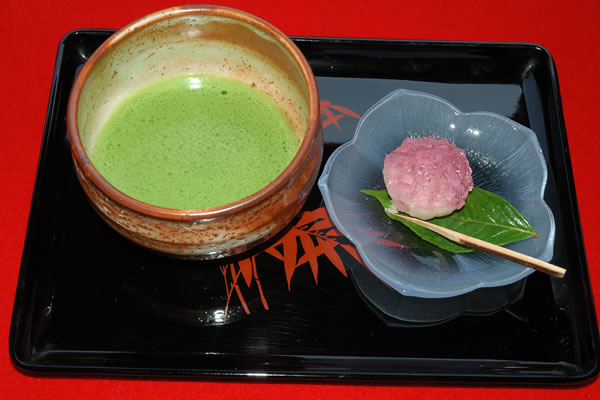
A yōji rests in the bowl on the right.

A yōji (楊枝) or kashiyōji (菓子楊枝) is a utensil used for cutting and eating sweets. There are two common types: a shorter metal style, and a longer wooden style called kuromoji (黒文字) after the type of tree they are traditionally made from.

== Tea bowls ==
Chawan (茶碗) are bowls used for making and drinking matcha tea. They can be classified by country of origin, by potter or kiln, by shape, or by the type of tea they are designed to hold.

== Tea containers ==
Tea containers refers to the small lidded caddies that are used to hold the powdered green tea (matcha) for the tea-making procedure (temae) in chanoyu.

The term chaki (茶器) literally translates as "tea implement," but in the vocabulary of chanoyu it usually implies the small lidded caddies that are used to hold the matcha for the tea-making procedure for usucha (thin tea).

All tea containers for usucha may be called usucha-ki. Usucha-ki usually are of lacquered or plain wood, although not necessarily so. Commonly they are of a variety of shape called natsume, and so all usucha-ki tend to be loosely referred to as natsume. Natsume and other forms of usucha-ki are classified by size or shape.

The ceramic caddies usually used to hold the powdered green tea for the procedure to make koicha (thick tea) are basically referred to as chaire (茶入, lit. 'tea container'). They may also be referred to as koicha-ki. Chaire are classified according to country of origin: import (karamono), Japan (wamono), or "island-make" (shimamono). The wamono ones are classified by potter, region, or kiln. All are also classified according to shape.

== Tea scoops ==
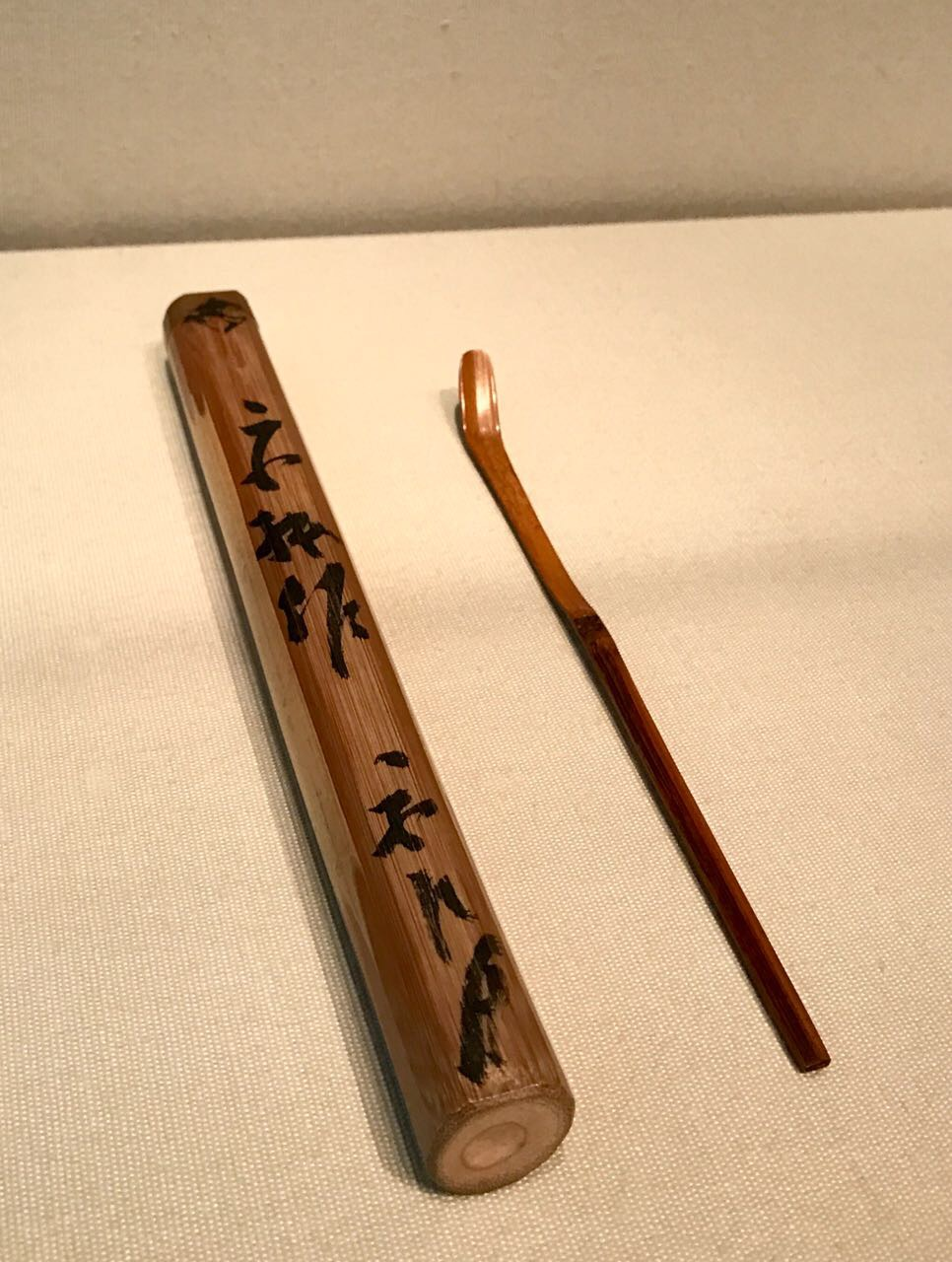
Chashaku

Chashaku (茶杓, lit. 'tea scoop[s]'); also called tea spoon(s), are used to transfer the powdered tea from the tea container (chaki) to the tea bowl (chawan).

Typically, tea scoops are made of a narrow, thin piece of bamboo, although there are also those made of wood or ivory. They are generally about 18 centimetres (7.1 in) in length. The original ones imported to Japan from China were ivory. Tea masters in Japan have traditionally carved their own bamboo chashaku, providing them with a bamboo storage tube (tsutsu) as well as a poetic name (mei (銘)) that will often be inscribed on the storage tube. The selection of the chashaku for use at a chanoyu gathering will largely depend on its poetic name.

Ivory has historically been a valued material in tea ceremony utensils, particularly for chashaku (tea scoops) and the lids of chaire (tea caddies). In the hierarchy of tea utensils, ivory scoops are often classified as shin (formal), the highest rank, distinguishing them from the bamboo scoops associated with wabi aesthetics.

However, the continued domestic trade of ivory for traditional Japanese arts, including tea ceremony, has faced scrutiny from international environmental organizations. Groups such as the Environmental Investigation Agency (EIA) and TRAFFIC have reported that Japan's domestic market lacks rigorous traceability for cut ivory pieces and finished products, potentially serving as a cover for illegal ivory trade. Critics argue that the persistent demand for high-status ivory implements in traditional culture undermines global efforts to combat elephant poaching.

== Trays ==
Various styles of trays are used in tea ceremony, including:

- Hakkebon (八卦盆), a round black-lacquered tray with mother-of-pearl inlay of the eight Chinese divination symbols.
- Yamamichibon (山道盆), a round tray having undulating rim like a mountain path (yamamichi).
- Yohōbon (四方盆, lit. 'square tray').

== Wamono ==
Wamono (和物) means "Japanese item"; an article produced in Japan. In chanoyu, the term traditionally is used in contrast to karamono or shimamono.

== Water containers ==
=== Mizusashi ===
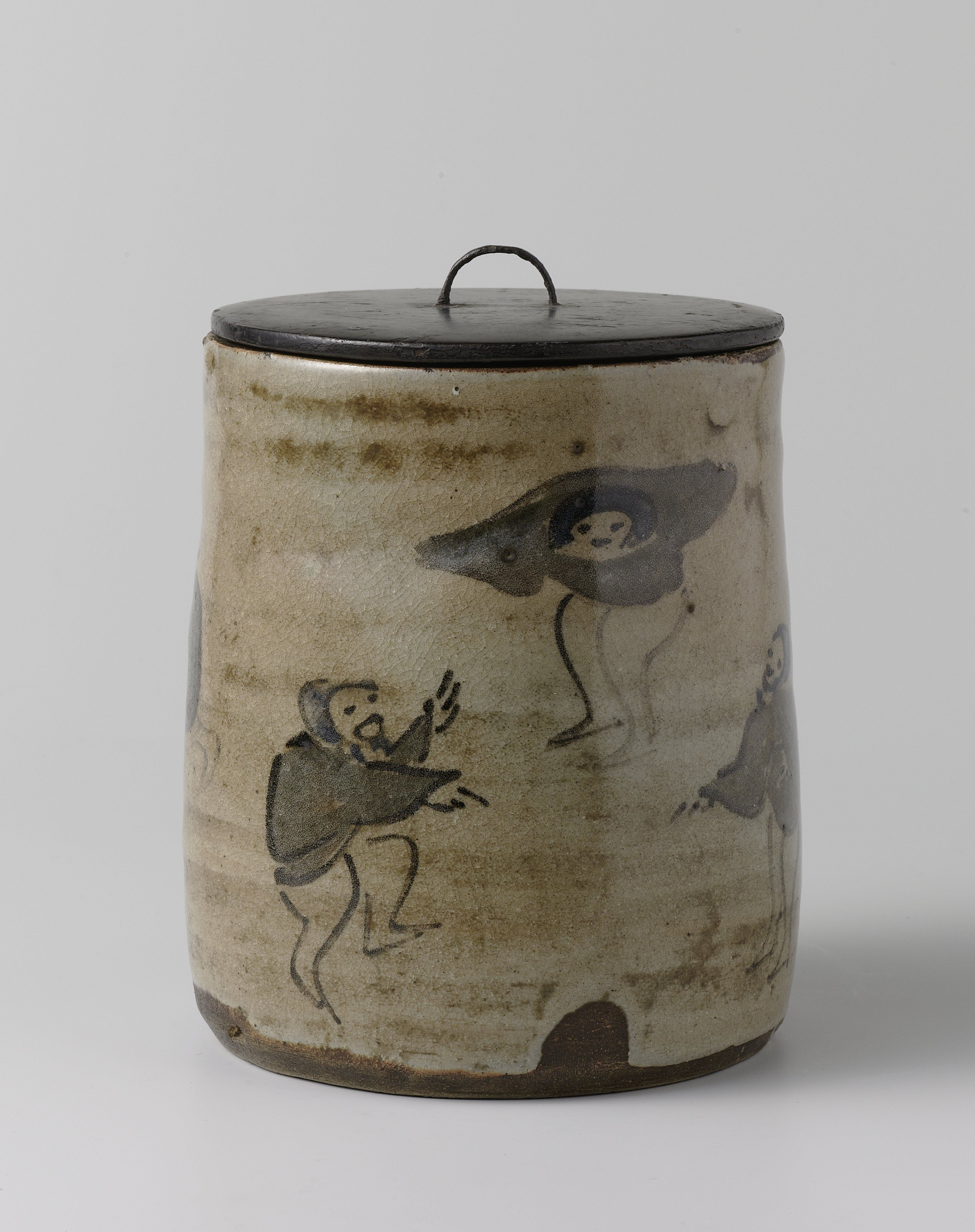
Mizusashi

A mizusashi (水指) is a lidded container for fresh cold water used by the host in the tea room during ceremonies. The water is mainly used to replenish the water in the kama at the end of certain ceremonies. Mizusashi are generally made of ceramic, but wooden, glass and metal mizusashi are also used.

If the mizusashi is ceramic and has a matching lid of the same ceramic, the lid is referred to as a tomobuta, or "matching lid". Often, a ceramic mizusashi will have a custom-made lid made of lacquered wood, especially if it is a container originally lacking a matching lid.

The mizusashi is one of the main objects in the aesthetic scheme of the objects the host selects for the particular occasion. Mizusashi are classified by their shape, place of make, and other characteristics.

=== Mizutsugi ===
A mizutsugi (水次, lit. 'water pourer') is a lidded water pitcher used to replenish the vessel for fresh water (mizusashi) at the end of certain ceremonies.

There are ones of metal, ones of ceramic, and ones of bentwood. There are two main kinds: katakuchi and yakan. The variety known as katakuchi is cylindrical, has a spout and handle, and matching lid. It may be made of bentwood, lacquered wood, or ceramic; the variety known as yakan is made of metal.

== Water ladles ==
Two hishaku

Hishaku (柄杓) is a long bamboo ladle with a nodule in the approximate center of the handle. It is used to pour hot water into the tea bowl from the iron pot (kama) and to transfer cold water from the fresh water container to the iron pot when required.

A tetsubin does not require the use of a hishaku. Different styles are used for different ceremonies and in different seasons. A larger version that is made of cypress wood is used for the ritual rinsing of hands and mouth by guests before entering the tea room, or for use by the host in the back preparation area of the tea room (mizuya), in which case it distinguished as mizuya-bishaku.

== Whisks ==
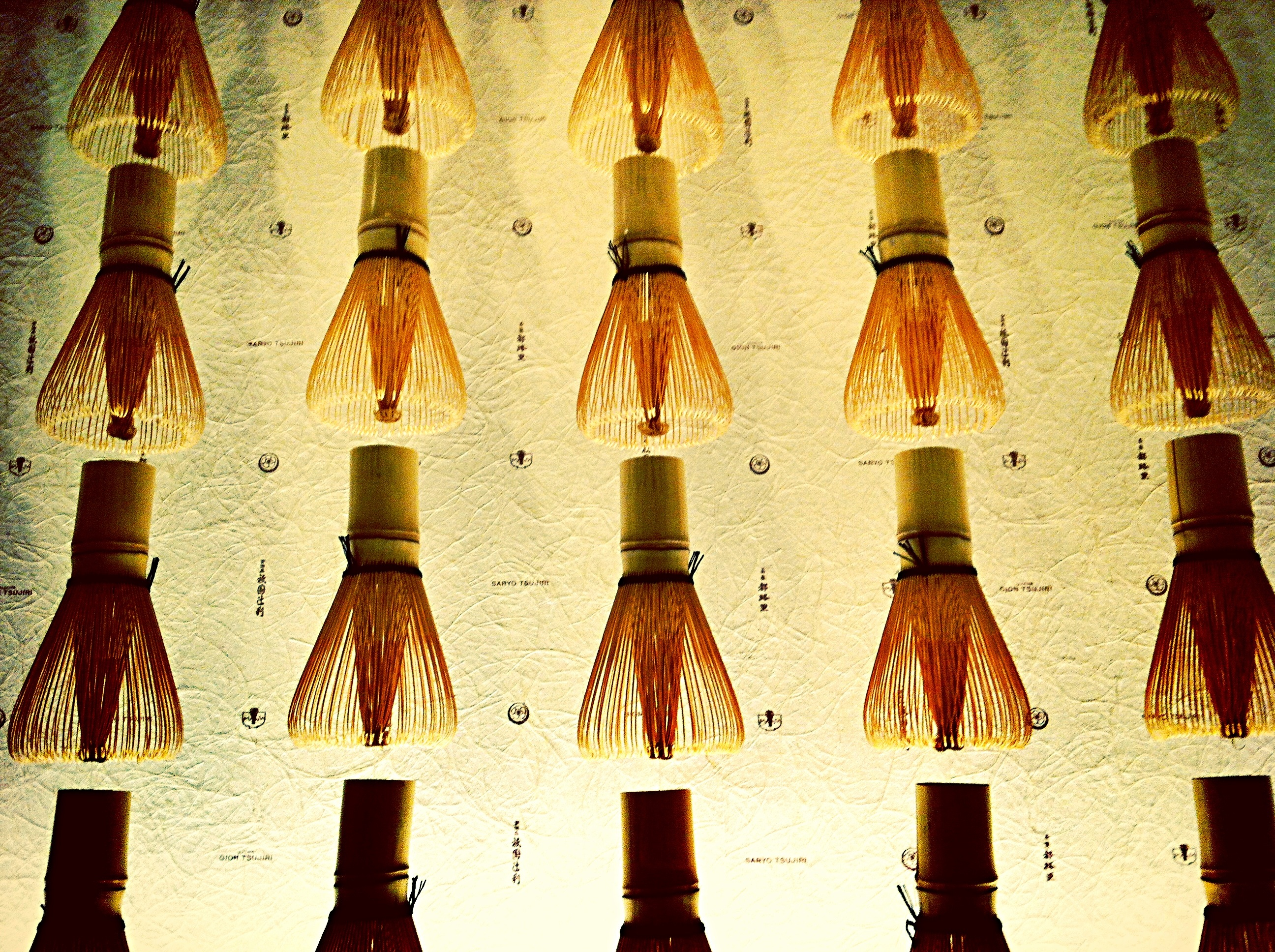
Chasen, Japanese tea whisks, displayed in Kyoto, Japan

Chasen (茶筅) are bamboo whisks used to prepare matcha. They are hand-carved from a single piece of bamboo. There are differences in their style according to the type of bamboo they are made from, the shape of the tines, the number of tines, the thickness of the bamboo, the length of the bamboo, the color of the thread that is woven around the bottom of the tines, and so on.

Different schools of chanoyu prefer different styles and employ different styles depending on the particular kind of tea or tea-preparation style for which it is to be used. For instance, there are specific styles for preparing thin tea (usucha), thick tea (koicha), tea offerings in tenmoku tea bowls, tea in tall cylindrical tea bowls, for including in a portable boxed tea set (chabako), for outdoor tea-making, for New Year's, and for other special auspicious occasions.

There are also styles such as the "Rikyū-gata" (利休形, Sen no Rikyū model); the style attributed to Sen no Rikyū's son Dōan and referred to as the "Dōan-gonomi" (道安好) style, and other such "favored" (konomi (好)) styles of famous tea masters, so that the styles have continued to increase.

Generally, the kind used for whisking thin tea (usucha) has 80, 100, or 120 fine tines, typically carved out of a flexible but robust bamboo such as Phyllostachys bambusoides (known as kashirodake or madake).

== See also ==
- History of tea in Japan
- Meibutsuki
- Japanese kitchen
- Kamado
- List of Traditional Crafts of Japan
