= Kintō =

Japanese tea utensil

Kintō (Japanese: 巾筒) is a small tube or vessel used to store a chakin cloth during the serving of tea. It is a part of Japanese tea utensils. The container is most often ceramic, but can also be made out of metal, lacquerware, or carved stone.

The chakin cloth is folded in a specific manner and then placed into the kintō. Some schools of Senchadō also use two-tiered stacked containers. In the case of sencha, a slightly larger cloth is used separately for wiping the tray.
