= Tetsubin =

Japanese cast iron kettle

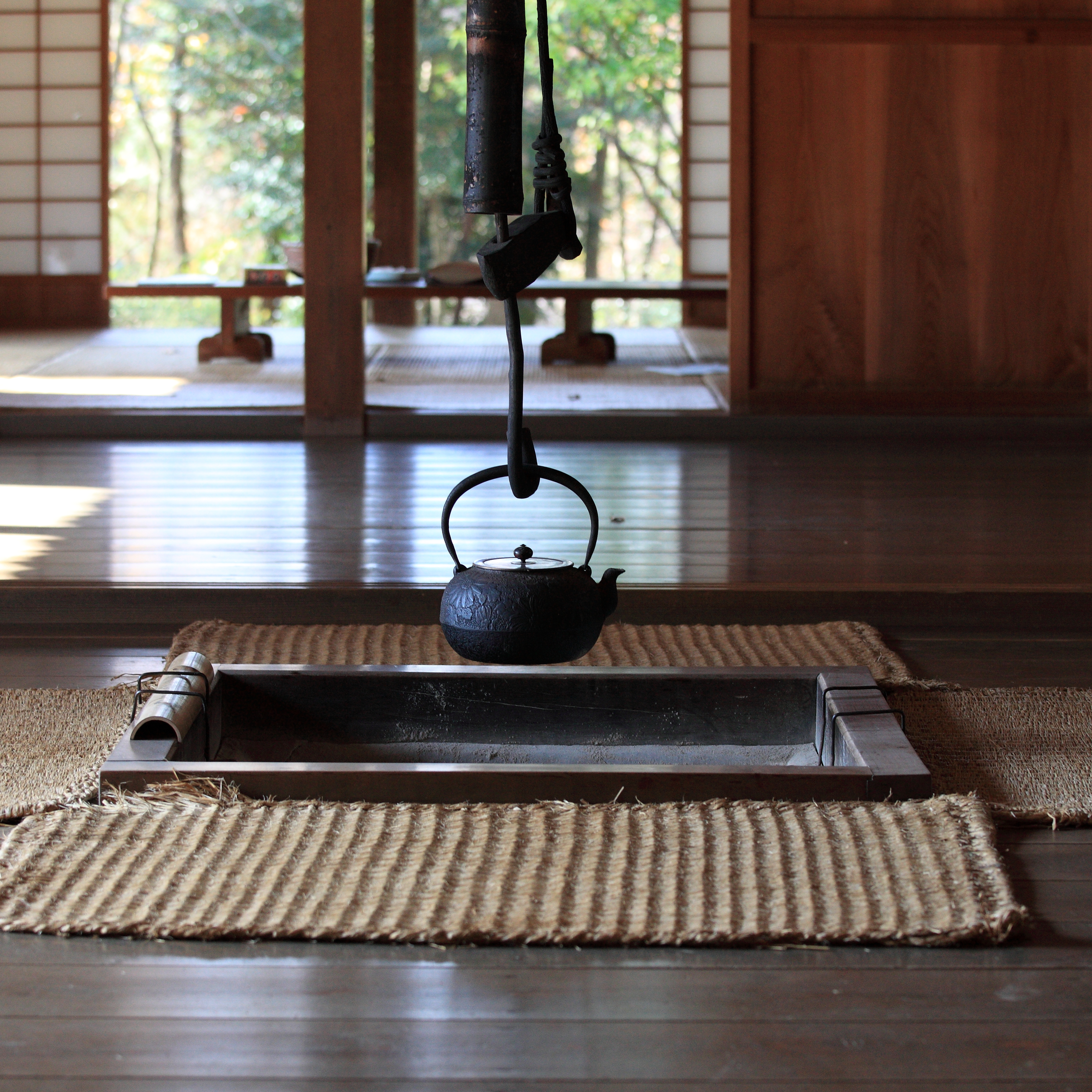
A tetsubin cast-iron kettle is suspended over an irori hearth in a traditional Japanese style farm house, at the Boso-no-Mura Museum

A tetsubin on a brazier (hibachi)

Tetsubin (鉄瓶) are Japanese cast-iron kettles with a pouring spout, a lid, and a handle crossing over the top, used for boiling and pouring hot water for drinking purposes, such as for making tea.

Tetsubin are traditionally heated over charcoal. In the Japanese art of chanoyu, the special portable brazier for this is the binkake (瓶掛). (See list of Japanese tea ceremony equipment). Tetsubin are often elaborately decorated with relief designs on the outside. They range widely in size, and many have unusual shapes, making them popular with collectors. A relatively small tetsubin may hold around 0.5 litres of water; large ones may hold around 5 litres.

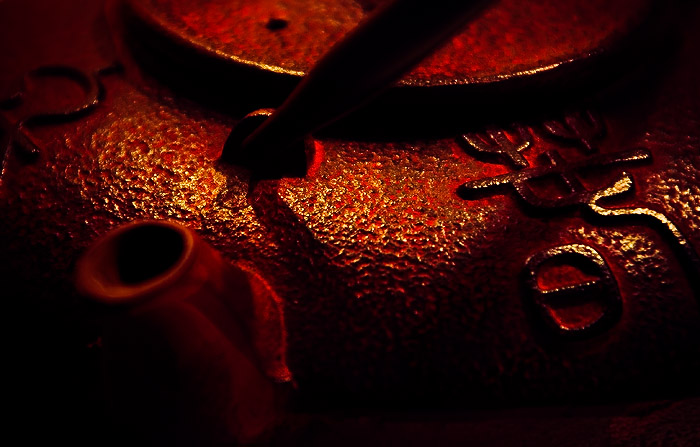
Tetsubin can be found in many colors with various designs and patterns such as this red one that has symbols depicting each of the four seasons for good luck

The historical origin of the tetsubin is not certain. At least one authoritative Japanese source states that it developed from the spouted and handled water kettle called tedorigama that was already being used in chanoyu in the era of Sen no Rikyū (1522–1591). During the 19th century, infused tea became more popular and tetsubin were considered primarily status symbols rather than functional kitchen items.

Outside Japan, a frequently seen variant is a cast-iron teapot that outwardly resembles a tetsubin. This type of teapot is glazed with enamel on the inside to make it more practical for tea brewing, though it cannot be used to heat water because that would break the enamel coating. In the west, these teapots are commonly referred to as tetsubin, although the Japanese call them tetsukyūsu (鉄急須), or iron teapot, to make a distinction from the kettle. Cast-iron teapots often come with a tea strainer that fits inside.

The prefectures of Iwate and Yamagata are best known for producing tetsubin as well as iron teapots.

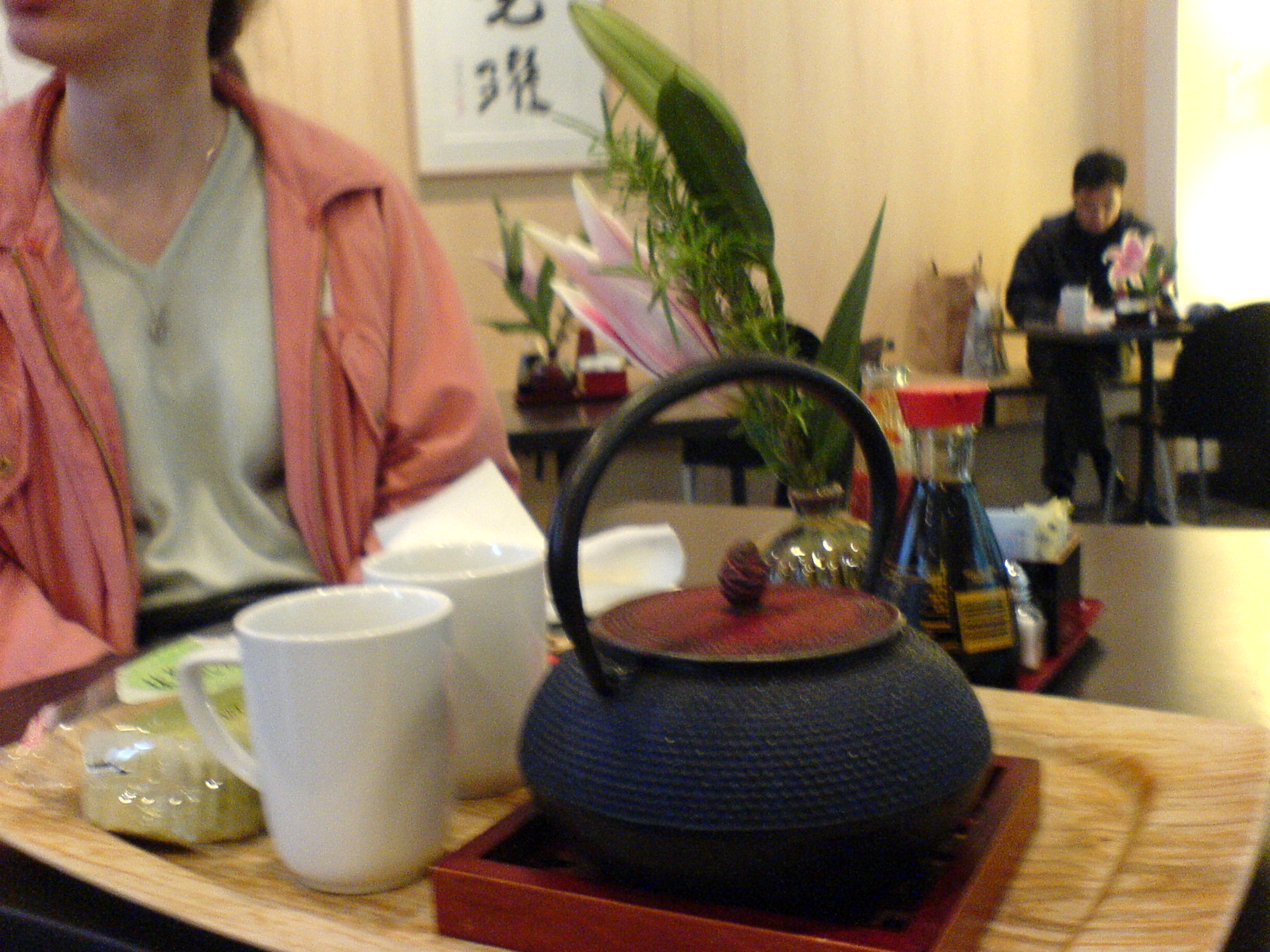
A modern cast-iron teapot in use at the Asian Art Museum of San Francisco café

== History ==
It is not clear when the first tetsubin kettles appeared in Japan, but one hypothesis is that the popularity of the tetsubin grew alongside sencha, a form of leaf tea. China introduced Japan to sencha around the middle of the 17th century. Sencha was not considered as formal as matcha, the common powdered green tea at the time. Throughout the 18th century, people started drinking sencha as an informal setting for sharing a cup of tea with friends or family. As more people drank sencha, the popularity of the tetsubin grew. The tetsubin is most probably not an original design, but rather shaped by other kettles around at the time. The five closest relatives to the tetsubin are the tedorikama, the toyama, the mizusosogi, the dobin, and the yakkan.

The yakkan is the closest relative to the tetsubin, the main difference is that the yakkan is made from copper, whereas tetsubins are traditionally made out of iron. Some people have wondered why the tetsubin was developed, when a perfectly usable vessel such as the yakkan would have worked. Tea drinkers may have preferred the taste of water from an iron kettle over the taste of water from a copper kettle. Throughout the 18th century, tetsubin kettles became a standard household utensil for heating water to make tea with. As the use of these kettles increased, so too did the intricacy. During the 19th century, tetsubin designs went from simple basic iron kettles, to elaborately engraved masterpieces.

== See also ==
- Cast-iron cookware
- Japanese tea ceremony
- Kyūsu, Japanese teapots that typically have side handles
- Kettle, a vessel with a spout and handle, typically metal, used for heating water
- Teapot, a vessel with a spout and handle, typically ceramic, in which tea is brewed and served
