= Chair (disambiguation) =

A chair is a piece of furniture.

Chair or chairs may also refer to:

- Chair (academic), a professor, generally used to recognise academics who have significantly contributed to scholarship and research and/or progress and development of a university or of the wider community
  - Chair, a type of professorship in the United Kingdom
  - Endowed Chair, a type of professorship in the United States
  - Chair (Polish academic department), a division of a university or school faculty
- Chair (railway), part of a railtrack fastening system
- Chair (officer), the presiding officer of an organized group
- Chair conformation, a cyclohexane molecule shape
- Sedan chair, a chair carried through the streets
- Chair, a prize at an Eisteddfod
- Chair Airlines, a Swiss airline.
- Chair (sculpture), a public artwork
- De Chair, a surname

== See also ==
- Chaires (disambiguation)
- The Chair (disambiguation)
- Electric chair (disambiguation)
- The Chairs
- Chair Entertainment, a video game developer
