= Thomas Chaires =

American politician

Thomas Peter Chaires (March 12, 1847 – August 17, 1899) was a state legislator in Florida in both the Florida House of Representatives and Florida Senate.

== Biography ==
Chaires was born March 12, 1847 in Leon County, Florida to Green D. Chaires and Anna Maria Parkhill. He received most of his education in a seminary in Tallahassee and enlisted in Robert H. Gamble's Artillery before transferring to Scott's Cavalry. A few years after the war in 1868 he moved to Cedar Key, Florida and started farming and raising cattle, then moved to Old Town in 1870 to avoid an epidemic.

He was elected to the Florida House of Representatives as a Democrat in 1885 representing Lafayette County, and then the Florida Senate in 1887 and again in 1899.

== Personal life ==
Chaires died August 17, 1899 from issues with his liver. He was survived by his wife and three sons. One of his sons, McQueen Chaires, also became a state legislator in Florida.
