= The Chair =

The Chair may refer to:

- The Chair (Aintree Racecourse), a fence on the British horse racing course
- The Chair (film), 2007
- The Chair (game show), an American TV program
- "The Chair" (song), recorded by George Strait, 1985
- The Chair (2021 TV series), an American comedy-drama TV series
- "The Chair", a song by Living Colour from the 2009 album The Chair in the Doorway
- "The Chair", a song by Jars of Clay from the soundtrack to the film The Long Kiss Goodnight
- "The Chair", a 1949 furniture design by Hans J. Wegner
- The Chair, a 1998 book about chair design by Galen Cranz
- The Chair, a 2014 TV series by Starz

== See also ==
- Chair (disambiguation)
- The Chairs, a 1952 play by Eugène Ionesco
- Electric chair
