= McQueen Chaires =

American politician (1871–1959)

McQueen Chaires (15 February 1871 – 1959) was a state legislator in Florida. He represented Lafayette County, Florida in the Florida House of Representatives 1909 and 1917 legislative sessions. He was a Democrat. His photograph is part of a montage of 1917 Florida House legislators.

Chaires was a cattle rancher and a leading member of the Cattle Men's Association of Florida. In 1879 he was appointed as a Florida State Timber Agent. He was involved in the movement that resulted in the 1921 creation of Dixie County, Florida.

His father was Florida state legislator Thomas Chaires. His wife was Ruby Sheppard.
