= Takatori ware =

Type of Japanese pottery

Natsume tea caddy, 19th century

Takatori ware (高取焼, Takatori-yaki) is a stoneware ceramic type made in Fukuoka Prefecture.

== History ==
The Japanese ceramic known as Takatori ware was founded by Korean potters brought to Japan at the end of the sixteenth century in the Japanese invasions of Korea (1592–1598). From its founding until 1871, Takatori ware production was controlled and patronized by the Kuroda, lords of Chikuzen Province (now Fukuoka Prefecture). The earliest known kiln was built at the base of Mt. Takatori in Chikuzen between 1600 and 1606. Over the course of the seventeenth century, the site of Takatori production moved five times. In 1716, the workshop and kiln were moved to the Nishijin area west of the Kuroda castle at Fukuoka; there production remained until the abolition of the domain system in 1871. Later, probably in the nineteenth century, the Takatori style became known as one of the Seven Famous Kilns of Enshu, which made wares following the preferences of the tea ceremony master Kobori Enshū.
