= Chaki =

Caddies for matcha, used in Japanese tea ceremony

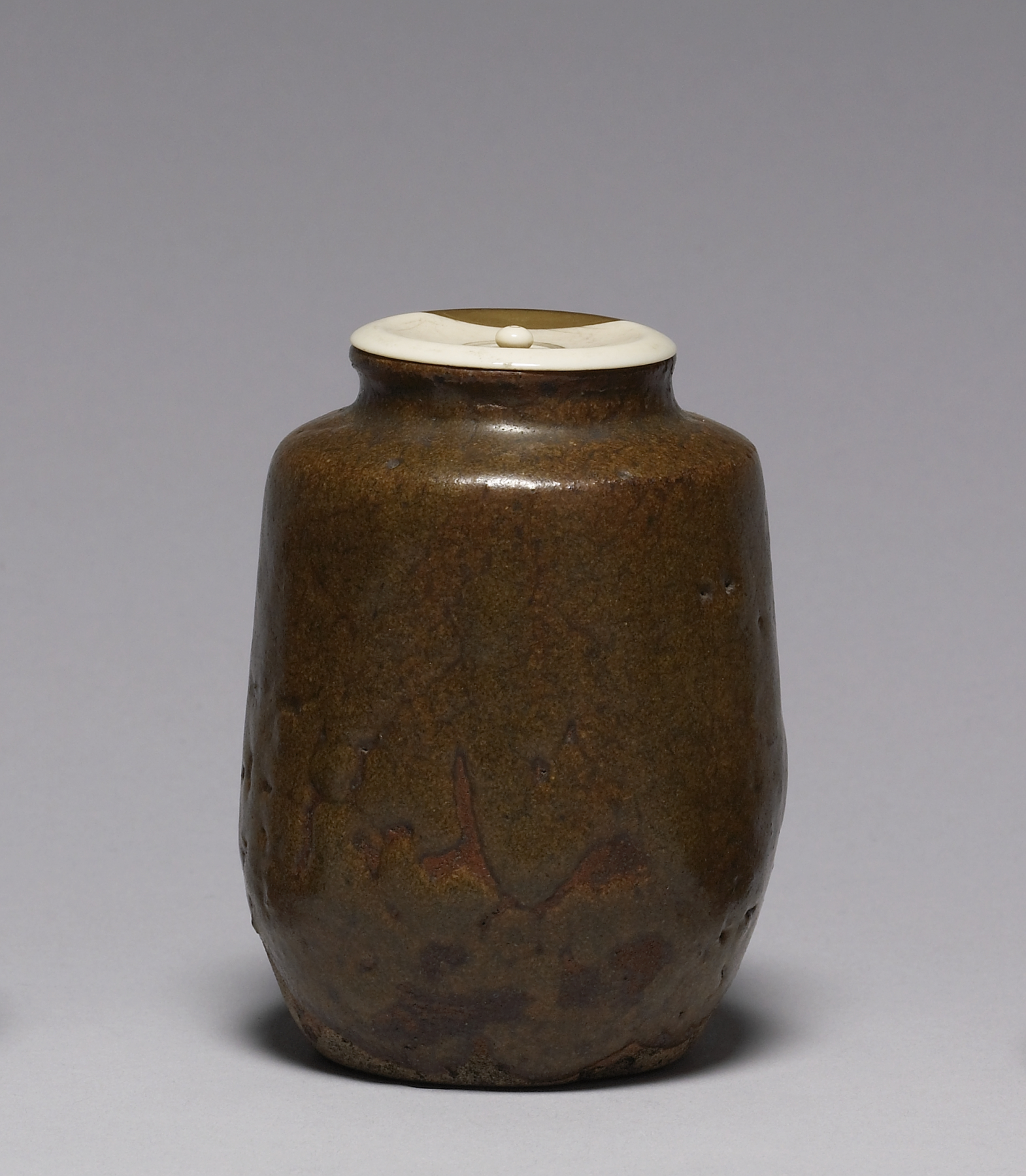
Tea caddy (chaire) in katatsuki (shouldered jar) form. Mino or Seto stoneware with iron glaze, ivory lid, Momoyama period c. 1590 and circa 1599

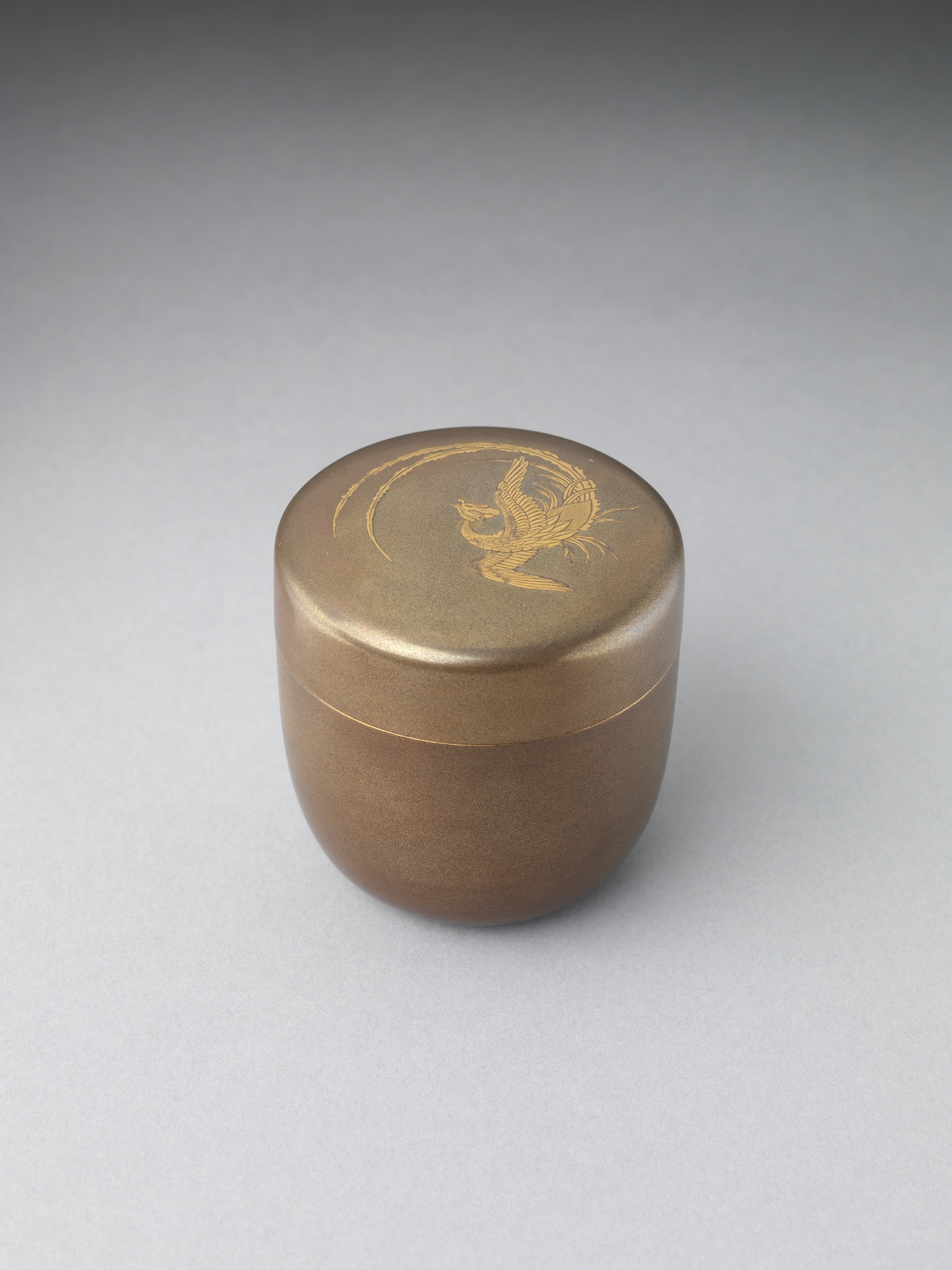
Tea container (natsume) with phoenix, Nashiji ground with gold maki-e, 19th century

Chaki (茶器) is a Japanese term that literally means "tea implement". In the vocabulary of Japanese tea ceremony, it broadly means (1) any implement used in the practice of chanoyu, and more narrowly means (2) the caddy for the powdered green tea (matcha) used in the tea-making procedures, although usually this implies (3) the caddies used in the procedures for making thin tea (usucha). In this article, the term applies to definition 2.

The caddies generally referred to as chaki are relatively small lidded containers, and are not storage vessels. In preparing to perform a tea-making procedure (temae), the host carefully selects the caddy for the matcha that will be used, and, as an important part of the preparations, neatly places the matcha into it. The chaki is chosen to harmonize with the other equipment used for the occasion, and the chaki is among the items the guests pay particular attention to.

Chaki are classified both by material and shape, as well as by the type of tea preparation (thin tea or thick tea) for which they are used.

== Styles and classification ==
Chaki can be divided into two broad categories: those made of ceramic, and those made of wood or bamboo. Normally, ceramic chaki are for use in the procedures to make thick tea (koicha), and are called chaire (茶入, "tea container")(ja) or koicha-ki (濃茶器; "implement for thick tea").

Wood or bamboo chaki normally are for use in the procedures to make thin tea, and are also called usucha-ki (薄茶器), "implement for thin tea," often abbreviated usuki). Commonly these are of the shape category called natsume (棗, "jujube"), and so usucha-ki in general tend to be loosely referred to as natsume.

Both chaire and natsume are further classified according to country of origin, materials and shape, and in some cases by potter or, in special cases, a name given to the object.

== Usucha-ki / natsume ==
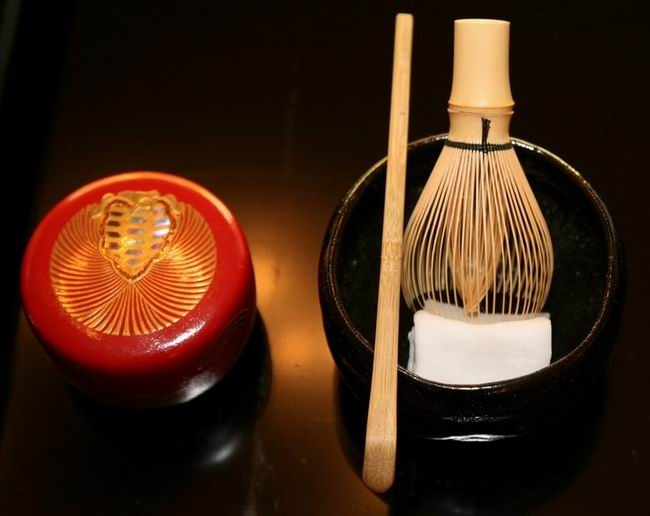
A red lacquered natsume next to a tea bowl (chawan), bamboo tea scoop and whisk of the Urasenke school

Broadly speaking, an usucha-ki is a wooden vessel with a lid, designed to hold powdered tea for making thin tea. Traditionally, usucha-ki are hand-carved from wood or bamboo, and usually are lacquered. They may also feature designs painted, applied, or carved into them, using for instance the maki-e or raden techniques. Today, cheaper, mass-produced plastic usucha-ki are also available.

The name natsume comes from the natsume or jujube fruit, which some usucha-ki are said to resemble. Strictly speaking, the word natsume should only be used to refer to vessels which have a slightly convex top and body that gradually narrows toward the base, but in practice any usucha-ki may be referred to as a natsume.

Since natsume are used for thin tea, they are the first chaki that a tea student learns to use.

=== History ===
A lacquer artist named Haneda Gorō, who lived in the era of Higashiyama culture and did lacquer work for Ashikaga Yoshimasa, is credited as the originator of this style of container for powdered tea which at first, as a rule, was black-lacquered. Records of tea gatherings held by Sen no Rikyū reveal that he used natsume, and that in his day natsume were used for koicha (thick tea).

=== Types ===
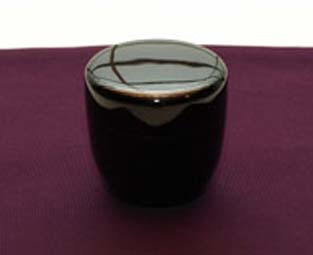
Rikyū-shape medium size natsume. Height: approx. 7.4 cm

The basic type is the "Rikyū shape" (利休形 Rikyū-gata), which comes in three sizes: large (大棗 ō-natsume), medium (中棗 chū-natsume), and small (小棗 ko-natsume). With the orthodox Rikyū-gata natsume, typically finished in plain black lacquer inside and out, the lid fits onto the body at about 7/10 the distance up from the base. There is tremendous variation among the other different types and sizes of natsume, however. For example, the diameter of the flat type (平棗 hira-natsume) generally is about twice the dimension of the vessel's height.

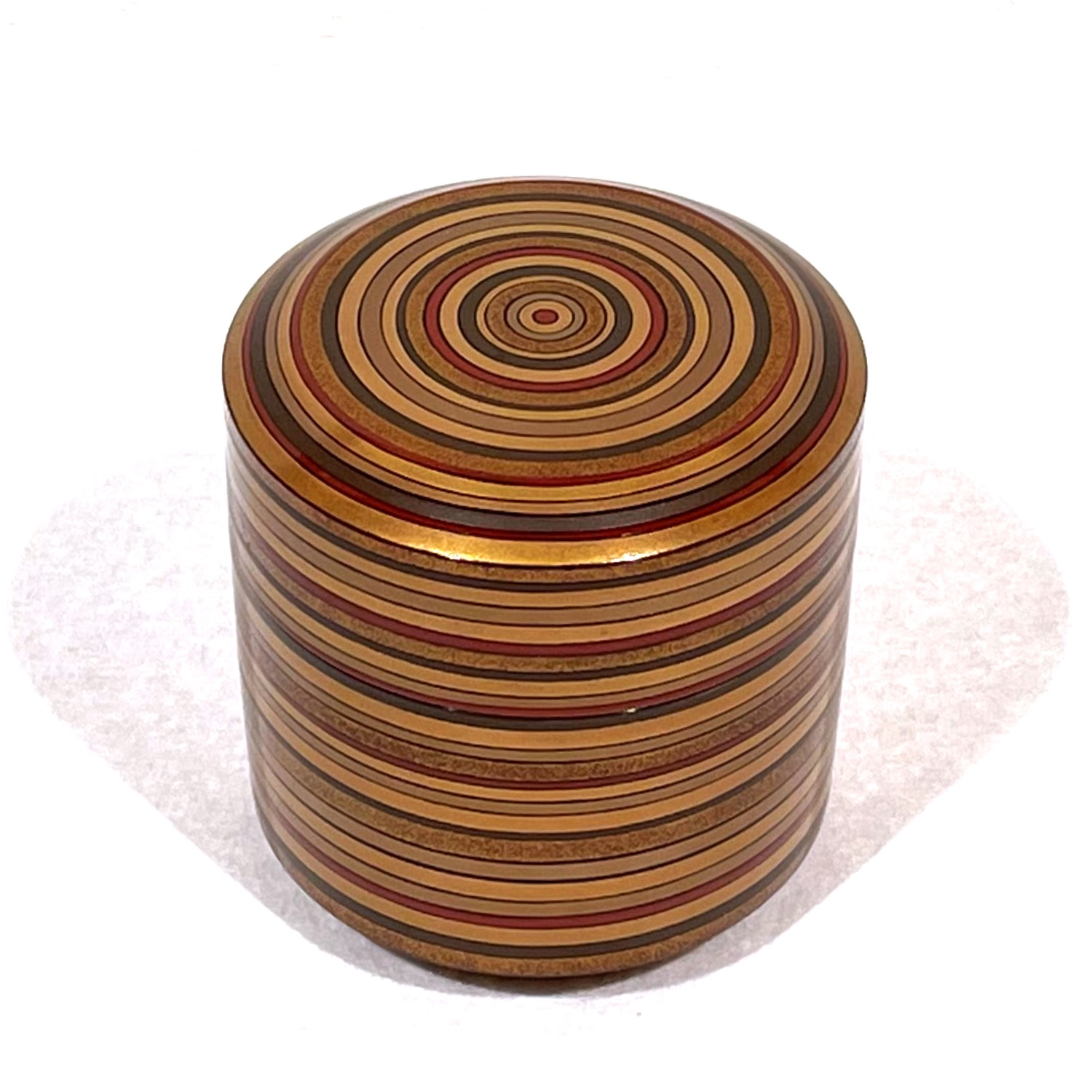
Koma tea caddy lacquerware

Koma (独楽) is the name for a spinning top. Originally from southeast Asia, it also became a popular motif. It can be categorised as a shimamono.

Kōdai-ji bun natsume (高台寺文棗) is named after Kōdai-ji in Kyoto and features the imperial chrysanthemum seal and the paulownia seal of the regent Toyotomi Hideyoshi.

== Chaire ==
The most important pottery of the Cha-no-yu is first the Cha-ire and then the Cha-wan. It is said that among the military class the most precious possessions were first Tea-caddies, second writings and third swords. For this was the order in which they were presented by the Shogun to one he desired to honour.

— A. L. Sadler.

The term chaire (茶入) generally refers to a relatively small ceramic jar with a lid, used to hold the tea powder for use in making thick tea (koicha). Historically, the lid, which is custom-made to fit the jar, is made from elephant ivory with a gold leaf underside. This traditional use of ivory links the utensil to contemporary conservation debates and the global illegal ivory trade. Contemporary lids are usually created from other materials made to resemble ivory.

=== History ===
According to Sadler, chaire were originally used in China in the Song period as bottles for oil or medicine, and were imported into Japan for use as tea caddies up to the end of the Ashikaga or start of the Tokugawa period.

=== Types ===
Chaire can be divided into two broad types: karamono and wamono (sometimes referred to as kuniyakimono). Karamono are chaire that originated in or are made to resemble those created in China, while wamono are those that originated in Japan. These can be further subdivided by kiln or potter as well as shape.

==== Karamono ====
Karamono chaire are classified by shape:

- Nasu (茄子): The "eggplant" chaire is a medium-sized vessel named for its shape, which resembles that of an aubergine.
- Bunrin (文琳): The "apple" chaire shape.
- Bunna (文茄): The "apple-eggplant" chaire shape, falling between the nasu and bunrin shapes.
- Katatsuki' (肩衝): The "protruding shoulder" chaire, the most common type, named for its pronounced "shoulders" at the vessel's top.
- Marutsubo (丸壺): The "round jar" shape.
- Taikai (大海): The "big ocean" chaire, which is quite large in diameter and has a wide mouth, in comparison to its height. A smaller sub-type of this shape is known as naikai or uchiumi (内海).
- Tsurukubi (鶴首): The "crane's neck" chaire that has a long slender neck.
- Shiribukura (尻膨), also referred to as shirihari/shiribari (尻張): The "bulging hip" chaire shape, distinguished by its wide lower portion.

==== Wamono ====
Wamono chaire are classified by the names of kilns (production centers) and potters. The kilns in Seto, in the old province of Owari (present Aichi Prefecture), are considered the original Japanese kilns to produce chaire, and so traditionally the chaire from the Seto kilns do not fall into the category called kuniyakimono or "provincial ware". Also, the various kilns in Kyoto are not regarded as "provincial ware".

===== Provincial ware (kuniyakimono) =====
- Karatsu ware
- Satsuma ware
- Shigaraki ware
- Sobokai ware
- Takatori ware
- Tanba ware
- Bizen ware
- Shidoro ware
- Zeze ware

===== Potters =====
- Maemon
- Genjūrō
- Shinbei
- Tōshirō I, II, III, IV

== See also ==
- List of Japanese tea ceremony utensils
