= Electric chair (disambiguation) =

Electric chair is a chair that a condemned prisoner is strapped in and electrocuted.

Electric chair may also refer to:

- Organizations for the disabled sometimes use "electric chair" to mean an electric-powered wheelchair, or an armchair with electric-powered ability to tip forward and sometimes also to rotate.
- Electric chair, a wrestling hold
- Electric chair lift, meaning an electric-powered stairlift
- Big Electric Chair, a 1967 series of paintings by pop artist Andy Warhol

== Music ==
- Electric Chair (album), a compilation album by Australian rock group Hoodoo Gurus
- "Electric Chair", a song by Steelheart from Wait
- "Electric Chair", a 1989 song by Prince from the album Batman
- Wayne County & the Electric Chairs, a punk band, founded around 1976
