= Cabaret service =

Small tea or coffee service

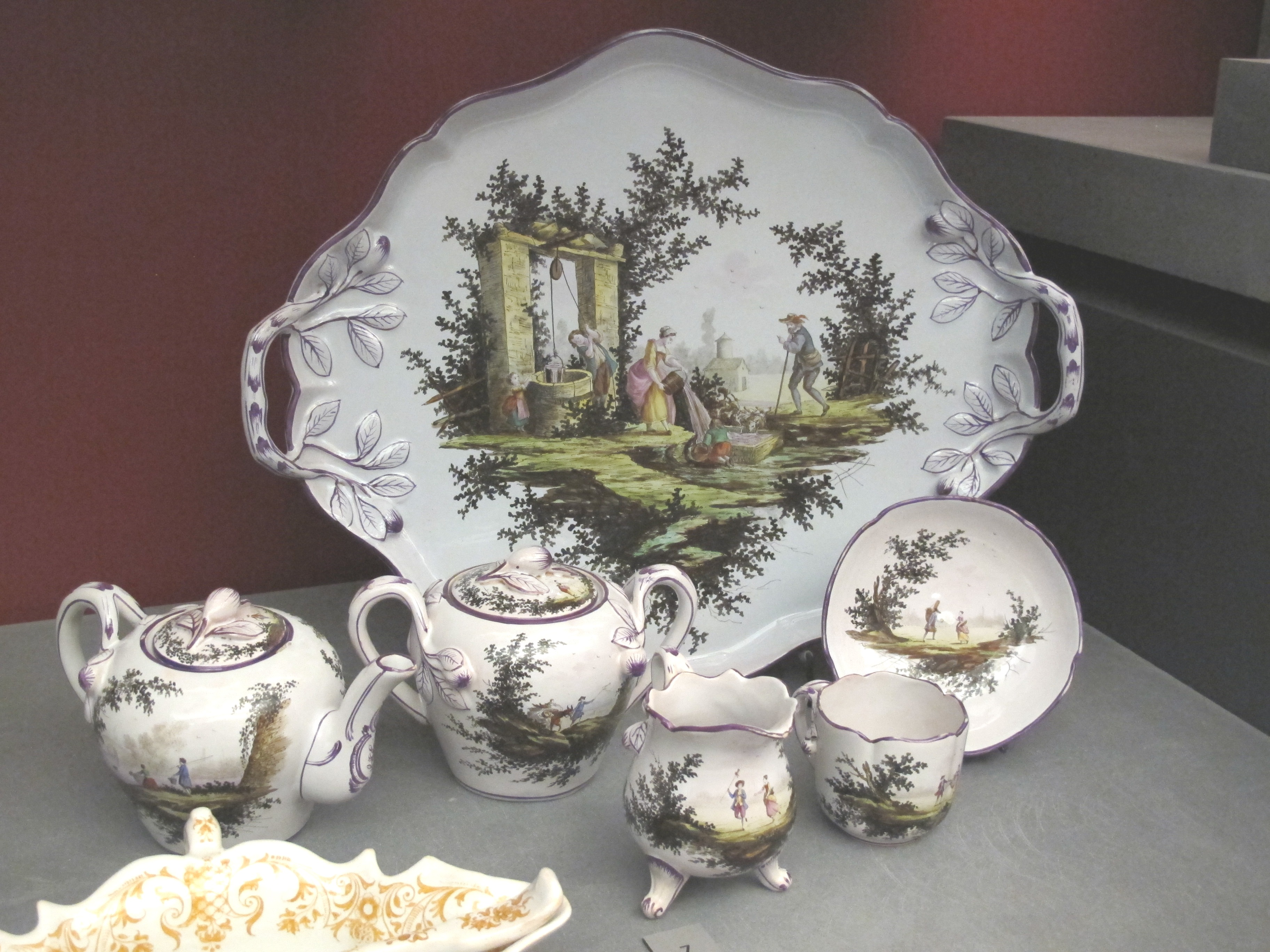
Cabaret service (ca. 1865)

The cabaret service (also known as dejeuner service) is a small tea or coffee service. A typical cabaret service includes (in addition to cups and saucers) a teapot or a coffeepot (with a lid and occasionally a stand), a sugar bowl, a creamer, sometimes a tray and cutlery. In the 18th century a spoon boat was frequently a part of the set. The tea- and coffeepots are small (one pint in a service for two, so called tête-à-tête, half a pint in a solitaire service for one), the cups and saucers are frequently also smaller than the ones in the regular sets. Tête-à-tête services were popular as wedding gifts.

The cabaret services originated in France, where the tea drinking was not ritualized, and thus small-scale arrangements for one or two were appropriate. The cabaret services characteristically utilized unusual designs and extensive decorations, this "jewel-like" appearance hints at marketing oriented towards ladies.

In the 18th century silver (gilded) cabaret services with fitting cases were made for travel.

== Sources ==
- Edwards, Howell G.M. (27 March 2017). Swansea and Nantgarw Porcelains: A Scientific Reappraisal (PDF). Springer. doi:10.1007/978-3-319-48713-7. ISBN 978-3-319-48713-7. OCLC 1005816953. S2CID 194409256.
- Edwards, Howell G.M. (5 May 2022). Welsh Armorial Porcelain: Nantgarw and Swansea Crested China (PDF). Springer Nature. doi:10.1007/978-3-030-97439-8. ISBN 978-3-03-097439-8. OCLC 1314428647. S2CID 248520004.
- Hildyard, R. J. C. (1999). European Ceramics. University of Pennsylvania Press. ISBN 978-0-8122-3505-0. OCLC 1034665423.
- Boger, Louise Ade; Boger, H. Batterson, eds. (1957). "Cabaret". The Dictionary of Antiques and the Decorative Arts: A Book of Reference for Glass, Furniture, Ceramics, Silver, Periods, Styles, Technical Terms, Etc. Scribner. p. 74. OCLC 1019976310.
