= Schuppe =

Schuppe is a surname. Notable people with the surname include:

- John Schuppe (fl. 1753–1773), Dutch silversmith working in London
- Marianne Schuppe (born 1959), vocalist, author, and composer
- Wilhelm Schuppe (1836–1913), German positivist philosopher
