= Polnalyubvi =

Russian musician (born 2000)

- Полналюбви
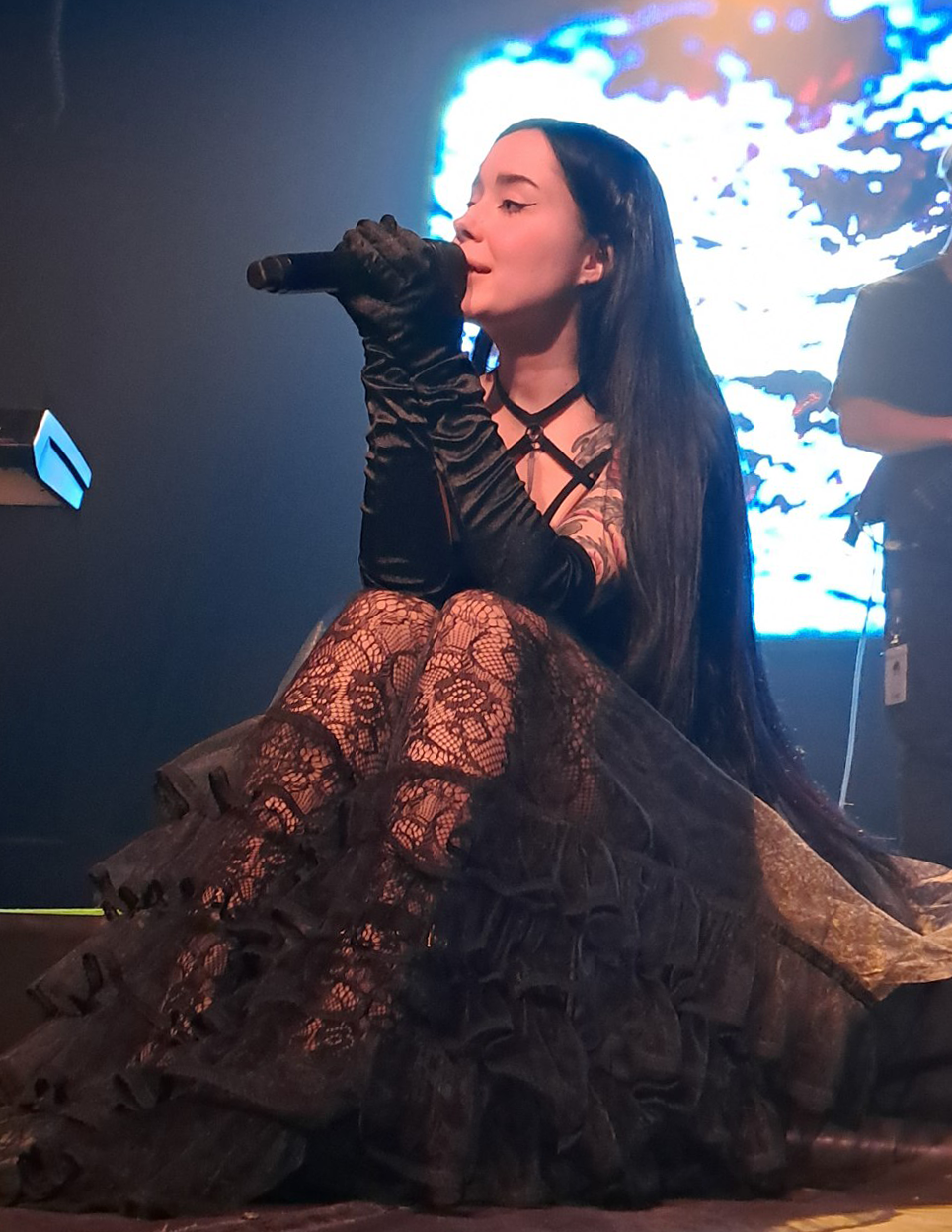
- Demeshchenko in 2025
- Born: Marina Valerievna Demeshchenko; 13 February 2000 (age 26); Anadyr, Chukotka Autonomous Okrug, Russia
- Musical career
- Genres: Indie
- Years active: 2016–present
- Label: Booking Machine

Signature
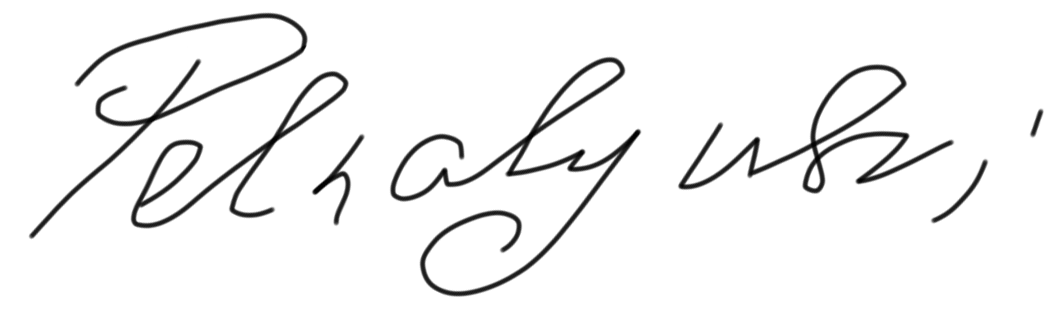

Marina Valerievna Demeshchenko (Russian: Марина Валерьевна Демещенко; born 13 February 2000), also known by her stage name Polnalyubvi (lit. 'full of love' in unspaced Russian), is a Russian singer of indie music. Born in Anadyr, she released her first album in 2017, and as of January 2026 has released seven full-length albums.

== Early life ==
Marina Valerievna Demeshchenko was born on 13 February 2000 in Anadyr, in the Chukotka Autonomous Okrug. She became involved with music at an early age, and began violin lessons aged four at a music school in Velikiye Luki. Alongside violin, Demeshchenko learned to sing, joining a choir. At thirteen, she graduated from the music school, moving to Saint Petersburg, where she studied Russian folk music. Demeshchenko wrote her first original song, "Hush, you see, my love is sleeping" (тише, видишь, спит моя любовь), in 2016. The song was written in an hour and a half, taking inspiration from a walk along the Gulf of Finland.

Demeschenko had taken part in some modelling work aged fifteen, but at sixteen, she began time for print modelling, and was advised by her friends to open an Instagram account, where she published photos and covers of her favourite songs. Although she had studied violin at music school, she later decided to learn guitar, buying her first instrument with money she earned busking with her violin in metro stations. Gaining popularity from her Instagram posts, she performed her first house concert at the anti-café Ziferblat in 2017, which was attended by eighty people.

== Career ==
By that point, Demeshchenko had begun to release original repertoire, and in 2017 released her debut studio album, V, at age seventeen. For this, she travelled to Moscow for two weeks to meet a follower of her Instagram page who had agreed to record her album free of charge, after she had posted an Instagram story expressing her difficulty in using music software. Demeshchenko stated that she had been particularly influenced by the work of Anna German and Vladimir Vysotsky, and that she was a fan of music by Zemfira, Mujuice, Mumiy Troll, and Splean.

In 2018, Demeshchenko completed her studies and announced the release of her second studio album, OFELIA. Her third album, Elegy (Элегия) was released on 31 October 2019; the album was released by Up!Up!Up!. Elegy included several songs sung in English, instead of in Russian, as Demeshchenko believed that many young people only listen to music in English. OFELIA received positive feedback from colta.ru, which described it as "romantically sublime arthouse pop".

In September 2020, Demeshchenko's fourth album, Tales of the Forest Nymph (Сказки лесной нимфы), was released. The album contained eight songs, two of which, "Comets" (Кометы) and "The Girl and the Sea" (Девочка и море), went viral on TikTok. The Music video for "Comets" was nominated in 2021 at the Berlin Music Video Awards. On colta.ru her music was described as "elvish pop", noting a shift away from minimalism to a style of large scale arrangements with deep bass and multi voice choruses, and rbc.ru described her music as "tragic pop with acoustic and electronic elements". On 29 September of that year, Demeshchenko appeared on the Russian late-night talk show Evening Urgant on Channel One Russia, performing the song "Comets".

In 2023, Demeshchenko released her fifth album, "What Your Heart Sings About" (О чём поёт твоё сердце), containing nine songs. Zen rated the album 8/10, describing it as "pop-goth with elements of guitar ballads and romances".

== Discography ==
- 2017 - V
- 2018 - OFELIA
- 2019 - Элегия
- 2020 - Сказки лесной нимфы
- 2023 - О чём поёт твоё сердце
- 2025 - Прощай и люби меня
- 2026 - Песнь Нимфеи

=== Singles ===
- 2020 - "Кометы"
- 2020 - "Девочка и море"
- 2021 - "Чужой среди своих"
- 2021 - "Твои глаза"
- 2022 - "Сирена"
- 2023 - "Успокой меня"
- 2023 - "Кукла"
- 2023 - "Одиночество"

=== Collaborations ===
- 2019 - WE (feat. polnalyubvi) - "32123"
- 2021 - Wildways (feat. polnalyubvi) - "Ветивер"
- 2022 - with KikoRiki - "Новогодняя колыбельная"
- 2023 - "Дно" (feat. Oligarkh)
- 2023 - polnalyubvi & Attaque de panique – "Дикий Райский Сад"
