= Spoon tray =

Tableware item for resting serving spoons

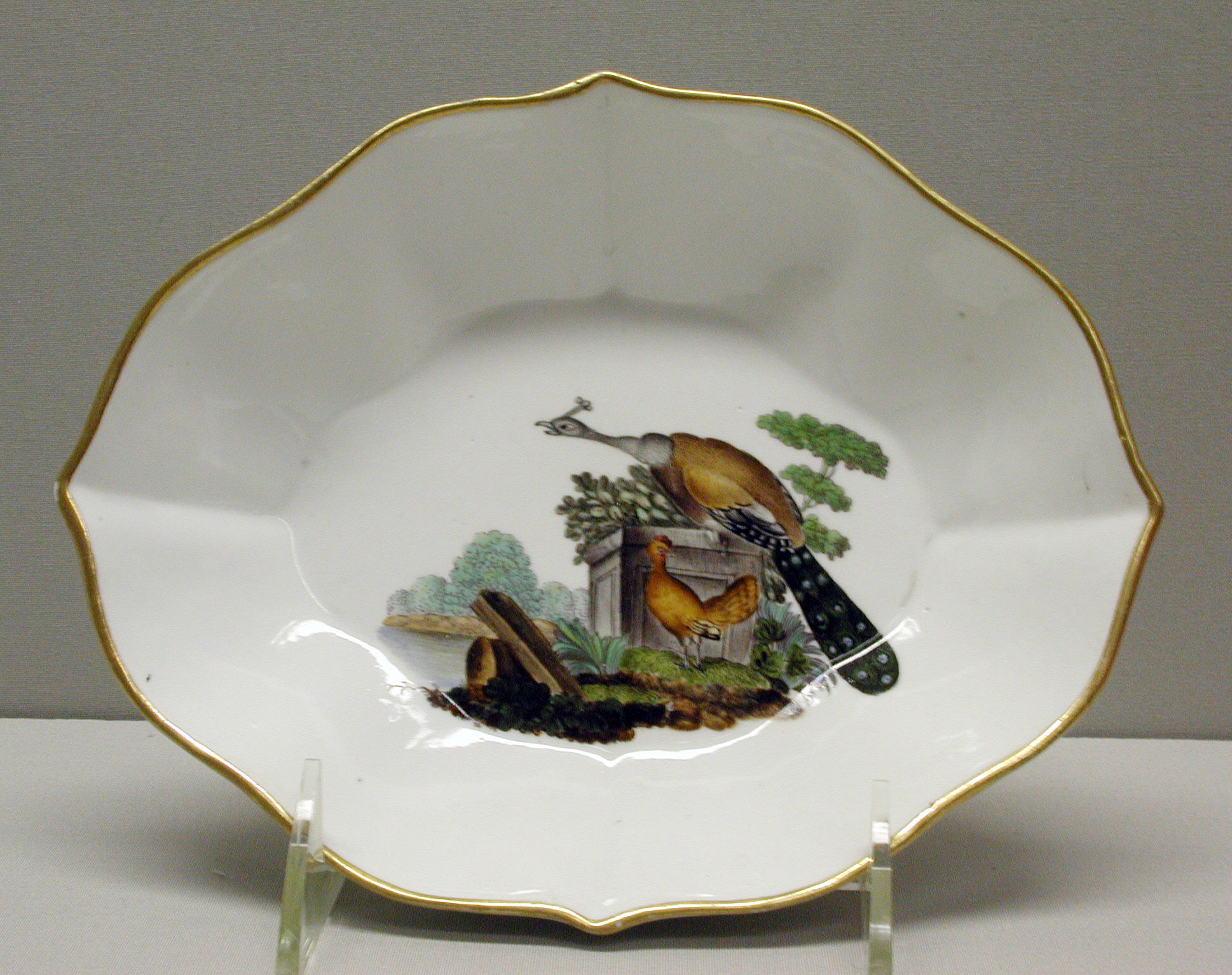
Porcelain spoon tray

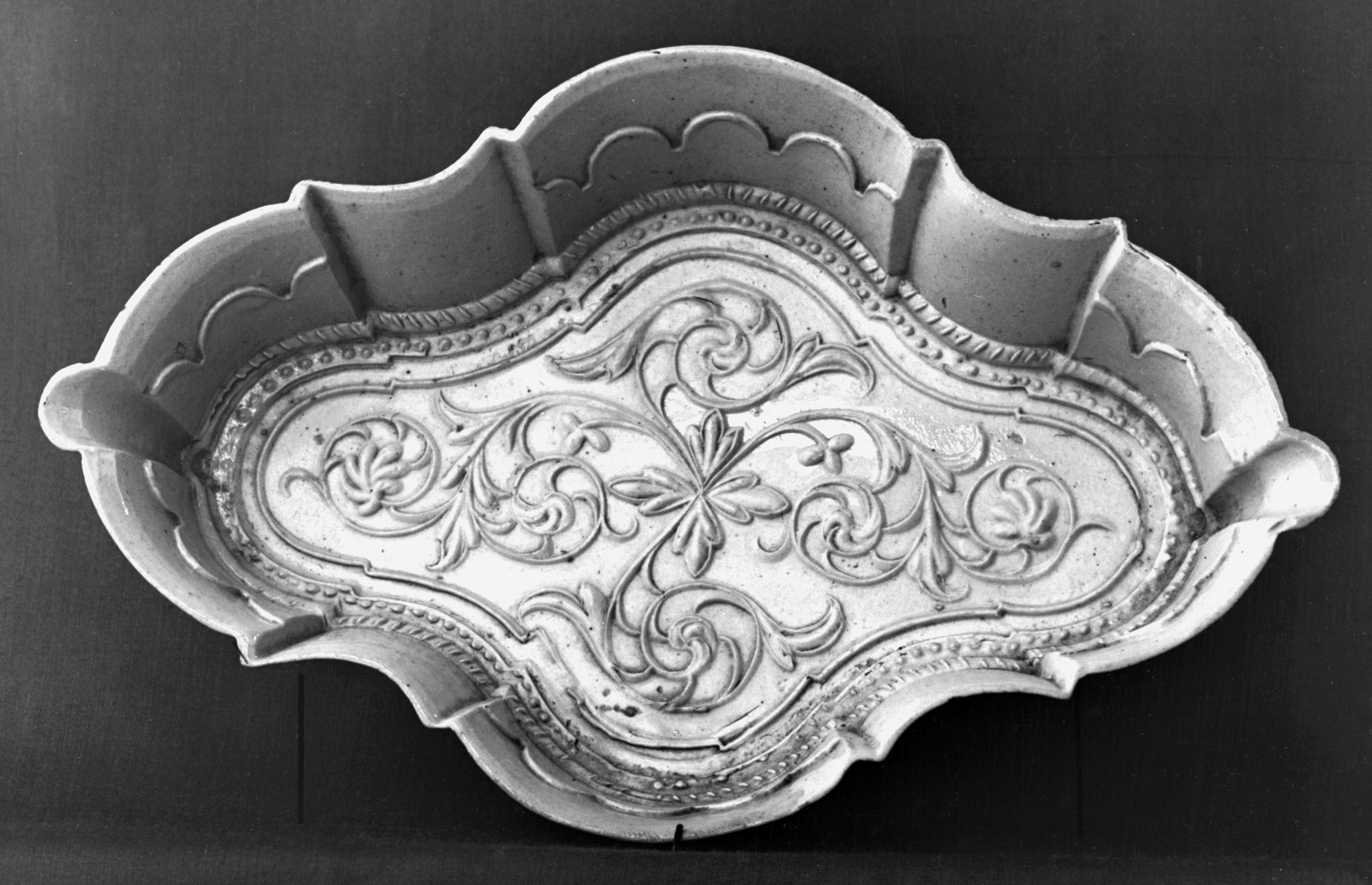
Silver spoon tray

A spoon tray is a tray used to rest the spoons that are either hot, wet, or prepared for serving. The spoon tray, usually elongated, can be found in the tea, dinner, or cabaret services. The spoon tray is sometimes called a spoon boat or a spooner (although some sources reserve the latter term for vessels used for the vertical arrangement of spoons).

The tray looks similar to the pickle or olive dish, but its edges are frequently flattened. Some spoon trays have slotted areas at their rims, to rest spoons more securely. The spoon boat was a typical part of a tea equipage in the first half of the 18th century, possibly due to the habit of drinking tea from the saucer that precluded using it to rest the spoon. Britain was importing novel porcelain "boats for spoons" from China in 1722 that were replacing local silver versions available since 1690s. The tea spoon boats went out of fashion by 1790s.
