= Ziferblat =

European cafe chain

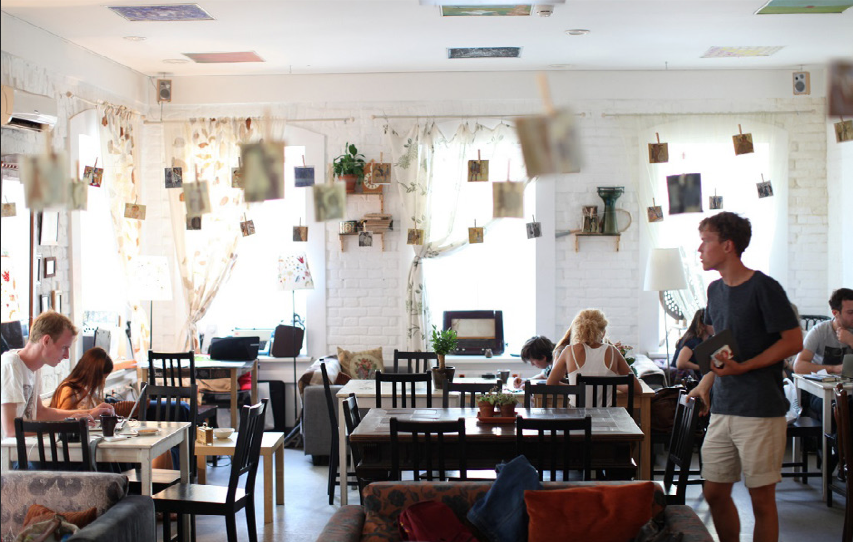
- Ziferblat in Moscow
- Industry: Restaurants
- Genre: Coffee house, Social space
- Founded: 2011
- Headquarters: Russia
- Key people: Ivan Mitin
- Number of employees: ~170
- Website: ziferblat.net

Ziferblat is an "anti-café" chain where customers pay per minute for the time spent in the venue, with food and drink being otherwise free of charge. Decorated in the style of a living room, guests clock in and out at the desk upon entry and are encouraged to treat the space like home. Typically, the public space includes boardgames, newspapers, wi-fi, a mixture of soft and hard furnishings, a piano, a library and craft supplies.

== History ==
The name Ziferblat is derived from Zifferblatt, meaning "clock face" in Russian and German. The first branch of Ziferblat was founded in 2010 and opened in September 2011 in Moscow by Ivan Mitin. Ziferblat's prototype was a common space called Tree House.

== Locations ==
Ziferblat operated in four countries but currently only operates in Russia.

=== Russia ===
In Russia, Ziferblat has had branches in Moscow, Saint Petersburg, Kazan, Nizhny Novgorod, and Rostov-on-Don. As of 2025, the Moscow, St Petersburg, and Rostov-on-Don branches appear to be still operating.

=== United Kingdom ===
In the United Kingdom, Ziferblat had branches in Manchester, Coventry and London.

The Liverpool branch in Albert Dock was closed in March 2017 after the Dock management evicted them over "considerable arrears". A second Liverpool branch was also closed in October 2018 following an allegation of rent arrears. The chain's MediaCityUK branch was closed in January 2019. The London branch closed in March 2021 citing the impact of the COVID-19 pandemic, and the Coventry branch closed in 2022.

=== Ukraine ===
In Ukraine, there was a Ziferblat branch in Kyiv.

=== Slovenia ===
Ziferblat had a branch in Ljubljana, Slovenia.

== Operation ==
Ziferblat is part of the sharing economy. During their first 2 years in the UK, Ziferblat was shortlisted for multiple awards and won the Innovation Award at the Cafe Life Awards and the Innovation100 in Greater Manchester.

The public sitting room space is intended to act as an alternative to working from home, and is hired on a flexible basis, paying by the minute, with an option to pay a monthly membership fee. Customers can also pay a fixed fee to stay for the whole day. In 2017, Ziferblat was cited as an example of how modern working patterns were changing in the United Kingdom, particularly in urban areas.

Each branch has a variety of creative spaces businesses can rent (with a minimum spend) for meetings or activities which would have been typically held in a hotel or a conference centre. Meeting room styles vary, and have included a primary school classroom and a chintzy vintage dining room. The pay per minute rate includes all technical equipment, Wi-Fi and unlimited snacks.

== See also ==
- Cafeteria
- Coffee service
