= Slop bowl =

European tea set component

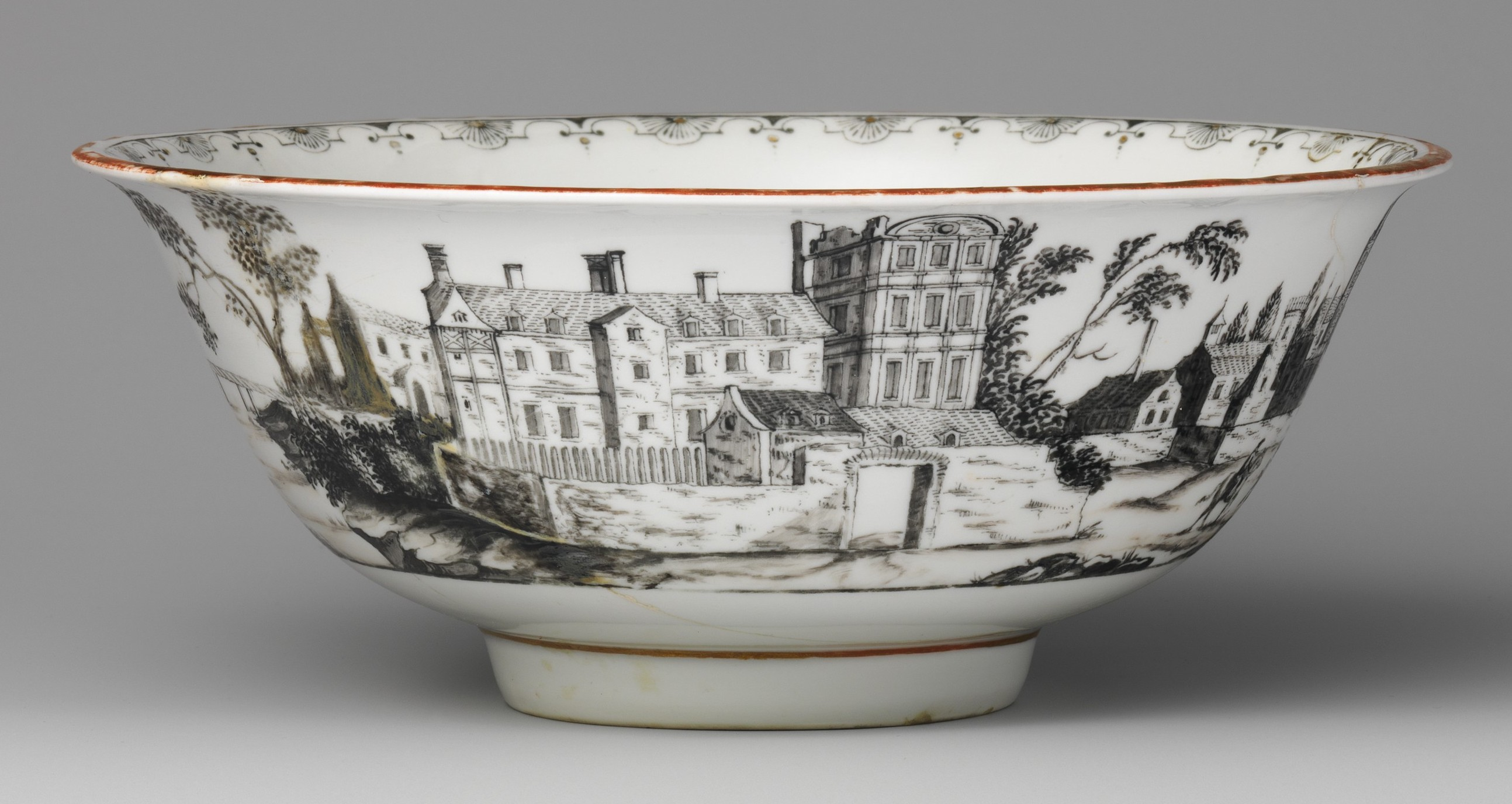
Vienna porcelain, c. 1735

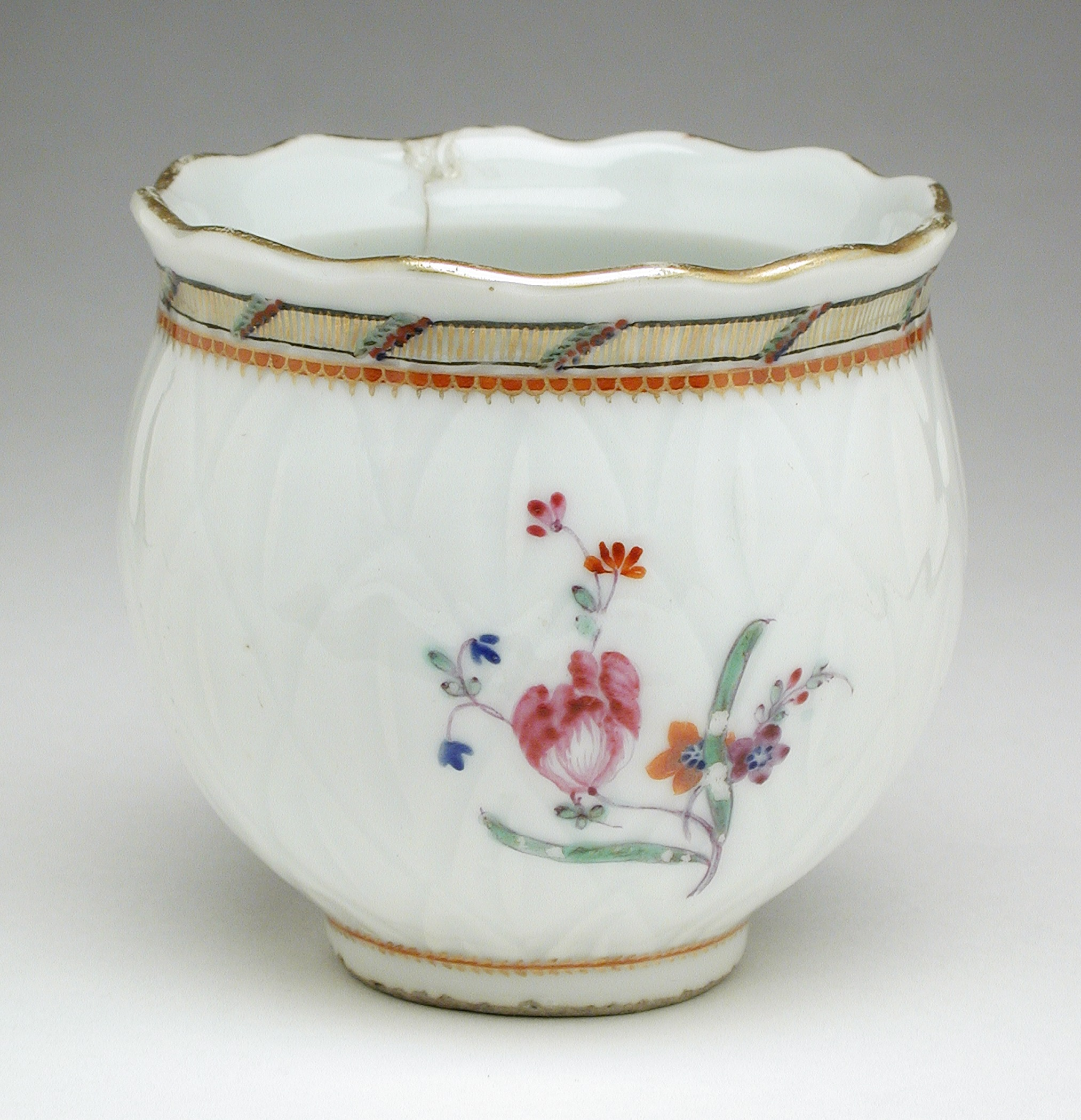
18th-century Chinese porcelain slop bowl

A slop bowl, slop basin or waste bowl is one of the components of a traditional tea set. It was used to empty the cold tea and dregs in tea cups before refilling with hot tea, as there were often tea leaves in the bottom of the cups.

As with the rest of the tea set, most slop bowls were in pottery, but some in silver. In the 18th century they typically held about half a pint, with some room to spare. Handleless ceramic bowls of this size and shape were also used for drinking tea at breakfast, sometimes known at the time as "breakfast basins", and it is not always possible to assign a particular role to a piece; indeed they may have been made as dual-purpose pieces. They became less common after about 1860, but services in the 1902 Sears Roebuck catalogue still offered them.

In 2015 a slop bowl from the famous Swan Service in Meissen porcelain (originally 1737 to 1742) fetched £18,125 at a London auction, compared to £31,250 for a teacup and saucer.

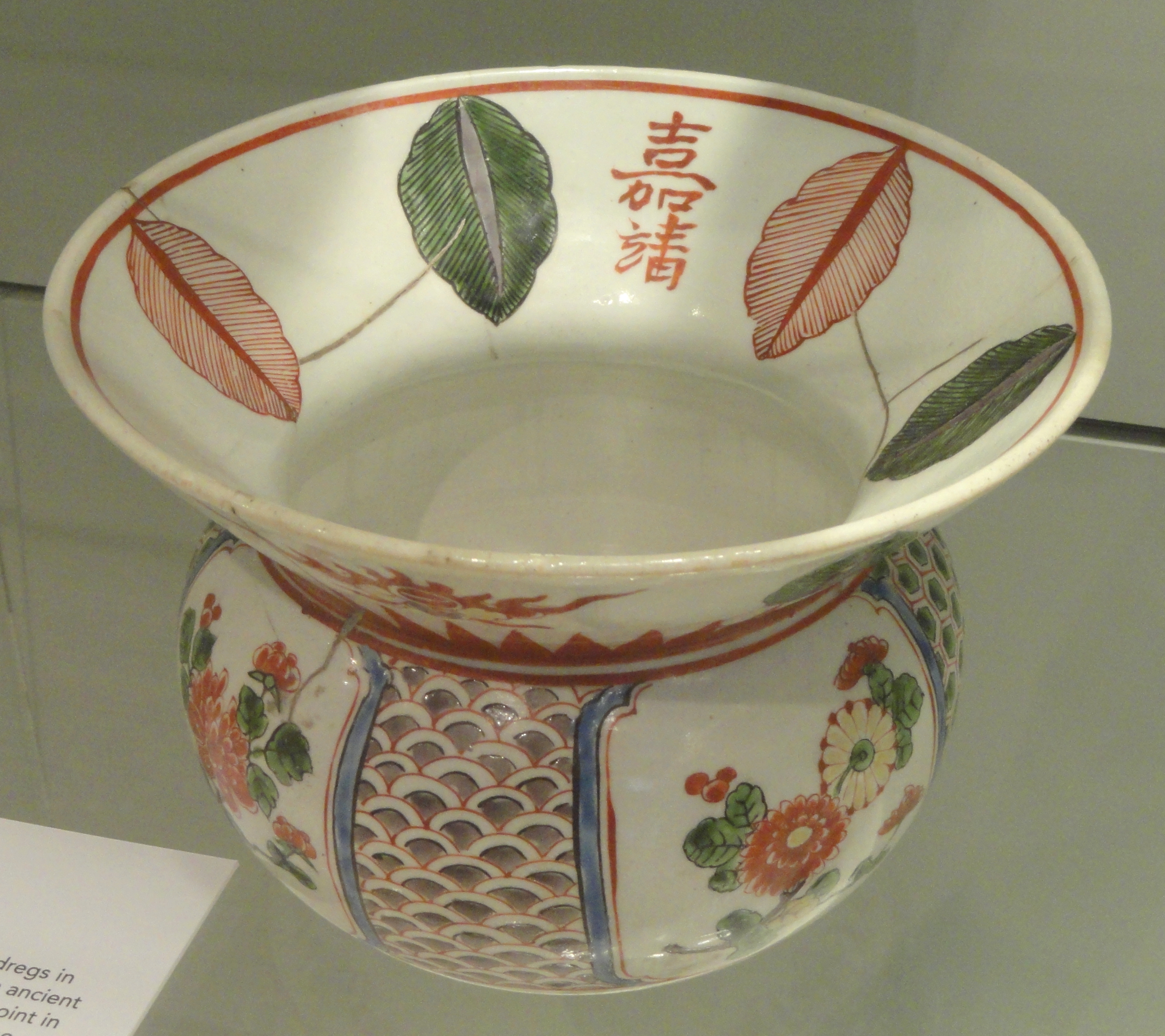
Arita ware bowl, 1650s, Japanese export porcelain

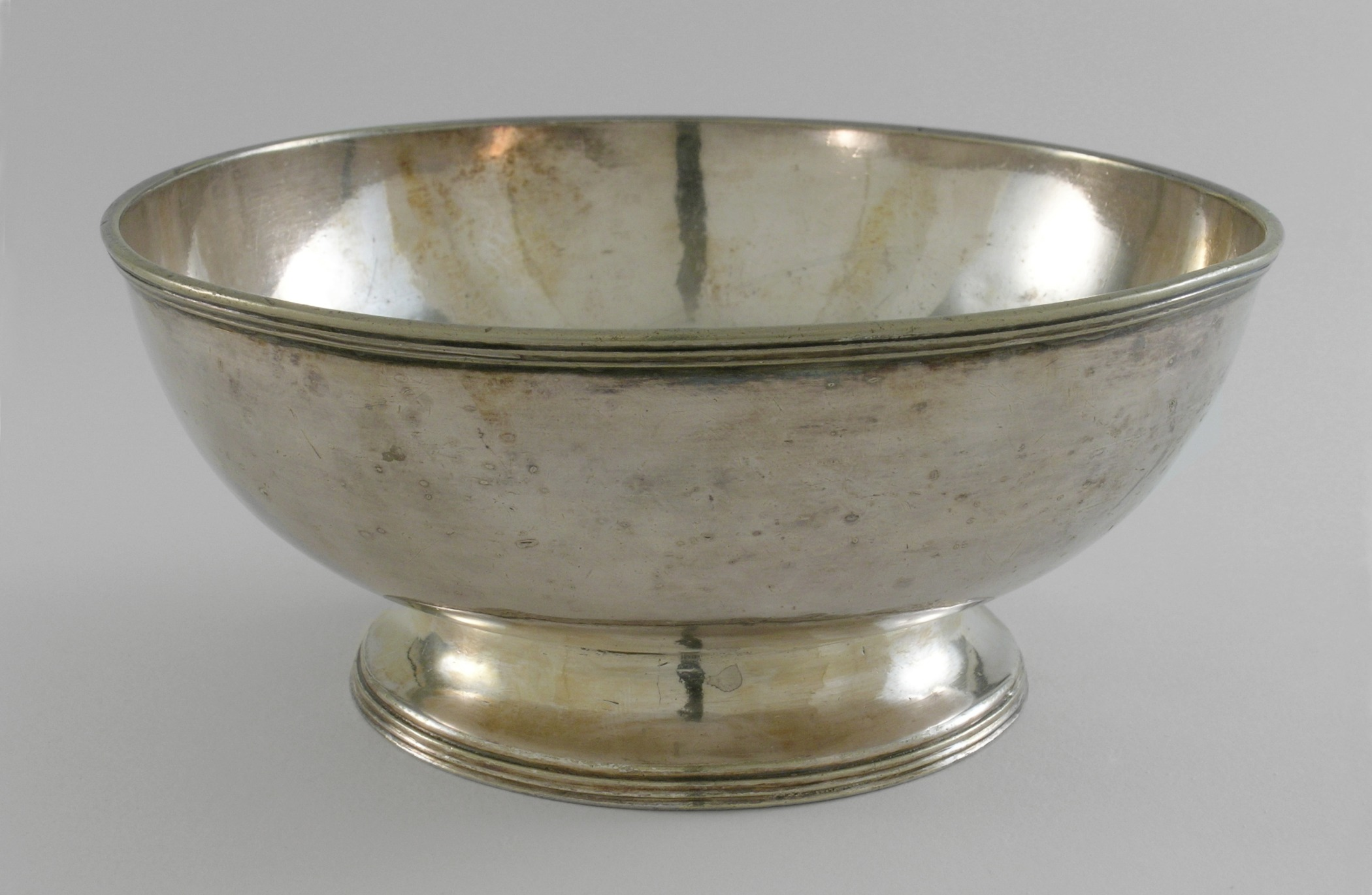
Silver, Philadelphia, c 1770

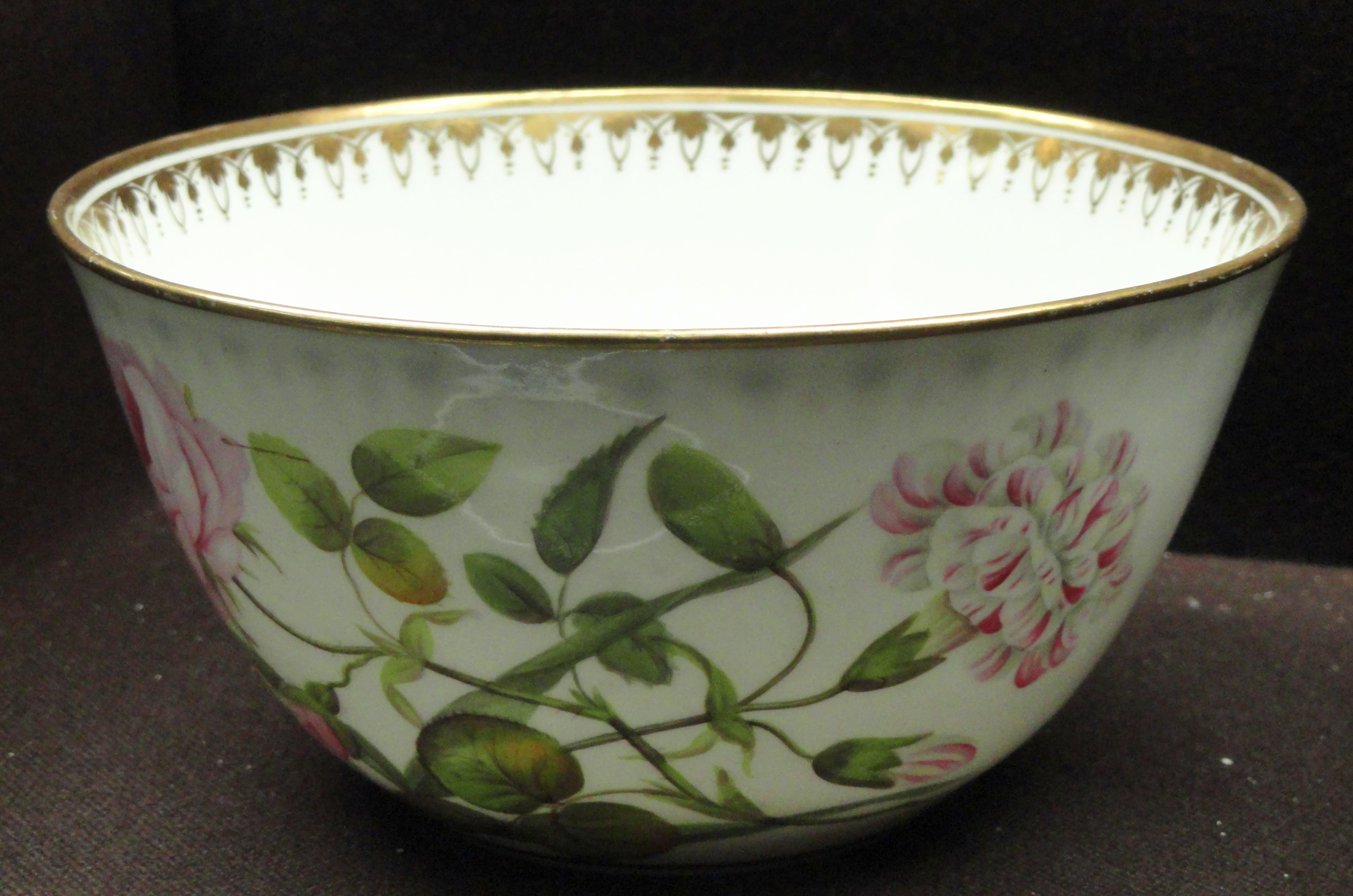
Mintons, English bone china, c. 1814
