= Sugar tongs =

Serving utensil

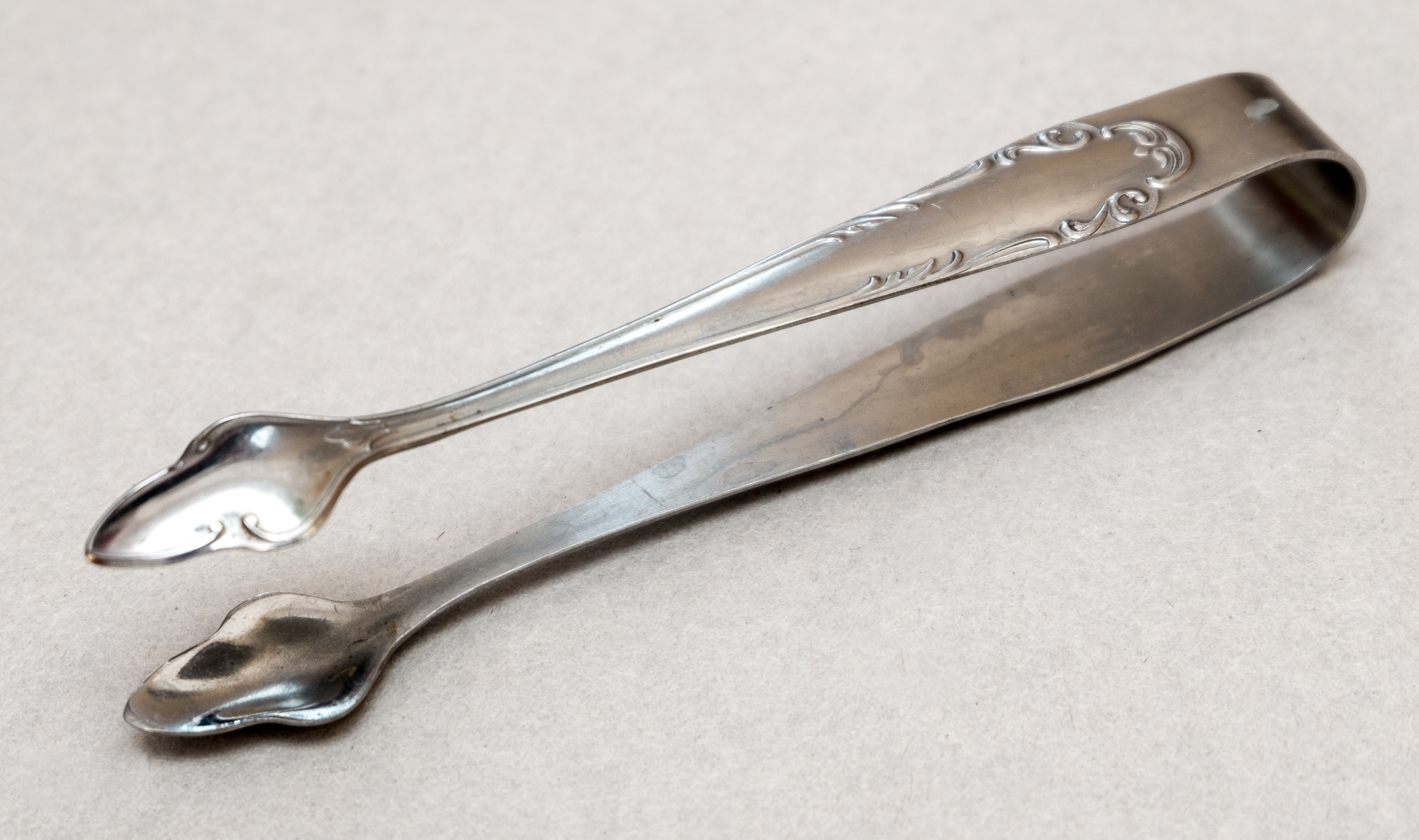
Sugar tongs

The sugar tongs are small serving utensils used at the table to transfer sugar pieces from the sugar bowl to the tea cups. The tongs appeared at the end of the 17th century, and were very popular by 1800, with half of the British households owning them. The decline of the formal tea party led to the disappearance of the sugar tongs, in the 21st century they are considered an oddity at the table in their original role, but had acquired a new meaning: the tongs now represent Englishness (somewhere along with Miss Marple). Also, these tongs still can be used to serve small candy, string beans, slices of cucumber, celery sticks.

== Terminology ==
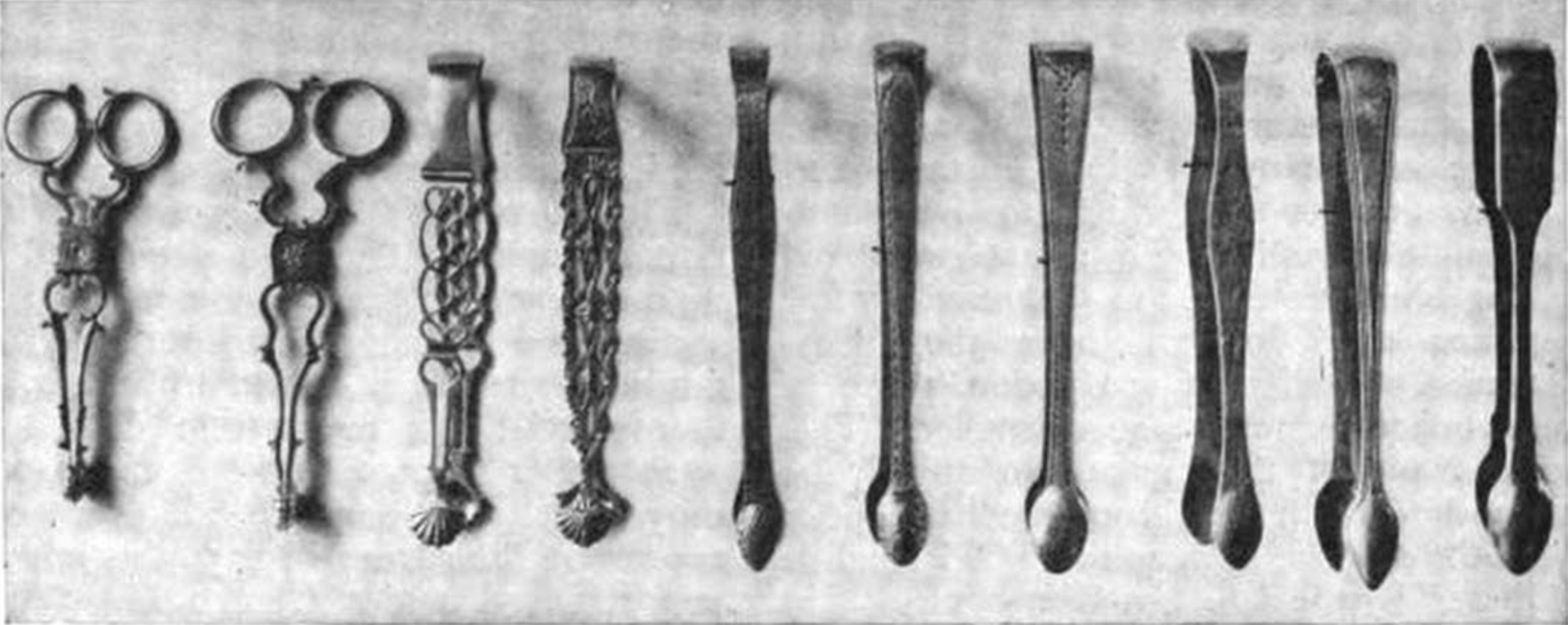
Evolution of sugar tongs: from nippers dating back to the reign of George I through highly decorative bows (1750s) to more modern tongs

Terminology is inconsistent. Egan Mew follows the evolution of the utensil through:

- sugar nippers. While these tools shared the name with sturdy sugar nips (and were also scissor-like), they were very different in nature: the latter were used to cut pieces off the sugarloaf in the kitchen, while the former were used at the table, were decorative and frequently made of silver; David Shlosberg asserts that this term was not contemporaneously applied to this utensil and the term "tea tongs" was actually used instead in the 18th century.
- sugar bows with highly decorative handles appear in 1750s (Shlosberg says the displacement started in the early 1770s) for a short time;
- sugar tongs with more plain designs appeared in the 18th century and gradually evolved into "bold, bad design" of the 19th century. By the early 20th century, the "fashion ... has dismissed the sugar-tongs from society".

== Construction ==
The early tongs were scissor-like, occasionally in fancy shapes like storks with long beaks or puppets grabbing the sugar with their hands. The majority at the time were "sugar bows" with two elaborately decorated hands with openwork that were joined by a flexible arc hammered into a spring, so that the hands opened when no pressure was applied to the arms. The latter part of the reign of George II and early reign of George III exhibited a very large variety of patterns pierced and chased onto the tongs. In the late Georgian era piercing popularity had declined, and the tongs were made to match the contemporary spoon designs (for example, with the fiddle pattern).

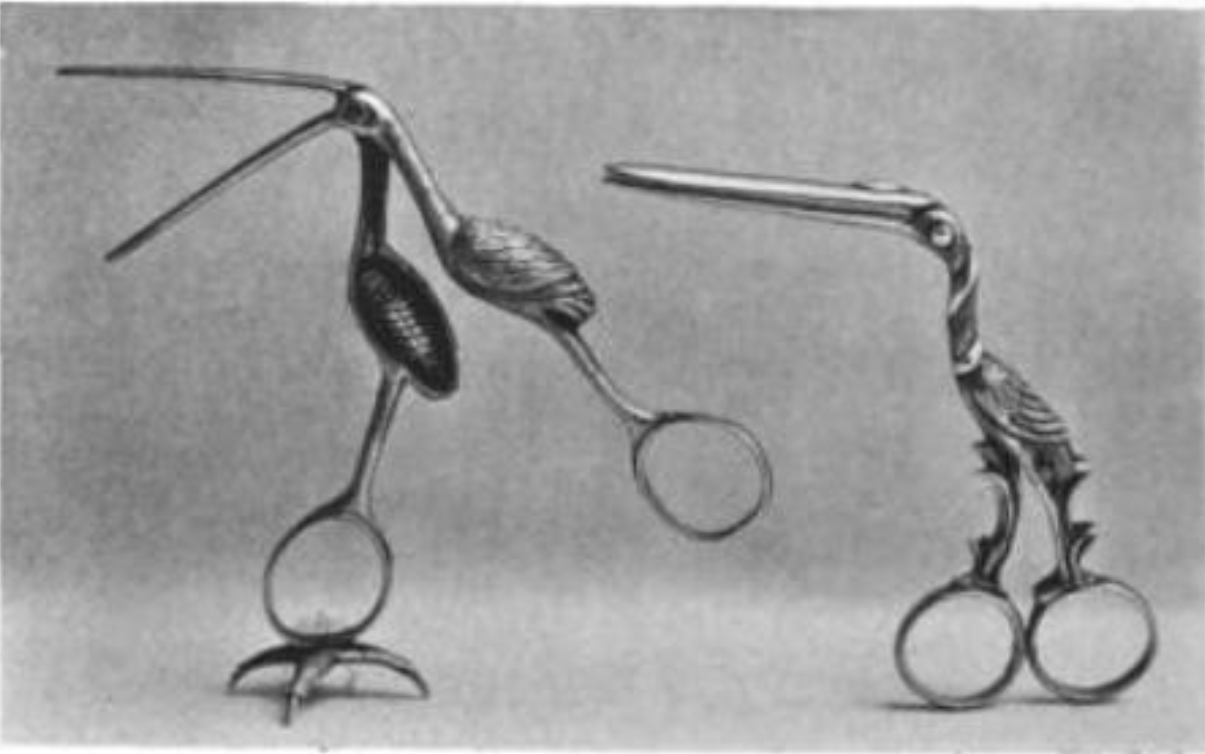
Stork-shaped sugar tongs (Great Britain, 18th century). When opened, the bodies of the birds reveal a baby inside, illustrating the legend of the stork delivering babies

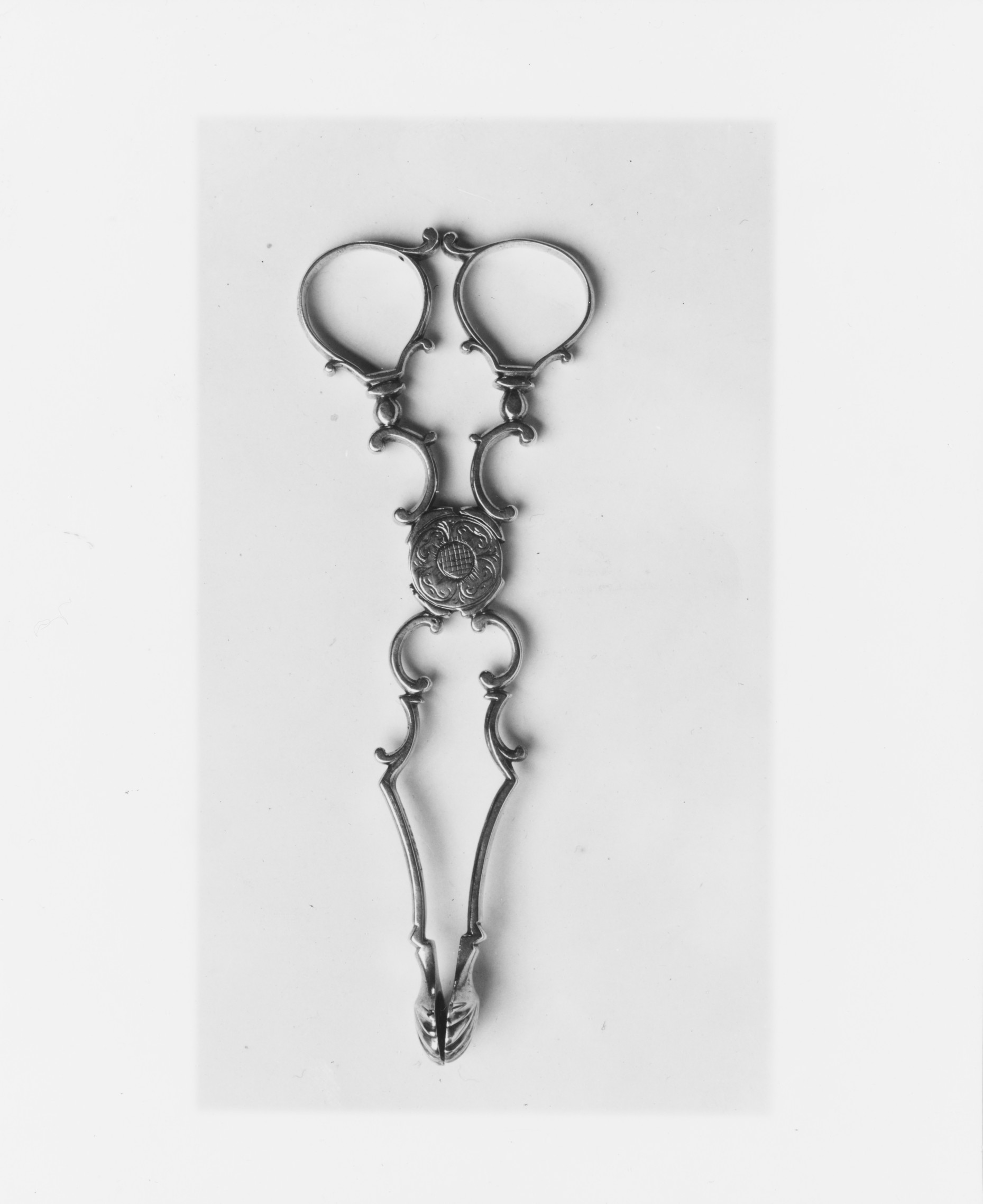
Scissor-shaped "nippers"

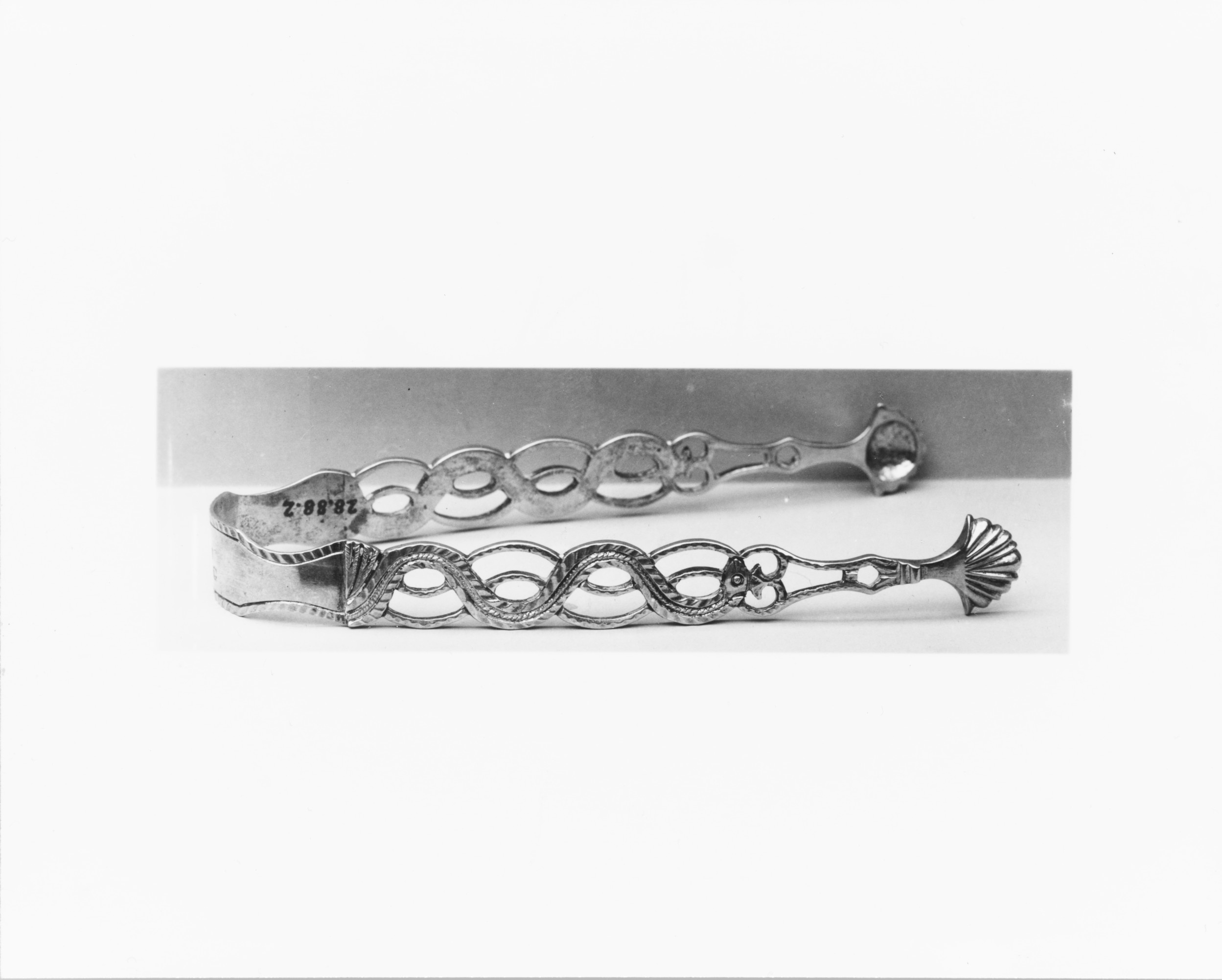
Sugar bows

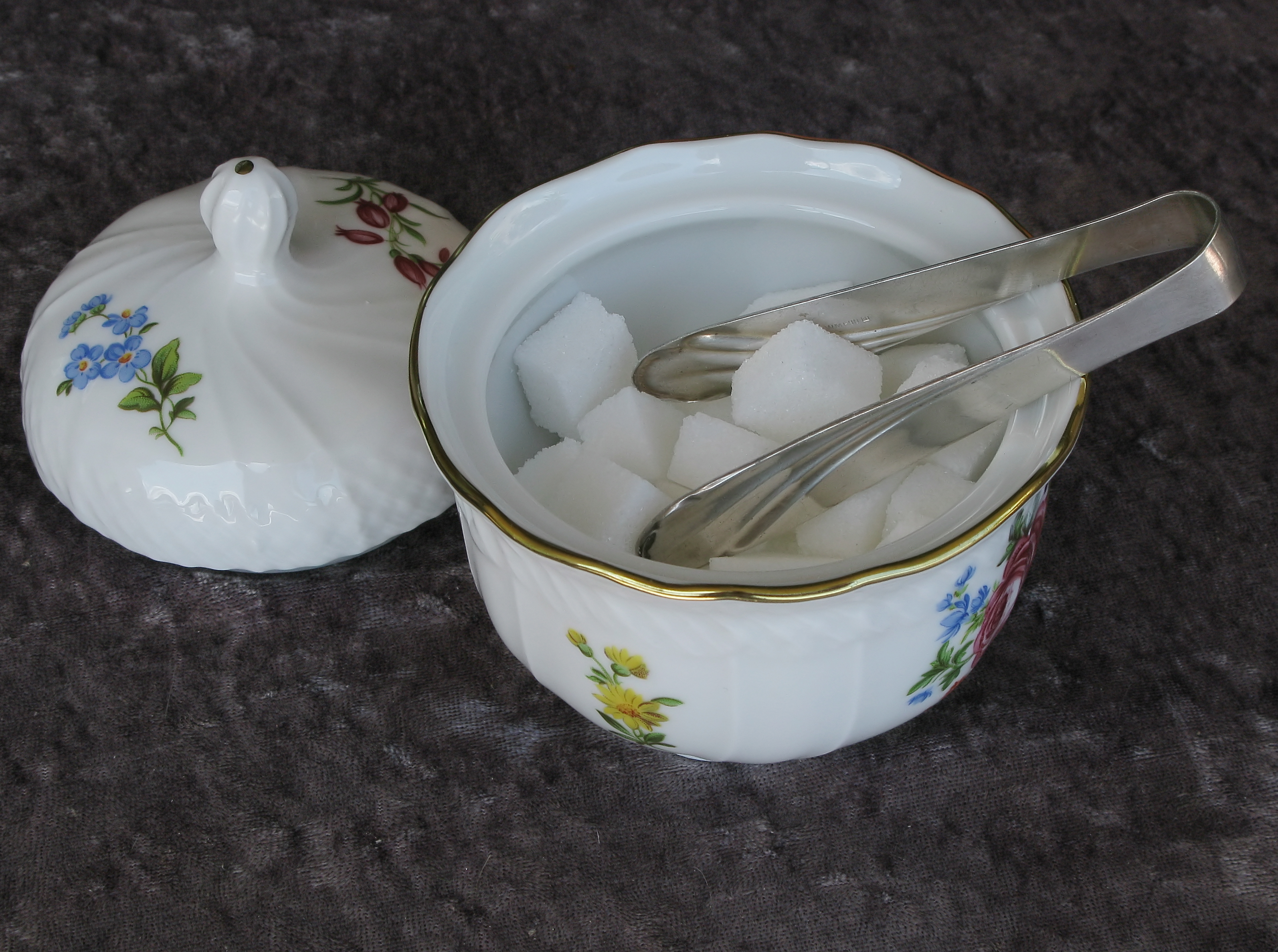
Sugar tongs in a sugar bowl

Sugar tongs with spring-loaded gripping claws, early 20th century.

== Sources ==
- Peavitt, Helen (2006). "Why Irons Are Useful and Sugar Nippers Are Not". ICON. 12. International Committee for the History of Technology: 30–37. JSTOR 23787052.
- Mew, Egan (1907). "The Collection of Antiques". The Pall Mall Magazine. 39. George Routledge & Sons, Limited: 496–500.
- Jackson, Charles James (1911). "Sugar-Tongs". An Illustrated History of English Plate, Ecclesiastical and Secular: In which the Development of Form and Decoration in the Silver and Gold Work of the British Isles, from the Earliest Known Examples to the Latest of the Georgian Period, is Delineated and Described. Vol. 2. Country Life.
- Havard, H. (1890). "Pince". Dictionnaire de l'ameublement et de la décoration depuis le XIIIe siècle jusqu'à nos jours (in French). Vol. 4. Maison Quantin.
- Von Drachenfels, Susanne (2000). "Small Serving Utensils". The Art of the Table: A Complete Guide to Table Setting, Table Manners, and Tableware. Simon & Schuster. p. 242. ISBN 978-0-684-84732-0.
- Shlosberg, David (2004). Eighteenth Century Silver Tea Tongs: An Illustrated Guide for Collectors. Shlosberg.
