= John Schuppe =

Dutch silversmith

John Schuppe (fl. 1753–73) was a Dutch silversmith working in London and noted for his humorous cow creamers (cream jugs).

John Schuppe is first recorded in England on 28 June 1753 when his name was recorded as a largeworker of Little Deans Court, St Martins-le-Grand. He was registered to 6 New Rents in 1755. In 1773 his name appeared in the Parliamentary Return. The majority of creamers shaped as a cow in the Dutch style between 1753 and 1773 bear his mark. Nothing is known of him after 1773.

One of his cow-shaped creamers (1759–60) is in the collection of the Victoria & Albert Museum, London, with the tail as the handle and a lid on the back with a giant fly on top. A similar jug by Schuppe sold at Bonhams in 2016 for £4,750 including premium.

The theft of a cow-shaped creamer was an element in the comic novel The Code of the Woosters (1938) by P.G. Wodehouse.
