= Anti-café =

Co-working space

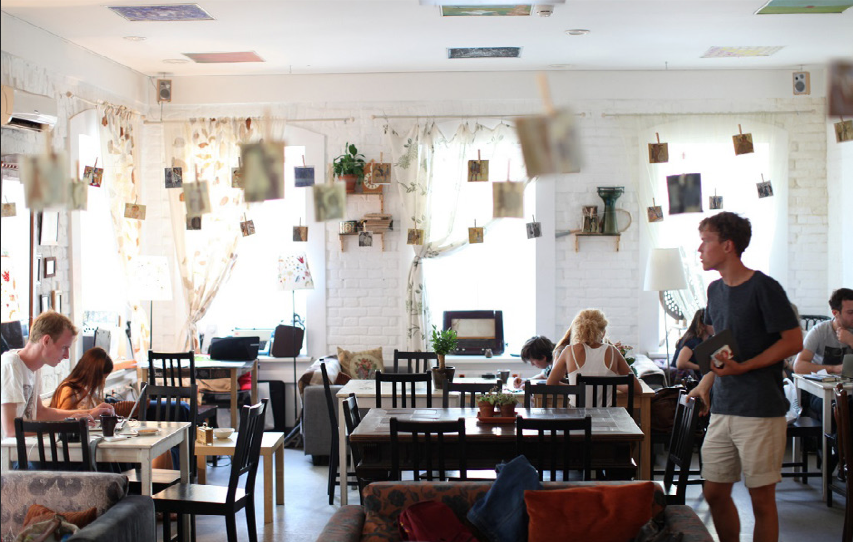
Ziferblat, an anti-café in Moscow

An anti-café (sometimes called a pay-per-minute café or a time club) is a venue that offers working space, food and drink, where customers pay only for the time they spend there. Anti-cafés became popular around 2011 in Russia and some CIS countries, with further independent anti-cafés opening across the world. Anti-cafés include the Ziferblat chain, founded by Russian writer Ivan Mitin in December 2010 in Moscow, the "Slow Time" café in Wiesbaden opened in 2013, and "Dialogues" in Bangalore.

Anti-cafés mostly target entrepreneurs, digital nomads, students, and creatives who need a cheap and convenient place to get their work done and meet other professionals. They can also be used by companies as a place to give presentations and press conferences at low cost.

== Operation ==
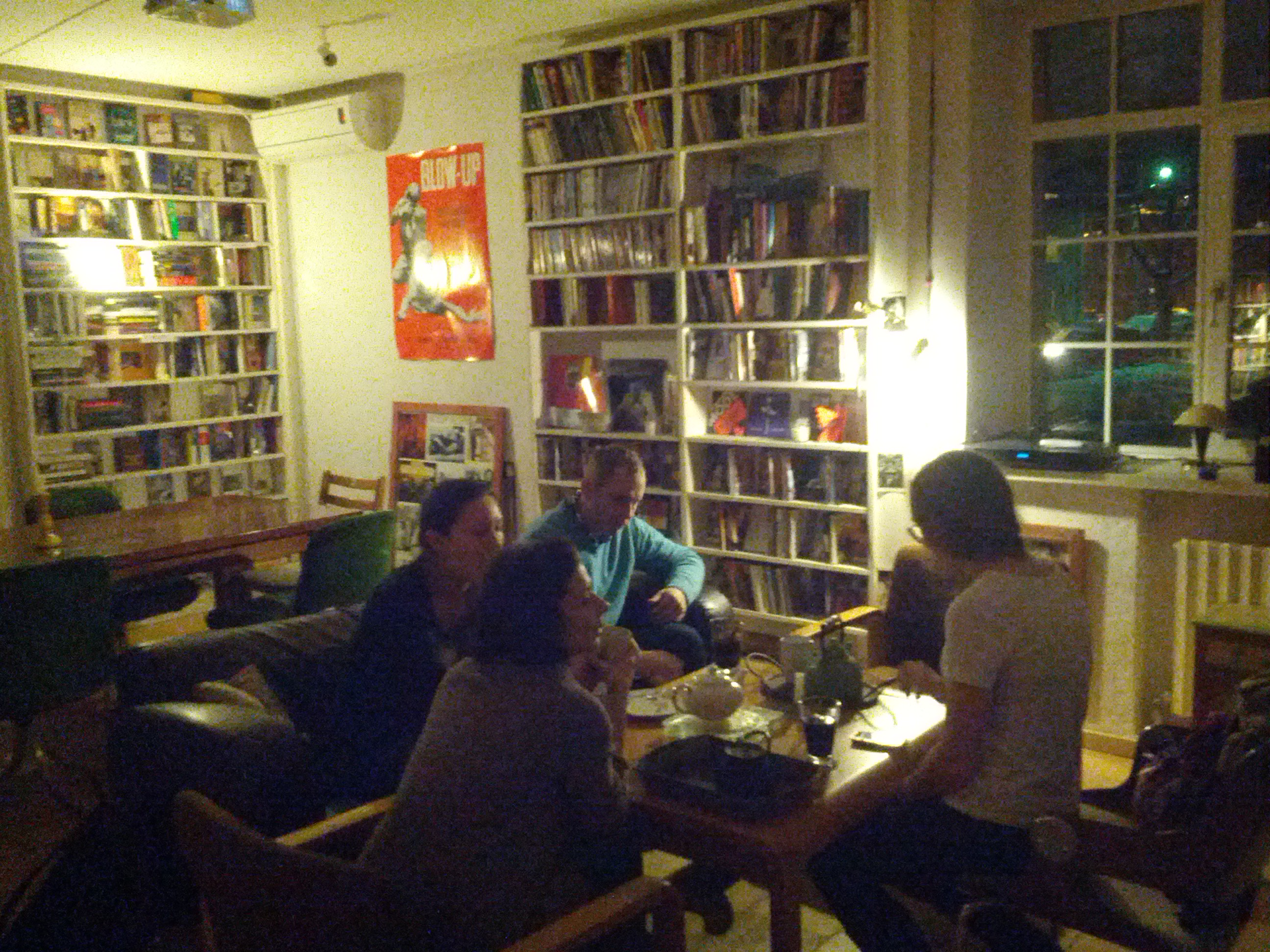
Kaliningrad Creative Library Laboratory in 2012

Customers at an anti-café do not pay directly for what they drink and eat, but for the time they spend there, typically charged by the minute. They may help themselves to coffee, tea, snacks, and sweets. As well as food and drink, anti-cafés may offer board games, libraries of books, coworking facilities, Wi-Fi, films, and video game consoles. Services vary according to spaces, with some offering lunch or brunch meals.

Although all anti-cafés charge for time, pricing strategies vary. L'Anticafé in Paris charges by the hour, but customers can also pay a cheaper whole-day rate. Others such as Be'kech in Berlin have the option to pay by the minute. An anti-café in Bordeaux uses a hybrid model of charging a fixed fee for the first hour and by the minute beyond that.

Anti-cafés usually consist of one large hall or several rooms, within which guests move freely, while in one of the rooms there is a treat area where visitors can make their own tea, coffee, and take sweets. Most establishments allow customers to bring their own food and drink, however, as a rule, alcohol and smoking are prohibited.

Anti-cafés usually have free Internet access via Wi-Fi, and a printer service can also be provided.

== See also ==
- Tea room
- Internet café
