= Creamer (vessel) =

Small jug designed for holding cream or milk

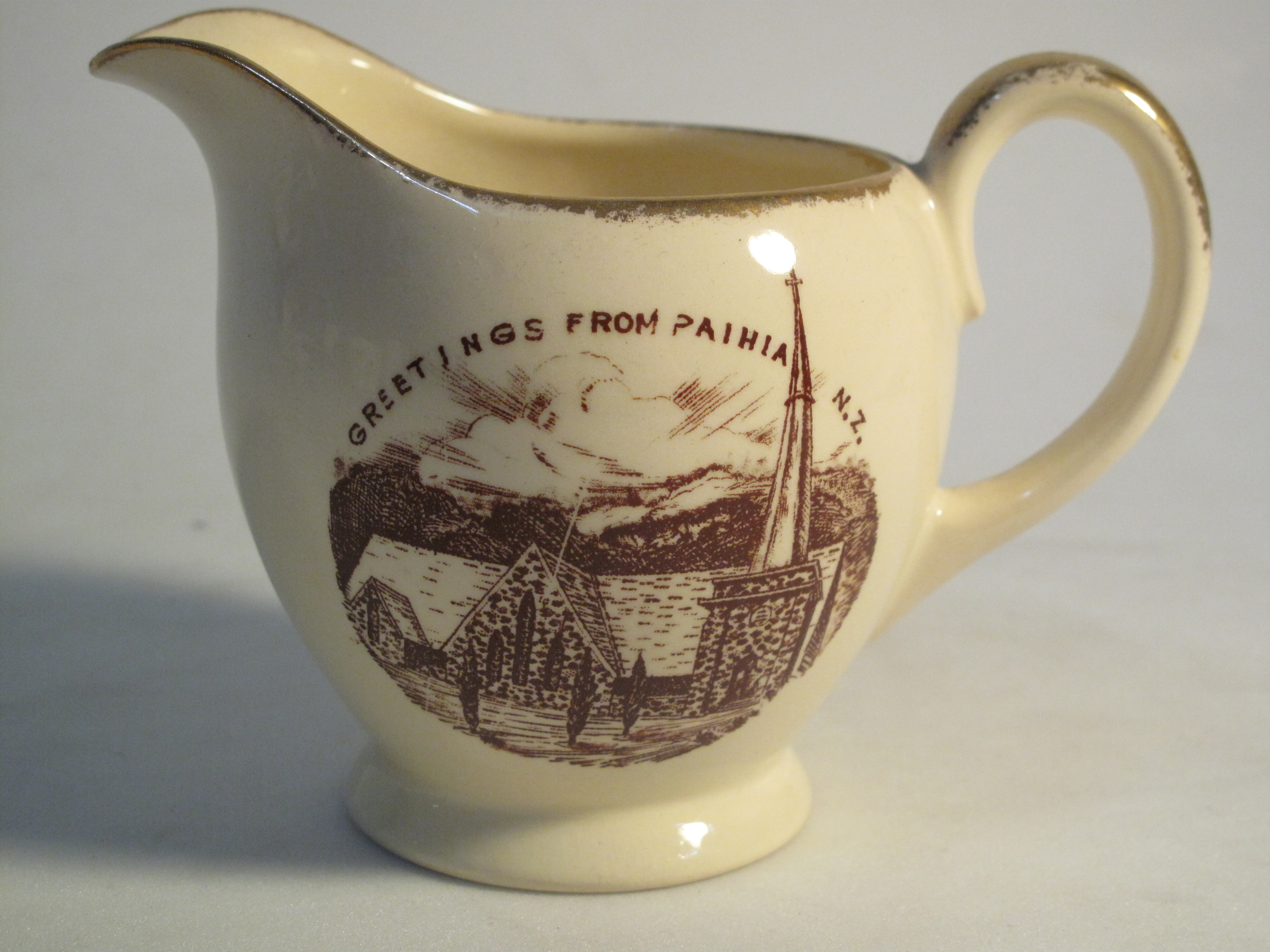
Creamer from New Zealand, 20th century

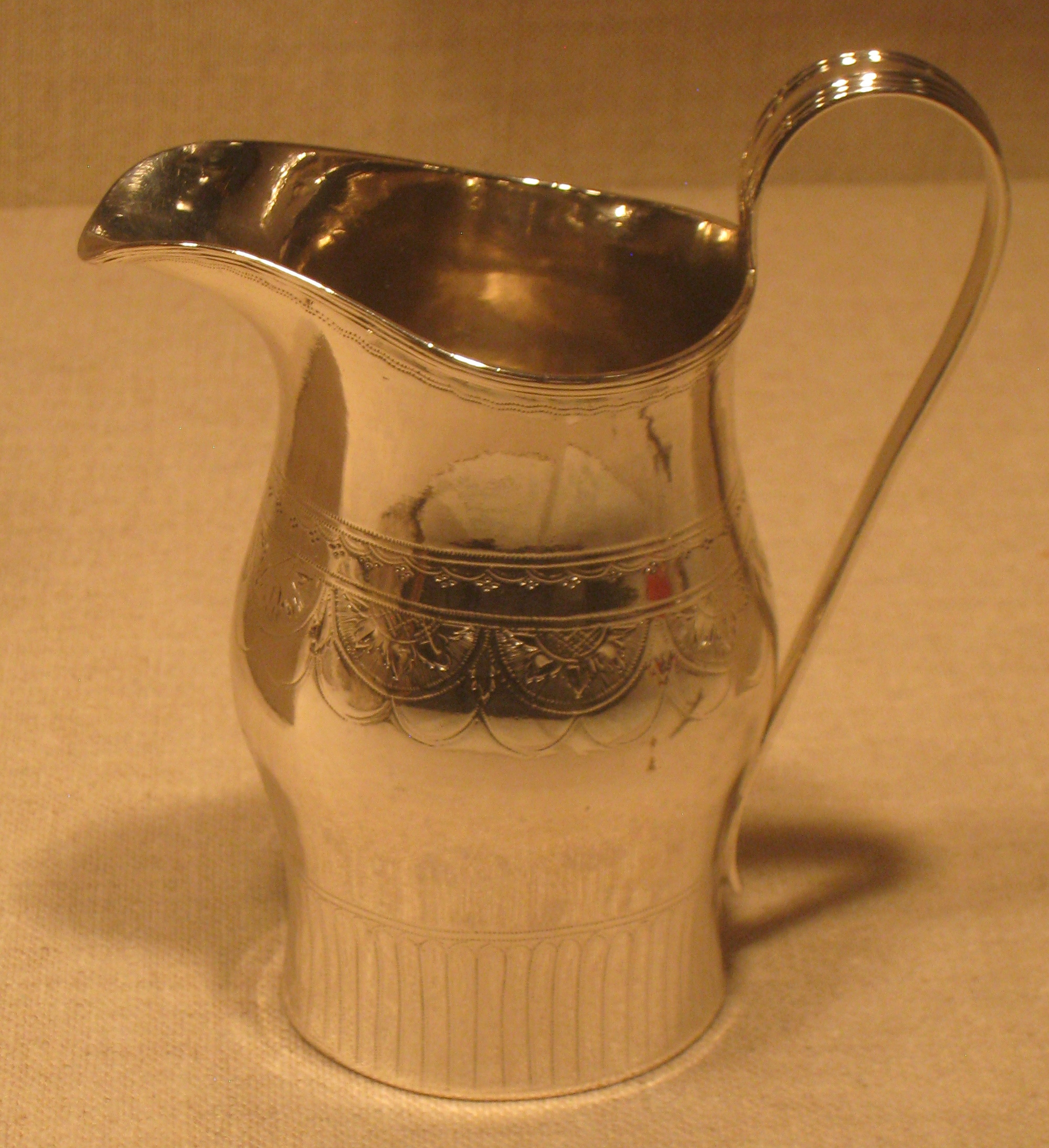
A decorated silver creampot, circa 1800, by Paul Revere, Worcester Art Museum

A creamer is a small pitcher or jug designed for holding cream or milk to be served with tea or coffee in the Western tradition. Creamers can be earthenware or porcelain, but also made of silver or other metals; a creamer is an obligatory part of a coffee or tea set, whether in silver or ceramics.

== Cow creamers ==
Creamers in the shape of a cow with an opening or lid on its back for filling, known as cow creamers, originated in Holland, but became very popular in England, first with Dutch imports, then from about 1740 in saltglaze stoneware from the Staffordshire Potteries. English silverware examples are from about 1750; the Dutch immigrant silversmith John Schuppe, who worked in London from 1753, produced little else, and his examples are among the finest. The competition between two collectors for an especially valuable silver cow creamer is a plot-line in P. G. Wodehouse's novel The Code of the Woosters. They have continued to be produced in both silver and ceramics. The Potteries Museum & Art Gallery has the Keiller collection of 667 ceramic cow-creamers.

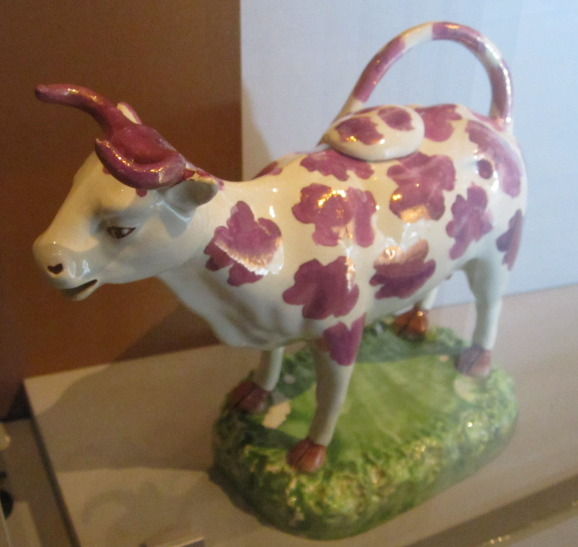
Ceramic cow creamer, 1820–40, "possibly Cambrian Pottery"

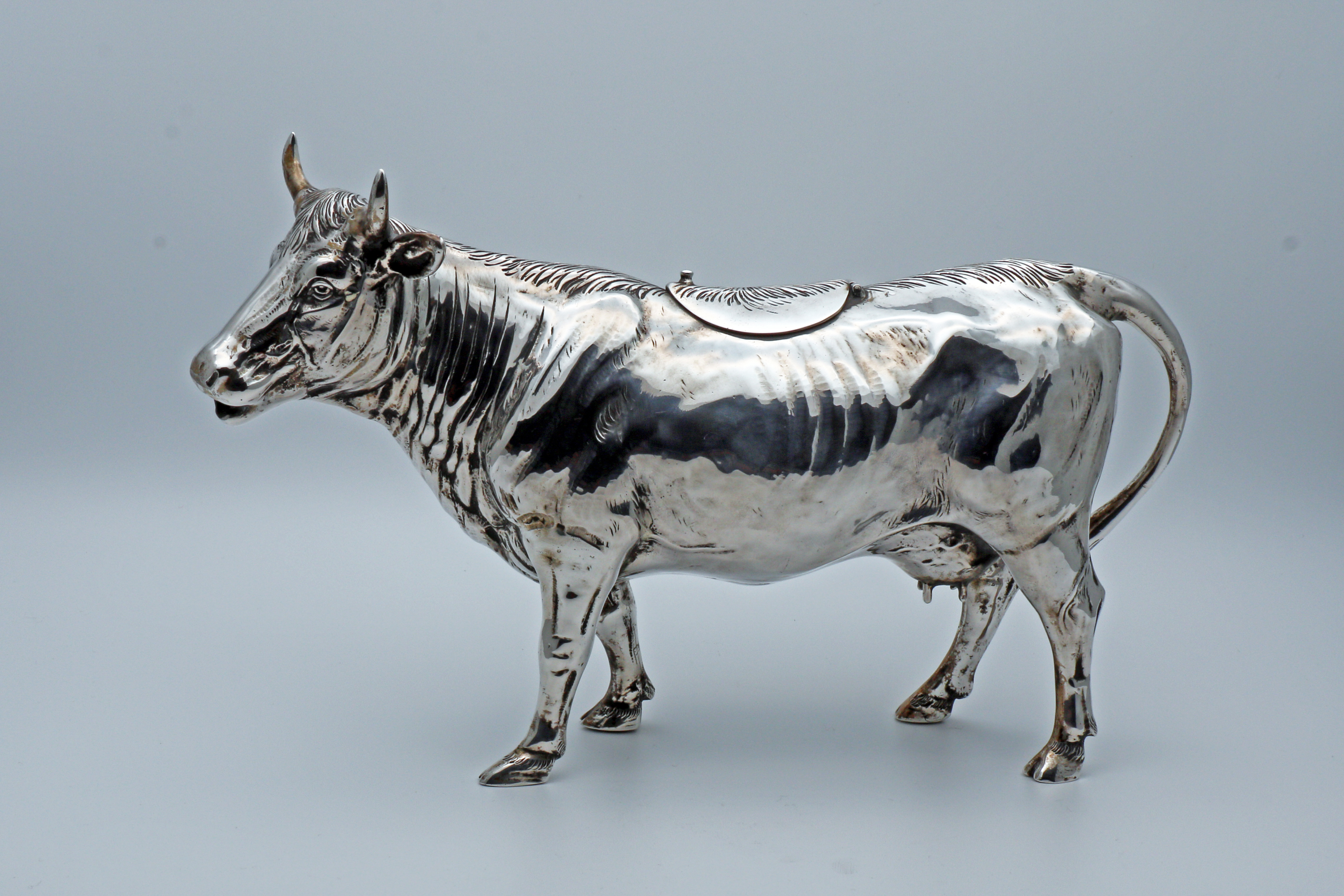
Silver cow creamer from Germany by Jean L. Schlinghoff

== Espresso brew pitcher ==
Small metal creamers may be used in making espresso-based drinks – the espresso being brewed into the pitcher, which is then poured into the drink. In this context they are referred to as espresso brew pitchers, and also billed as "small creamers". Brew pitchers are most commonly 89 millilitres (3 US fl oz), which is sufficient for any espresso other than a large (double or triple) lungo, but pitchers may also be found in 150 millilitres (5 US fl oz) and even 240 millilitres (8 US fl oz) sizes.

Espresso brew pitchers are particularly used for layered latte macchiatos, which require careful pouring. In other drinks, an espresso cup or shot glass is a common alternative, which must be dumped rather than poured.
