= Tea set =

Collection of teaware and utensils

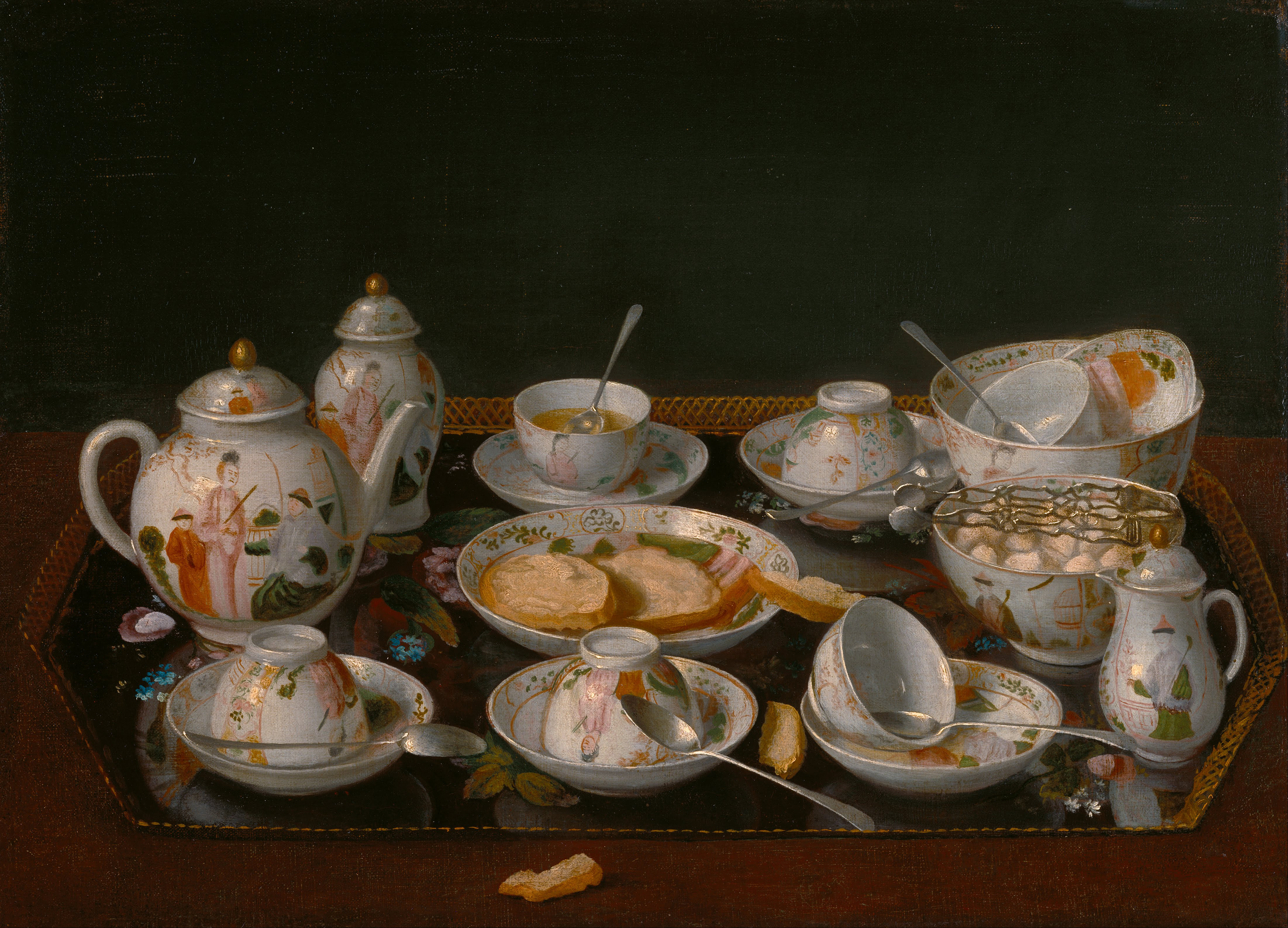
Still Life: Tea Set, c. 1781–1783, painting by Jean-Étienne Liotard. Tea caddy is in the back on the left, slop basin − on the right behind the sugar bowl.

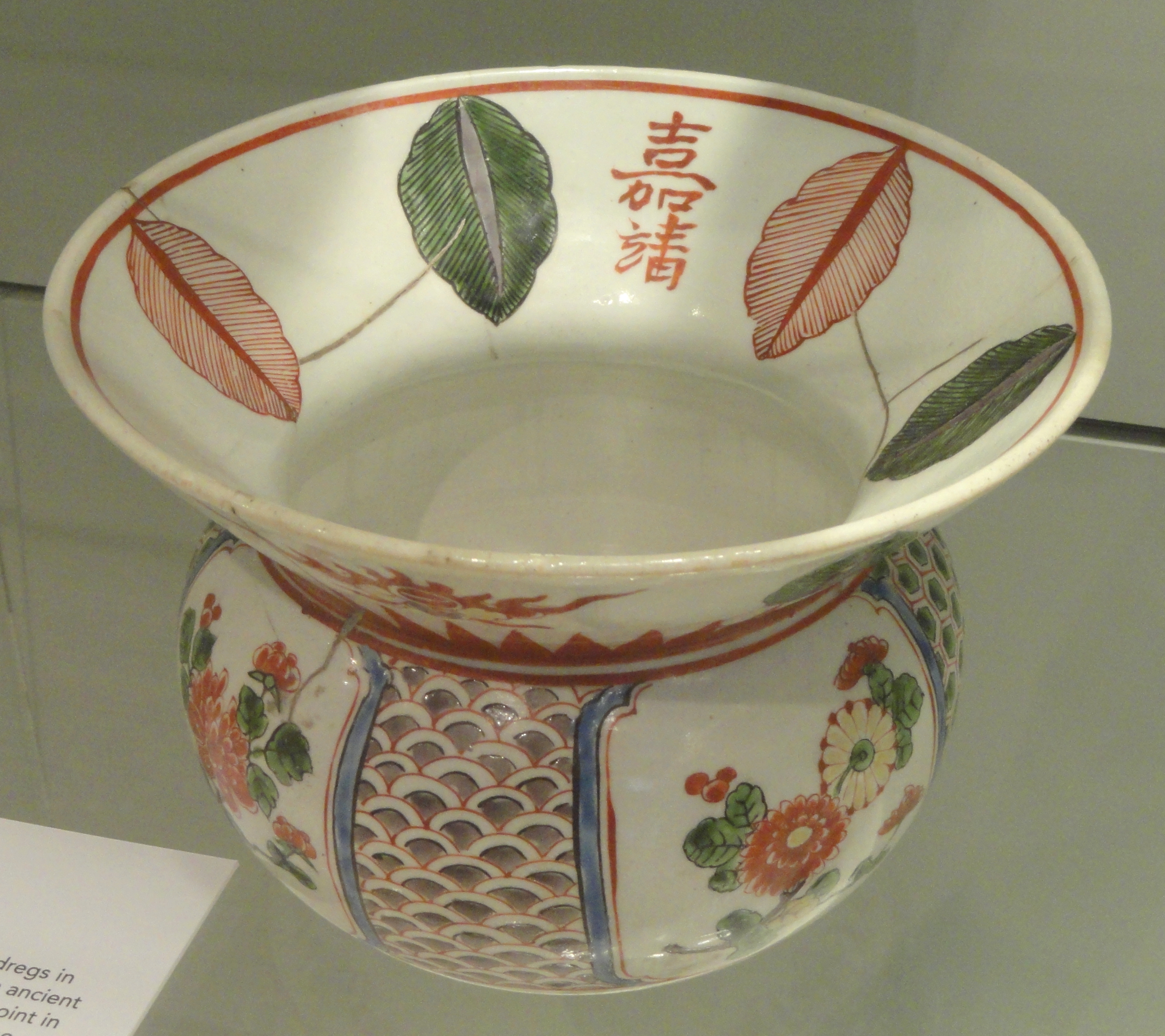
A Japanese slop basin; slop basins are a common item in tea sets which are used for tea which is no longer fresh and hot enough to drink

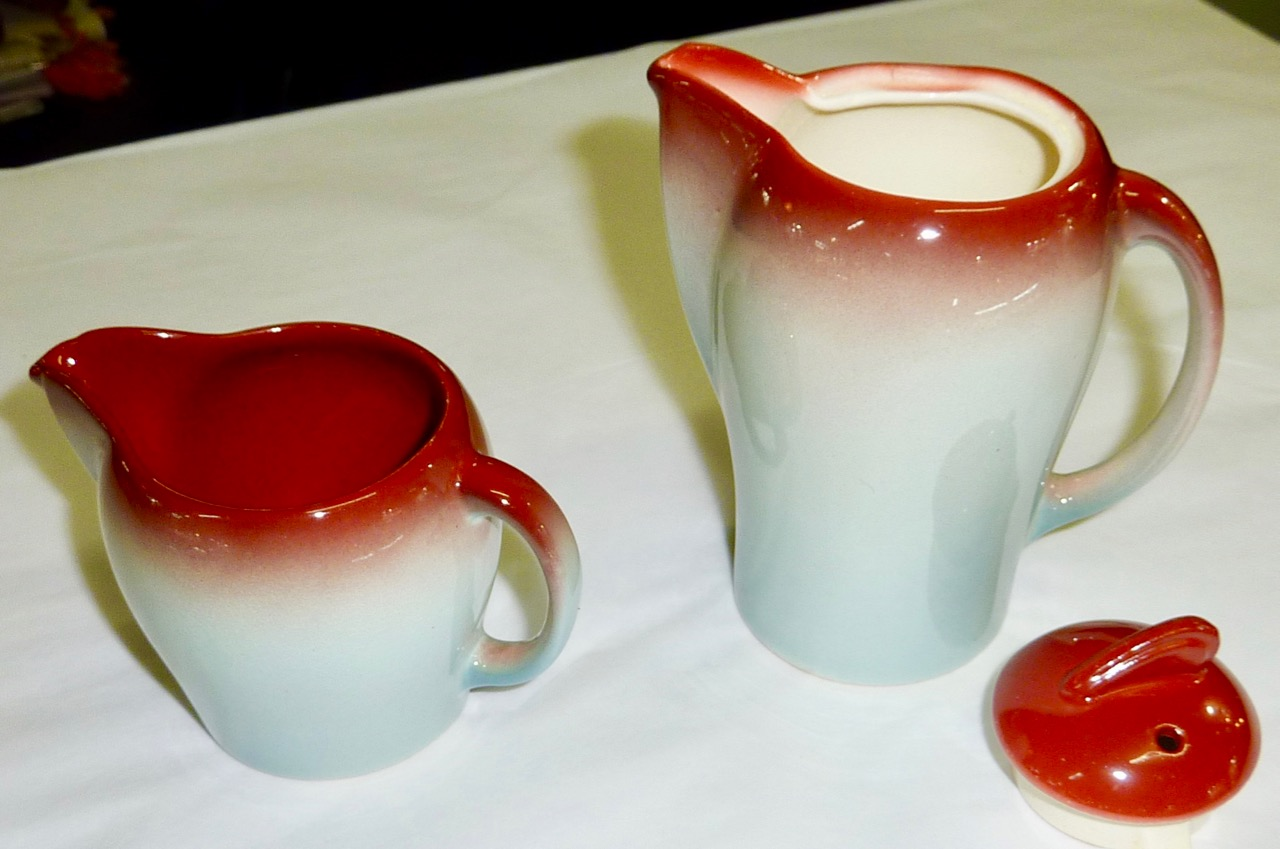
An English hot water jug and creamer; both items are commonly included in tea sets; the hot water is provided so that some of the tea can be made weaker

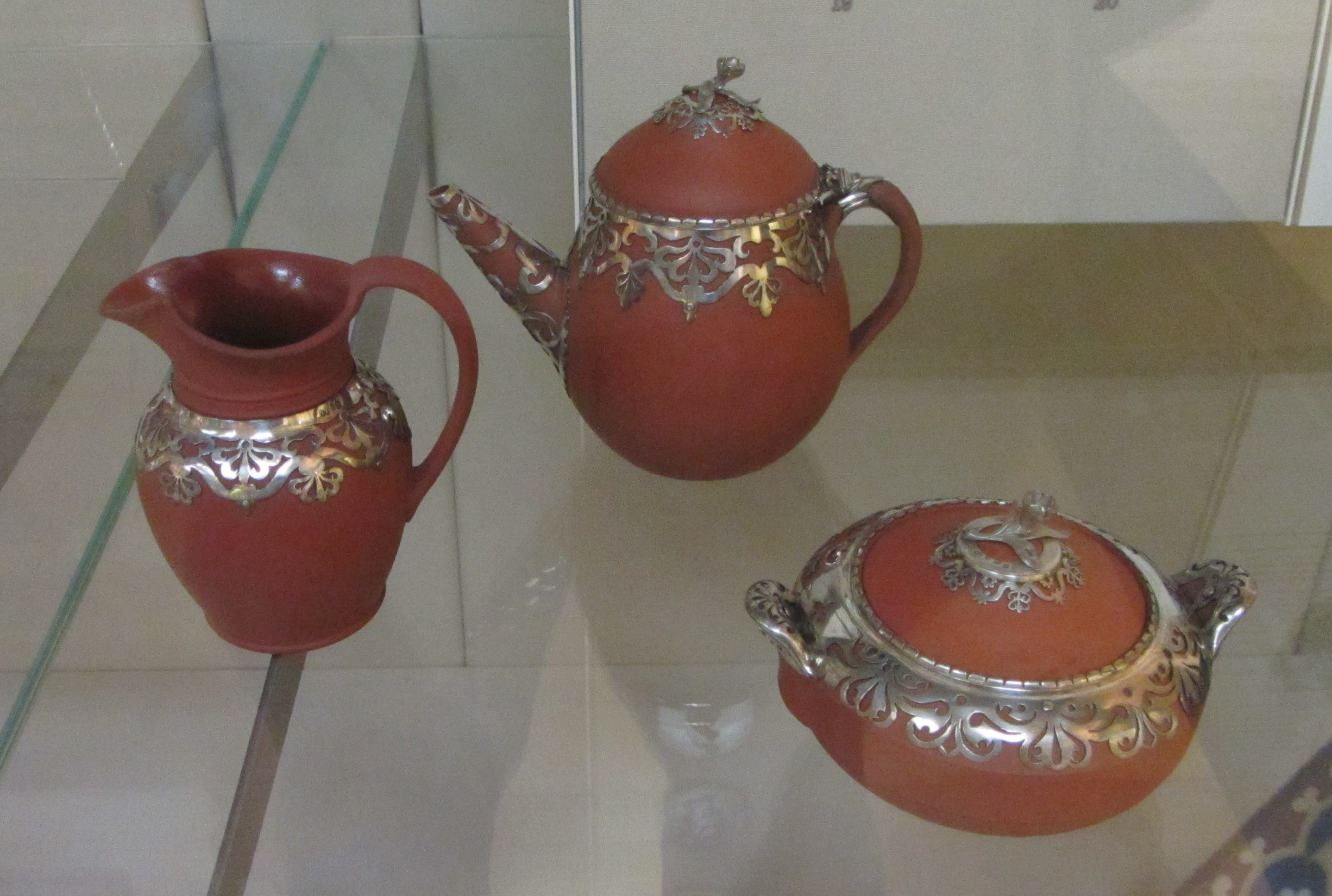
An early Victorian Wedgwood tea set

A tea set or tea service is a collection of matching teaware and related utensils used in the preparation and serving of tea. The traditional components of a tea set may vary between societies and cultures.

== History ==
=== China ===
The accepted history of the tea set begins in China during the Han dynasty (206–220 BC). At this time, tea ware was made of porcelain and consisted of two styles: a northern white porcelain and a southern light blue porcelain. These ancient tea sets were not the creamer/sugar bowl companions that are now commonly used, but were rather bowls that would hold spiced or plain tea leaves, which would then have water poured over them. The bowls were multi-purpose, and used for a variety of cooking needs. In this period, tea was mainly used as a medicinal elixir, not as a daily drink for pleasure's sake.

It is believed the teapot was developed during the Song dynasty (960–1279 AD). An archaeological dig turned up an ancient kiln that contained the remnants of a Yixing teapot. Yixing teapots, called Zi Sha Hu in China and Purple Sand teapots in the U.S., are perhaps the most famous teapots. They are named for a tiny city located in Jiangsu Province, where a specific compound of iron ore results in the unique coloration of these teapots. They were fired without a glaze and were used to steep specific types of oolong teas. Because of the porous nature of the clay, the teapot would gradually be tempered by using it for brewing one kind of tea. This seasoning was part of the reason to use Yixing teapots. In addition, artisans created fanciful pots incorporating animal shapes.

The Song dynasty also produced exquisite ceramic teapots and tea bowls in glowing glazes of brown, black and blue. A bamboo whisk was employed to beat the tea into a frothy confection highly prized by the Chinese.

=== Europe ===
As late as 1710, the teapots, stands for them, tea canisters, milk pots, sugar dishes, bowls, cups, and saucers were mostly not imported into Britain as already matched "sets", assembly of the sets was done by the traders. However, at this time it became possible to order porcelain products from China that would accommodate a custom graphic design (for example, a coat of arms or trade sign). Large orders for teasets started to appear in 1770s, frequently named "breakfast sets", that included:

- a large or small teapot;
- a sugar bowl with a cover and a plate to put it on;
- a creamer or milk jug;
- teacups and saucers (twelve of each). Tea cups at the time did not have handles.

Larger sets also included:

- a second teapot;
- a slop basin and a plate for it;
- a stand for the milk jug;
- a tea canister;
- twelve coffee cups (these already had handles).

The Sèvres porcelain factory, after its establishment in 1738, concentrated on producing teapots, but the focus had switched to tea sets after the manufacturing was moved to the new building in 1756. Mass production of European tea sets started in 1790s, but they were still expensive and remained a privilege of the wealthy; the less well-to-do families occasionally cobbled together whatever tea pieces they had in order to hold a collective tea party. The sets became more affordable by the second half of the 19th century. The poor families might still use teaware "of the period when the handles were unknown", but the desire to own a full tea set became universal.

Side plates were added to the service in the mid-19th century to serve sandwiches and pastries for the afternoon tea.

== Chinese Yixing tea set ==
This is a Chinese Yixing tea set used to serve guest which contains the following items.

- A Yixing teapot
- A tray to trap the wasted tea/water.
- Cups to drink the tea.
- A tea tool kit which contains the following: digger, funnel, needle, shuffle, tongs and vase.
- A brush to wipe the wasted tea all over the tray to create an even tea stain.
- A sieve - even if tea is poured from the pot, some tea leaf bits will still be poured out, hence a sieve will help filter out the loose bits during pouring.
- A clay animal or two. They are used for display and luck by many Chinese drinkers.

== Formal tea ==
A tea service for a formal tea party includes, in addition to tea cups and teaspoons, the following accoutrements:

- a teapot;
- hot-water kettle with a spirit lamp;
- a sugar bowl for sugar cubes with sugar tongs;
- a creamer;
- a tea caddy with a caddy spoon;
- a tea strainer;
- a slop bowl;
- a lemon plate with a lemon fork.

== Gallery ==
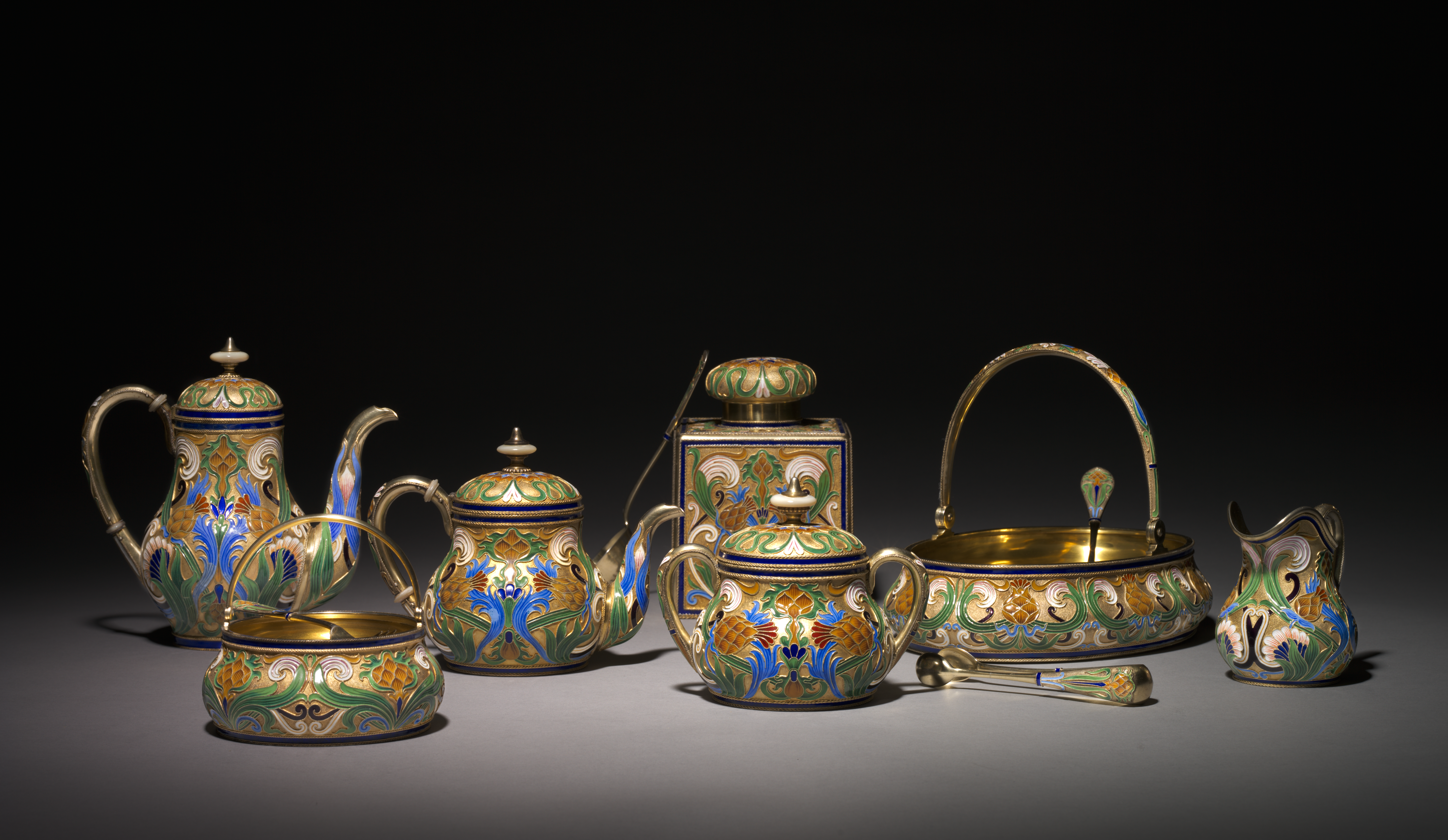
Russian tea set; by Peter Carl Fabergé; made before 1896; silver gilt and opaque cloisonne enamel; Cleveland Museum of Art (USA)

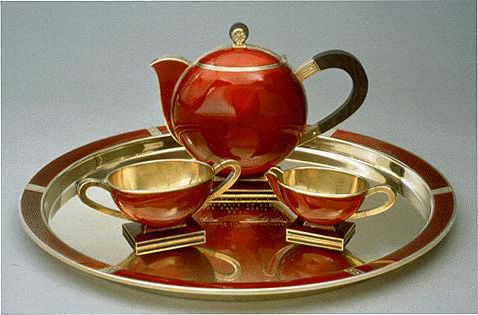
Gold and enamel tea set made by David Andersen in the 1930s, as a royal gift from the Norwegian Crown Prince to President Roosevelt

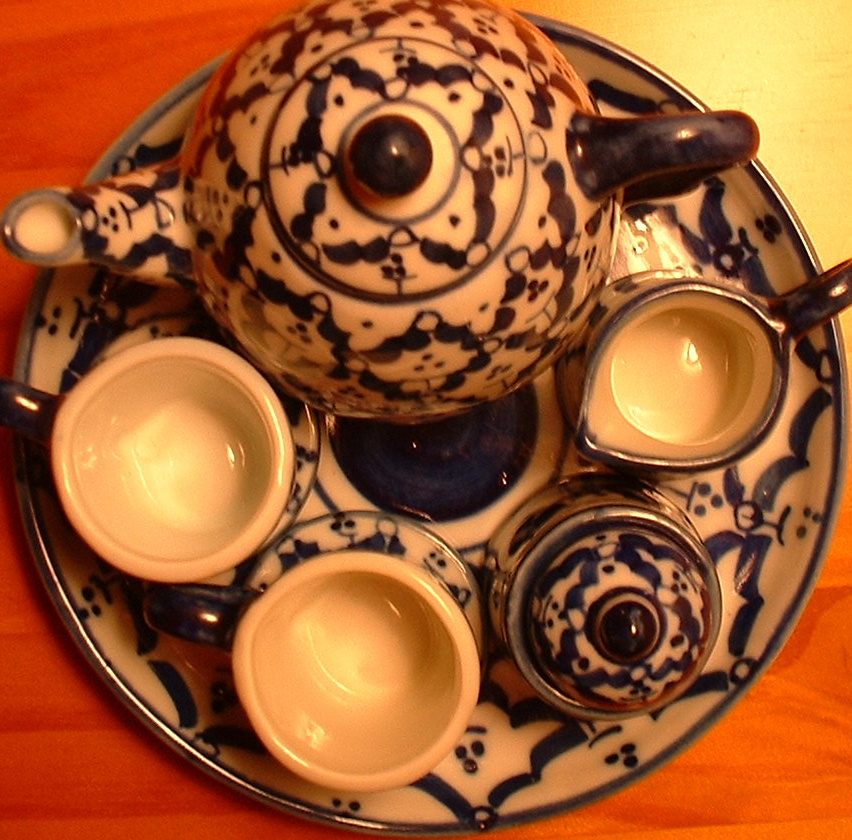
Chinese style doll-sized tea set

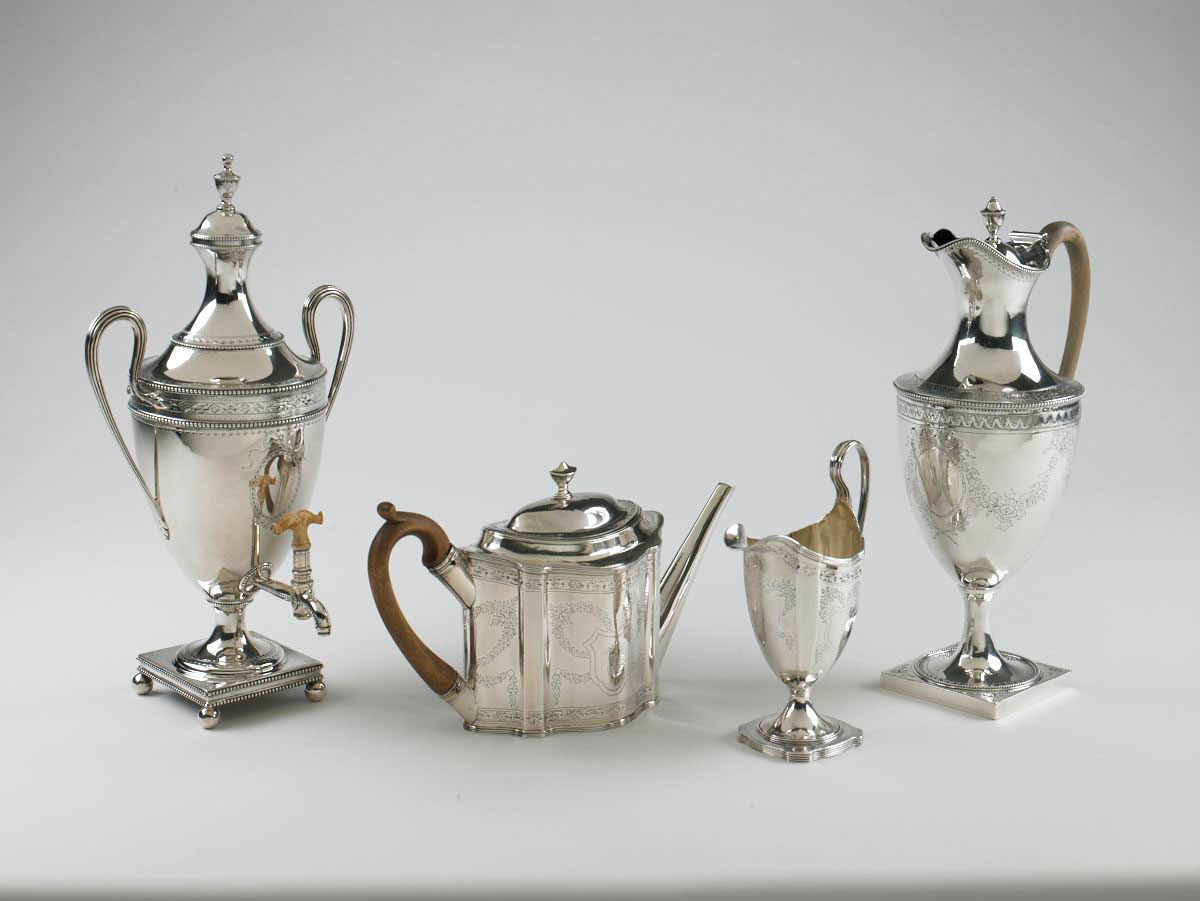
An English silver tea set

== See also ==
- Coffee service
- Teaware

== Sources ==
- Glanville, Philippa (5 November 2013). "Teaware". Silver in England. Routledge. pp. 92–98. ISBN 978-1-136-61170-4.
- Laura C. Martin (11 April 2011). "The Evolution of the European Tea Ware". Tea: The Drink that Changed the World. Tuttle Publishing. ISBN 978-1-4629-0013-8. OCLC 1026988816.
- Roth, Rodris (1961). "Tea Drinking in 18th-Century America: Its Etiquette and Equipage" (PDF). United States National Museum Bulletin. Contributions from the Museum of History and Technology Paper 14. 225. Washington, DC: Smithsonian Institution: 61–91.
- Pettigrew, Jane (2001). A Social History of Tea. National Trust. ISBN 978-0-7078-0289-3. OCLC 1008339683.
- Röschenthaler, Ute (2022-08-16). "Malian Tea Equipment: History and Provenance". A History of Mali's National Drink. Brill Publishers. pp. 154–195. doi:10.1163/9789004524675_006. ISBN 978-90-04-52466-8.
- Von Drachenfels, Susanne (2000). The Art of the Table: A Complete Guide to Table Setting, Table Manners, and Tableware. Simon & Schuster. ISBN 978-0-684-84732-0.
