= Sugar bowl =

Small bowl for holding sugar

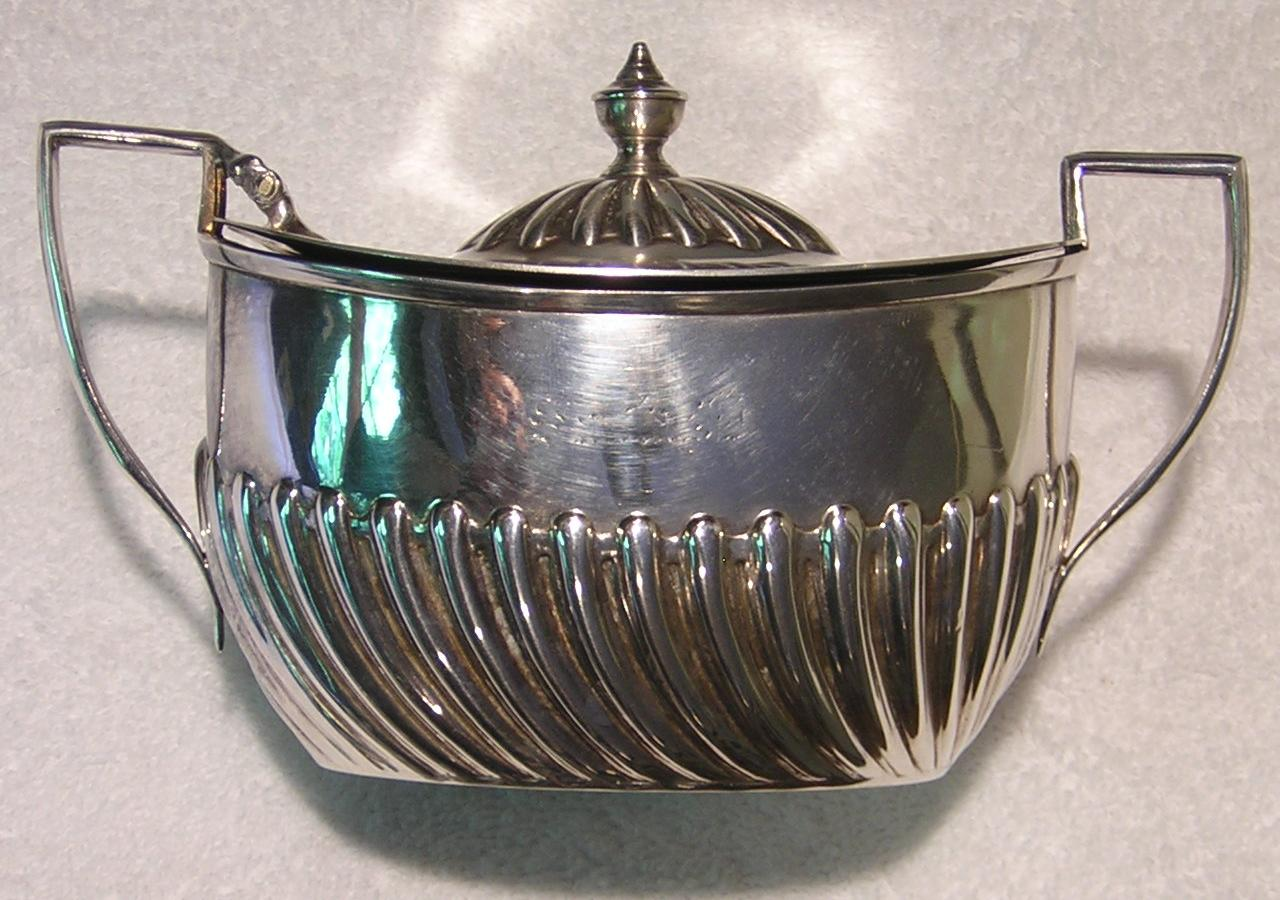
Sugar bowl from the Atchison, Topeka and Santa Fe Railway, made by Harrison Brothers & Howson for dining car service

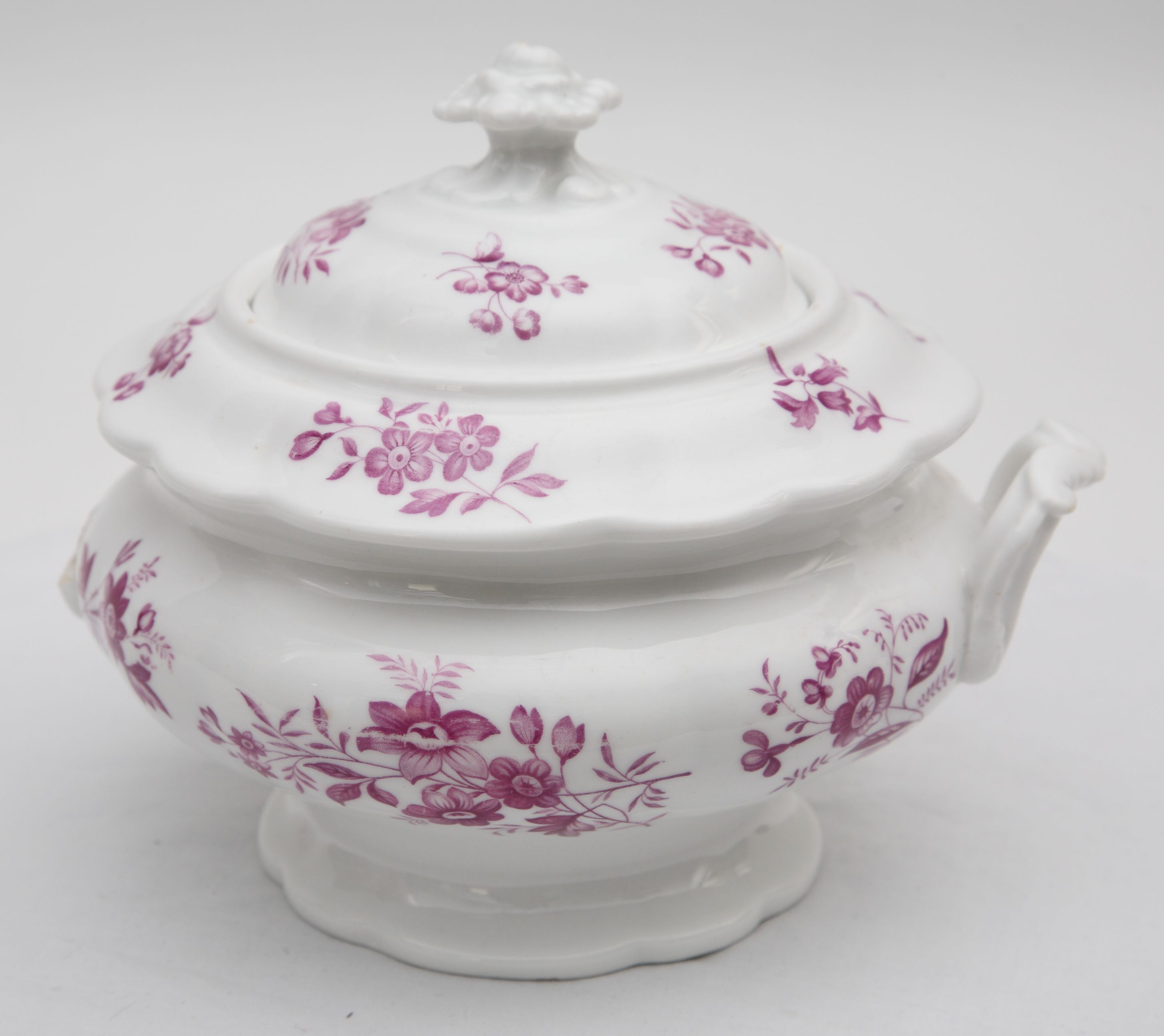
Sugar bowl with purple flower motif

A sugar bowl is a small bowl designed for holding sugar or sugar cubes, to be served with tea or coffee in the Western tradition, that is an integral part of a tea set.

== History ==
From the 1700s, a sugar bowl formed an essential part of English tea services. Tea had begun to be imported from the 17th century, but was expensive and considered a luxury. Tea became easier to acquire once import duties were abolished in 1784.

Throughout the 18th century, tea became increasingly popular. In tandem with this, the consumption of sugar increased four times. This sugar was being supplied by large plantations run by the British in the Caribbean, by enslaved or indentured people. This saw the boycott of sugar between 1792-1793 and 1825-1829 as a way to force parliament to halt the trafficking of enslaved people. For many, sugar bowls produced during this period can be symbols of slavery. During the boycotts, many sugar bowls were produced as agents of protest.

Early sets for drinking tea included few separate little silver containers that were frequently made in pair or sets of three and placed under a lock and key into a case due to the high cost of tea and sugar at the time, with the larger container intended for sugar. The original sugar holders were box-like, they evolved into a shape of a bowl with a close-fitting lid (with the shape similar to the modern designs), later were made of glass or had a glass insert. The second half of the 18th century witnessed the replacement of silver by porcelain in the tea sets in order to match the cups, and the porcelain sugar bowls came into vogue. In 1734, the East India Company imported over a million Chinese porcelain bowls.

The idea of using a matching service with teapot, creamer, and a sugar bowl became popular during the reign of George III, although some very rare examples are older.

== Notable sugar bowls ==
- Gustav IV Adolf of Sweden presented a pair of silver sugar bowls to Johan Sederholm, his godfather, in 1796.
- The Fondazione Palazzo Coronini Cronberg Foundation of Gorizia has a Venetian sugar bowl of the Napoleonic period.
- The book series A Series of Unfortunate Events by Lemony Snicket, as well as the second and third seasons of its Netflix adaptation, come to center around retrieving a mysterious Sugar Bowl, or "vessel for disaccharides". What the Sugar Bowl contains or why it is so important remains shrouded in mystery in the books, although both of these are revealed in the final episodes of the third season.
- In We Have Always Lived in the Castle by Shirley Jackson the sugar bowl is a prominent object used to poison and murder members of the Blackwood Family.

== Sources ==
- Wenham, Edward (June 1927). "Evolution of the tea set". The Antiquarian. VIII (5). New York: 41–46.
