= Coffee service =

Provision of coffee and related items

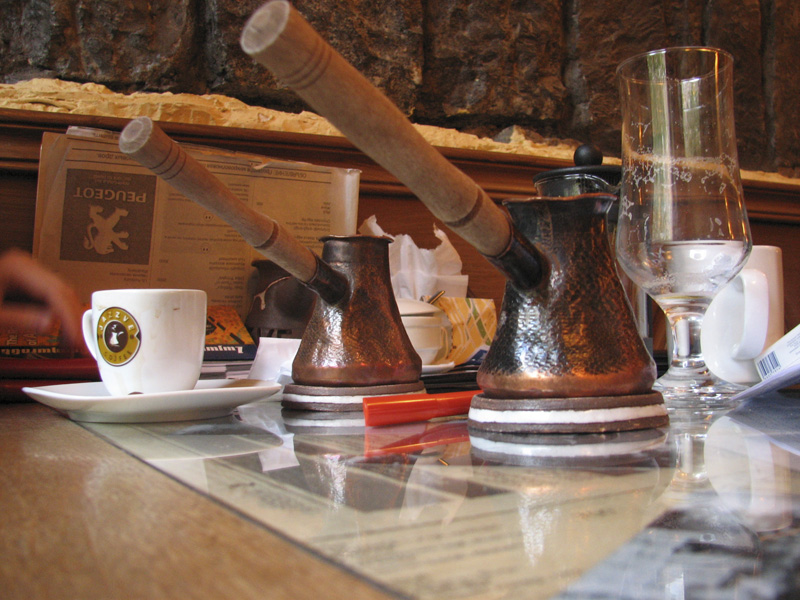
A coffee service in Yerevan, Armenia

Coffee service refers to the way and the customs that coffee is made, served, and served to individuals in different places such as restaurants, hotels, homes, and workplaces. The term is used to refer to both the material containers and serving dishes of coffee like coffee pots, cups, sauces and complete coffee sets, and a system within the organization that serves coffee to employees and guests. Coffee service has been developed in the course of history as a ceremony, sophisticated, and automated systems, which mirror cultural values, social traditions, and technological progress.

== History and cultural significance ==
=== Origins and early development ===
Formalized coffee service was first introduced in the 16th century when coffee was introduced into the Ottoman Empire. Introduced to the Ottoman Empire in the 16th century, coffee came in through Yemen and by the middle of the 16th century coffeehouses were popping up throughout Istanbul as social venues, intellectual discussion centers, and even centers of political debate. Many of the ceremony elements of coffee service that later found their way to European traditions, including Turkish coffee culture, had been codified in ceremonial elements of coffee service instituted by Turkish coffee culture, which was added to the UNESCO Intangible Cultural Heritage List in 2013. The traditions of European coffee service developed during the 17th -18th centuries when coffee became popular among the affluent classes. During the 17th century, coffee was served in small bowls with no handles called Greek cups that were crafted of Chinese export porcelain or the Japanese version of the same. The invention of the European porcelain production in the early 18th century resulted in the introduction of special coffee vessels.

=== Evolution of coffee service sets ===
With the proliferation of coffee, tea and chocolate in the West at the onset of the 18th century, refined tableware as we now know it was conceived. Litron cup debuted at the Vincennes factory in 1752 and this shape became the standard variant of coffee service when the consumption of hot chocolate, tea and coffee started to become more popular. The shape of tea cups developed differently compared to coffee cups thus making the litron shape to be strictly identified with coffee drinking. By the 18th century, the common coffee service was made up of cups, sauces, coffeepots, milk or cream pots, sugar bowls and serving trays. These collections were usually porcelain, silver or silver plate sets, and frequently gilded with fancy decorations of the artistic trends of their times. Famous producers such as Meissen that found the secret of hard paste porcelain in 1709 created coffee services combined with European decorative motifs with technical novelties in the production of porcelains.

== Types of coffee service ==
=== Traditional coffee service sets ===
A typical coffee service set consists of coffee pots with lids and spouts, cups and saucers (usually demitasse size, to serve espresso-style coffee), bowls of sugar with lids, cream or milk pitchers, trays to serve. These sets are still favorable to use on a formal event and they are handed down to heirs. Matter is limited to fine porcelain and bone China, silver, stainless steel, and modern ceramics.

=== Turkish coffee service ===
The Turkish coffee service is a unique mode of preparing coffee with very fine coffee beans that are cooked in special pot known as cezve (or ibrik). The coffee is poured into small cups, leaving the fine grounds to settle in the bottom of the cup. The Turkish coffee tradition is the sign of hospitality, friendship, sophistication and amusement that are present in all aspects of life. A coffee invitation between friends is a chance to have a close conversation and discuss their day-to-day issues. Turkish coffee is also highly significant when it comes to social events like engagement ceremonies and holidays. Traditionally, during the wedding ceremony, the groom family will visit the house of the bride prior to the event, the bride is supposed to make the groom perfect Turkish coffee; in case she liked the groom-to-be she would put sugar in his cup and in case she did not like a certain candidate she would put salt in his coffee cup as well.

=== Hotel and restaurant coffee service ===
Coffee service is an aspect of guest service and satisfaction in the hospitality industry. It has been shown that coffee has developed to play a critically important role to the hotel guest experience. A UCC Coffee survey indicated that 75 percent of hotel guests rated the quality of coffee in the rooms as poor or mediocre, and thirty percent of the respondents stated that the quality of coffee offered in the rooms would make them not come back to the same hotel again. A different survey identified that 60 percent of the population considered quality coffee to be a significant element in their hotel or holiday rental experience. Hotels normally offer coffee in different ways such as continental breakfast service, buffet service with self-service coffee stations, in-room coffee delivery services which are considered part of the room service, lobby coffee stations available day long and in-room coffee makers which the guests can use conveniently. Hotels are also investing more in coffee equipment that is of high quality as it is realized that the quality of coffee is one of the most important factors that determine the satisfaction of guests and online reviews. Extraordinary real estate usually collaborates with specialty coffee or has professional-quality espresso machines installed so that they can respond to the emerging demands of customers. When specialty coffee became popular in the early 2000s, most hotels began paying attention, with the Ace Hotel group being among the first to launch properties with in-house Stumptown Coffee roasters and cafes in their lobbies.

=== Workplace coffee service ===
Workplace Coffee service Employees are able to conveniently access coffee in the workplace at no cost or at a reduced price through coffee service. It was introduced in the early 20th century as a benefit to employees, when employers realized the productivity and morale advantages of offering coffee to employees.

The coffee services in the contemporary workplaces are delivered in different types:

- Vending machines:The automated dispensers which sell different forms of coffee, tea and hot chocolate. These machines will normally be paid or even offer free service as stipulated by the company. Vending machine coffee is also thought to be of inferior quality because of using instant coffee or pre-ground beans.
- Drip coffee makers: Conventional brewing machines that people have in break rooms, commonly with pre-packaged coffee grounds or ground coffee packets that are filtered in envelopes to make them convenient to use.
- Automatic espresso machines: More expensive machines that grind coffee and make beverages based on the espresso. Bypass slots are provided on some of the machines so that the employees can bring their own coffee beans.
- Premium coffee programs:There are those companies that offer on-site espresso bars where the baristas can serve premium drinks free of charge or at reduced cost.

== Benefits of workplace coffee service ==
Studies have shown that the provision of coffee at the workplace has several organizational advantages. Coffee breaks provide workers with an opportunity to have their personal time and reenter the work environment refreshed and re-energized, and the productivity increase is observed at the corporate interest groups (Kotter 24). Research indicates that almost two out of every three people who undergo the survey drink coffee during the day so that they will have enhanced productivity.

Specific benefits identified through research include

- Less absenteeism:Workers do not have to go out of the office to get coffee and this helps save on lost time at work and may save 30 to 60 minutes or more of non-productive time per employee.
- Improved productivity: Caffeine is proven to stimulate mental alertness, cognitive performance, memory, attention and reaction time.
- Better employee morale: Employee morale has been improved, with a 2008 survey by McKinsey and Company researchers showing that 61 percent of employees think their employer cares about their well-being when the company serves hot drinks and that 85 percent of employees think a good cup of coffee lowers work-related stress and enhances employee productivity.
- Social cohesion: Coffee break areas: Coffee break areas are informal meetings where employees can develop relationships and exchange ideas. It has been researched that coffee breaks and spending time off the desk energize the team members and renew their energy, motivation and concentration.

Coffee breaks were regarded as imperative part of the working day that the absence of coffee breaks in the car industry was the major reason that the members of the unions went on strike in the 1960s.

=== Contemporary trends ===
The contemporary coffee service is a demonstration of the changes in consumer preferences and technological opportunities. Examples of trends are specialty coffee services based on single-origin beans, alternative brewing techniques, plant-based milk substitutes like soy, almond, oat, and coconut milk, smart coffee machines, such as touchscreen interfaces and customizable beverage models, sustainability, such as fair-trade sourcing, and waste minimization, and a sophisticated self-service experience allowing customers to make barista-quality coffee themselves.

=== Cultural variations ===
Cultural practices of coffee service are quite different. The Turkish tradition includes fortunetelling (tasseography) using coffee grounds during preparation ceremonies. The Italian espresso culture focuses on speed and serving coffee bars, and there are certain hours of the day when various drinks are to be served. Scandinavian fika is an institutionalized culture of coffee break that focuses on social interrelation. Hospitality traditions of the Middle East make coffee service one of the main aspects of guest reception. The American coffee culture is more about big volume consumption that is characterized by convenience and personalization.

== See also ==
- Tea service
- Turkish coffee
- Coffeehouse
- Employee benefits
- Room service
- Espresso machine
