= Johann Friedrich Böttger =

German alchemist (1682–1719)

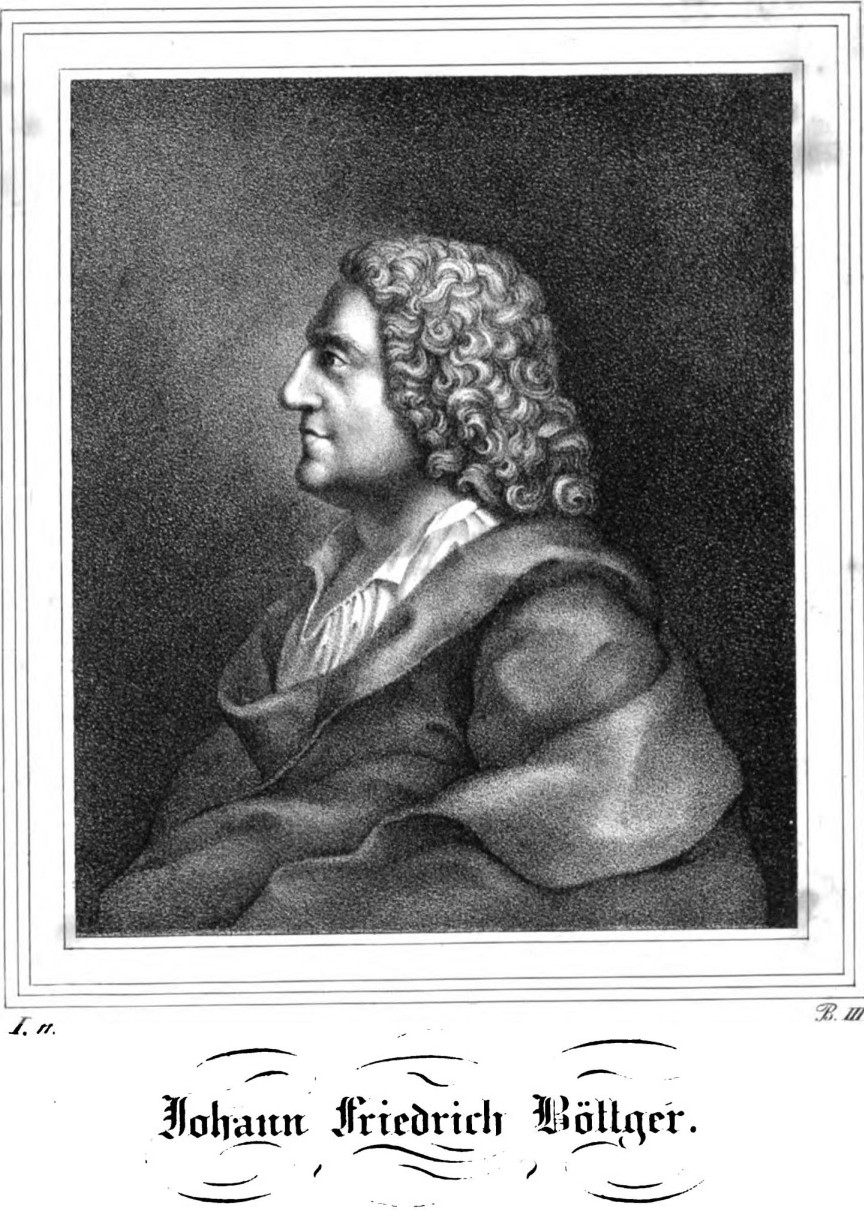
- Johann Friedrich Böttger

Johann Friedrich Böttger (also Böttcher or Böttiger; 4 February 1682 – 13 March 1719) was a German alchemist. Böttger was born in Schleiz and died in Dresden. He is normally credited with being the first European to discover the secret of the creation of hard-paste porcelain in 1708, but it has also been claimed that English manufacturers or Ehrenfried Walther von Tschirnhaus produced porcelain first. Certainly, the Meissen factory, established 1710, was the first to produce porcelain in Europe in large quantities and since the recipe was kept a trade secret by Böttger for his company, experiments continued elsewhere throughout Europe.

== Biography ==
On Thursday, 5 February 1682, Johann Friedrich Böttger was baptized in Schleiz as the third child of his parents. His father was a mint master in Schleiz. His mother was the daughter of the Magdeburg councilor Pflug. In 1682 the family moved to Magdeburg. In the same year his father died. In 1685 his mother married the also widowed town major and engineer Johann Friedrich Tiemann. This was largely responsible for the versatile training of the young Böttger.

Around 1700, as an 18-year-old apprentice chemist with the pharmacist Zorn in Berlin - Böttger, also an alchemist in pursuit of the philosopher's stone, locked himself away to discover in private the Alltinktur or Goldmachertinktur (direct translation: gold/maker/tincture), an alchemist's secret substance with which supposedly any disease could be cured and base metals converted into gold, as was much en vogue at the time. His activities did not stay secret for long and soon he was regarded as an adept in alchemy. When King Frederick I of Prussia learned of this, he requested that Böttger be taken into protective custody. Böttger escaped, but was detained and taken back to Dresden. The monarch of Saxony Augustus II of Poland (aka. Augustus II the Strong), who was always short of money, demanded that Böttger produce the so-called Goldmachertinktur in order to convert base metals into gold. Imprisoned in a dungeon, Böttger toiled away many a year, at many a noxious concoction, attempting to produce the 'gold making tincture' and, therefore, to regain his freedom.

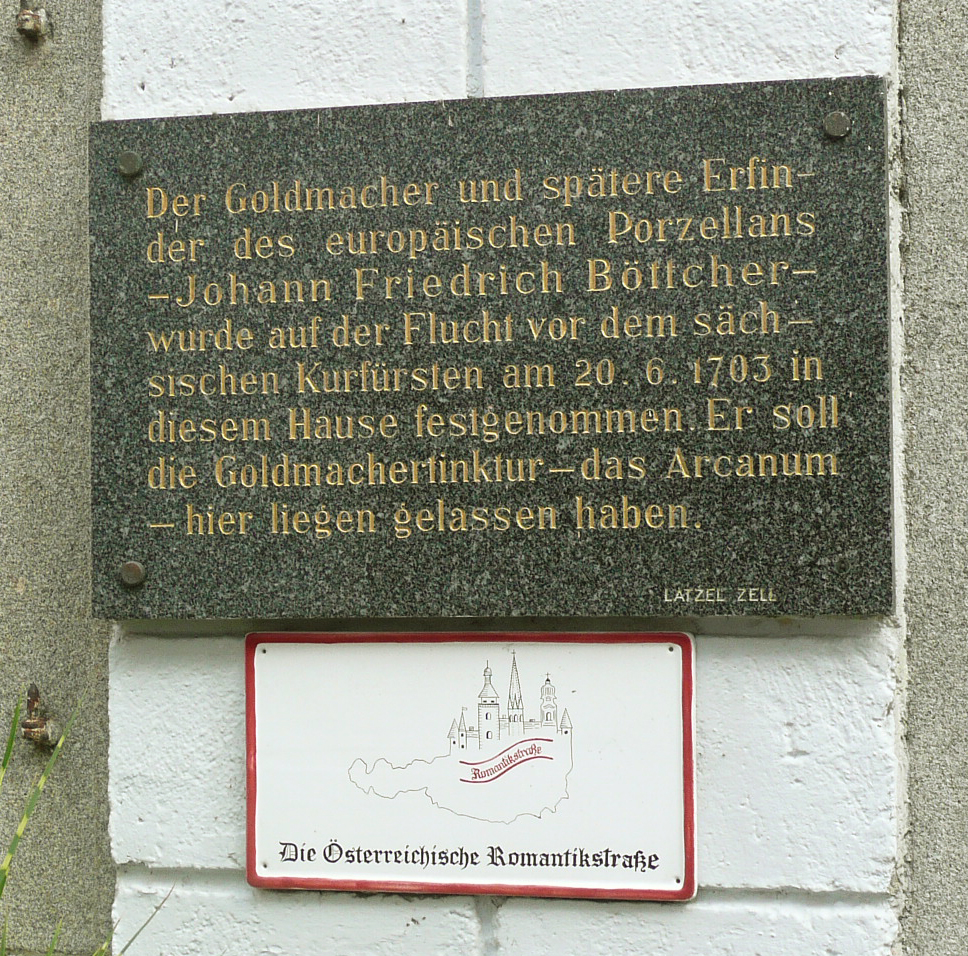
Böttger was detained in Enns (Upper-Austria) in June 1703.

In 1704, impatient with no progress, the monarch ordered scientist Ehrenfried Walther von Tschirnhaus to oversee the young goldmaker. At first Böttger had no interest in von Tschirnhaus' own experiments, but with no results of his own and by then fearing for his life, by September 1707 he slowly started cooperating. He did not wish to be involved with porcelain, which he thought was von Tschirnhaus' business, but ordered by the monarch and probably thinking the deciphering of porcelain's secrets his only option left (as then, second to gold) to both satisfy the monarch's greed and save his own neck, he began cooperating in earnest. Presumably by involving Böttger in his experiments, von Tschirnhaus spared him the fate that overtook many former alchemist adventurers.

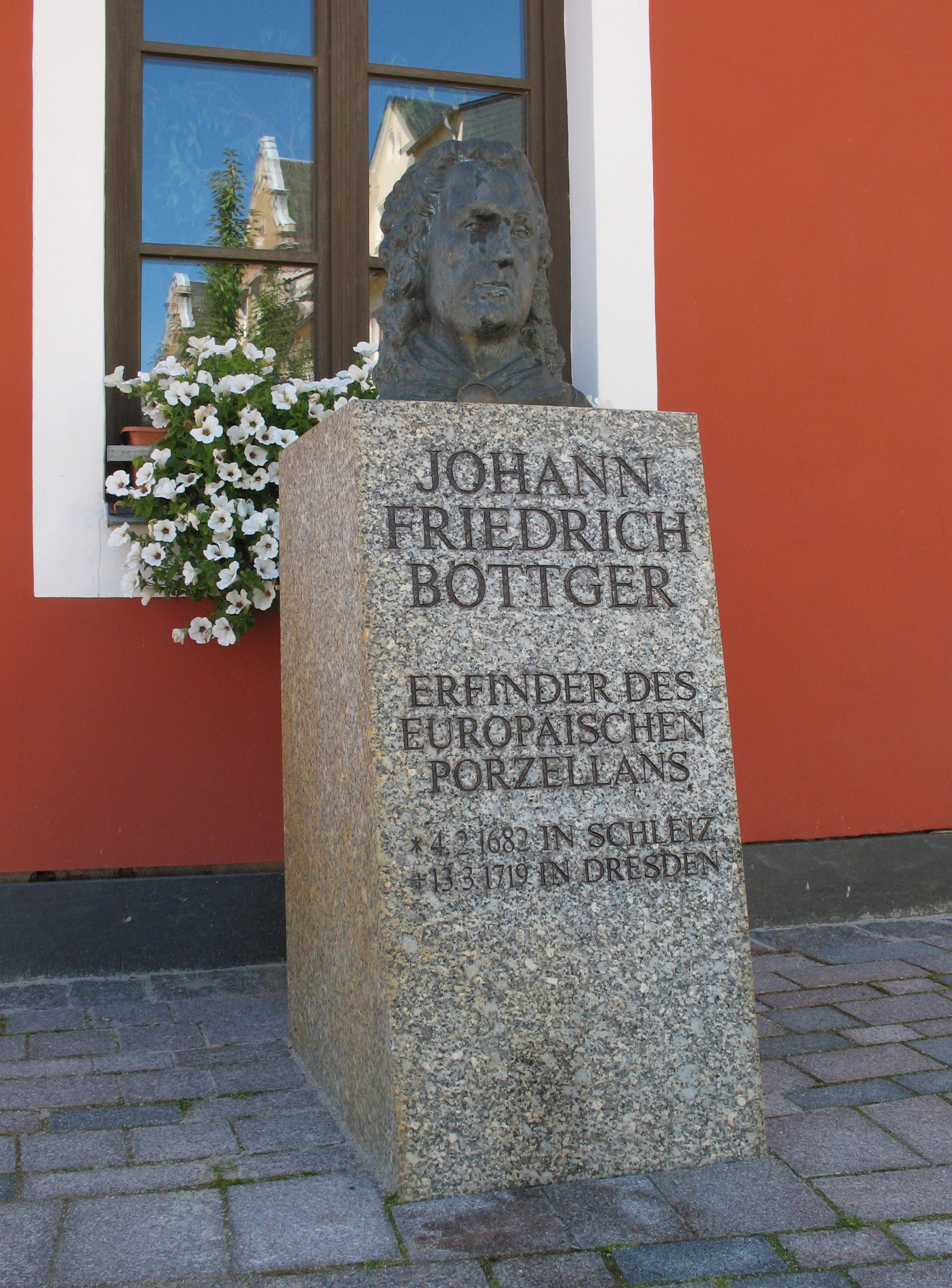
Memorial in Schleiz

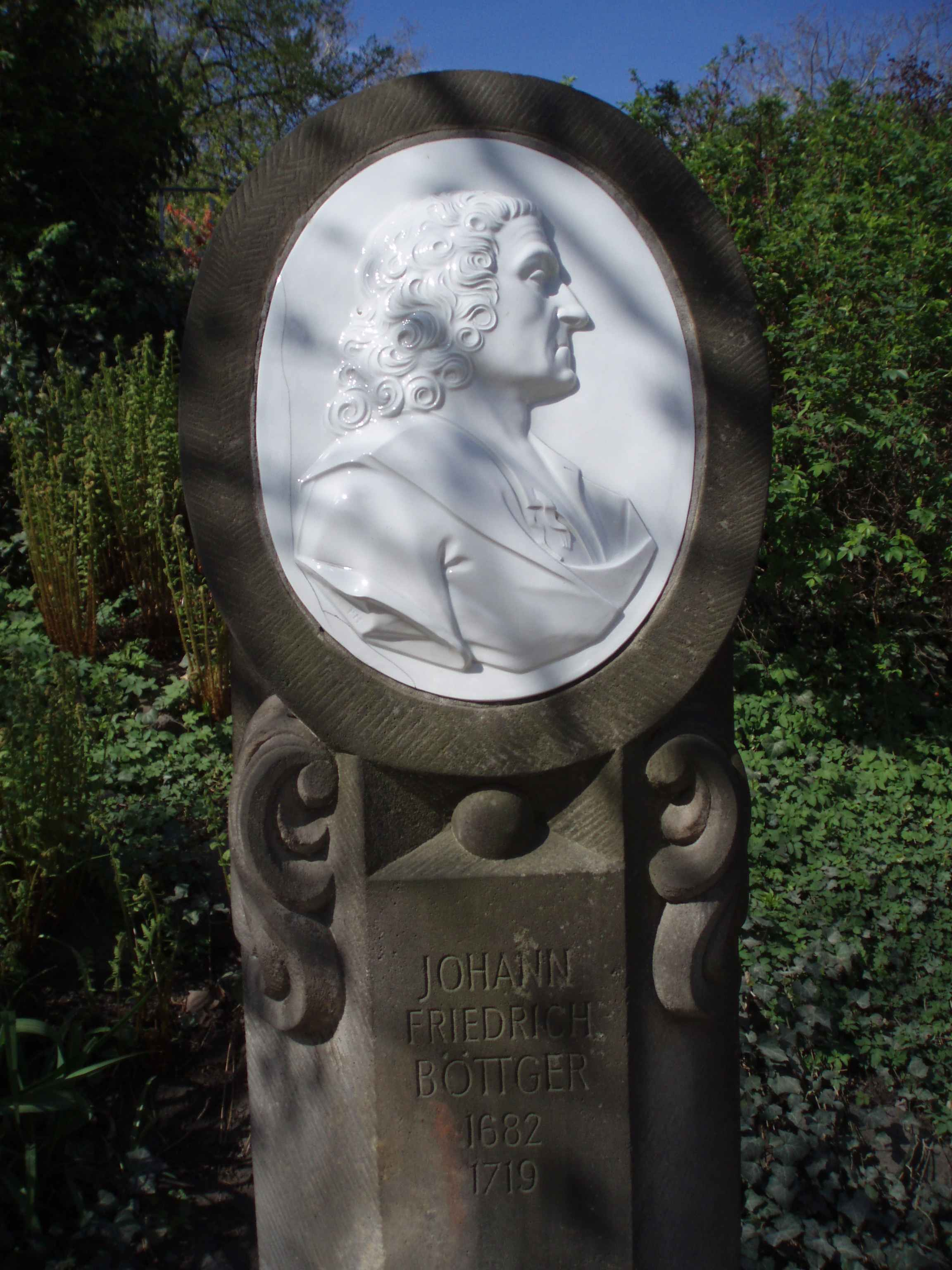
Böttger monument in Dresden

In December 1707 the king went to the new laboratory that had been furnished for von Tschirnhaus in what is today Brühlsche Terrasse in order to examine the progress on their experiments.

Under von Tschirnhaus' supervision and with the assistance of miners and metal workers from Freiberg, experiments with different clays continued. Substantial progress was achieved in 1708 when two shipments of minerals proved to be suitable: a sample of very fine, pure white clay - kaolin from Schneeberg and alabaster as flux material. After years of experimentation, two more critical ingredients - China Stone (a decomposed volcanic mineral) and Quartz (at 20%) were found. When all are blended and heated to at least 1300 degrees celsius, finally produced the desired results.

August the Strong appointed von Tschirnhaus to Privy Council and director of a manufacture which was still to be set up. He decreed "that von Tschirnhausen was to be paid off 2561 Thaler". Von Tschirnhaus asked to earn this title only after the production had been started. When von Tschirnhaus died suddenly, on 11 October 1708, the project came to a halt.

The origins of porcelain date back to 200 BC. One thousand years later, the production of translucent porcelain succeeded in China, and Chinese porcelain became known in Europe through trade, arousing admiration and envy, but its composition and method of manufacture were a mystery. Porcelain was valued as equal to silver and gold and indeed was also referred to as white gold. Until 20 March 1709, when Melchior Steinbrück arrived in Dresden, the porcelain works were suspended. Steinbrück was the tutor of von Tschirnhaus' family and now was in charge of administering the estate. Among others he got hold of the formula to make porcelain. On 20 March 1709 Steinbrück signed the list of assets before a notary and met Böttger, who suddenly on 28 March 1709 notified the king about the invention of porcelain. Böttger became head of the first porcelain manufacture in Europe. His(their?) discovery of porcelain forever transformed the fortunes of the West.

In 1719 the arcanist Samuel Stölzel escaped from Meissen to Vienna and betrayed the secret of porcelain production. He claimed that Tschirnhaus and not Böttger had discovered porcelain. Also in 1719 the secretary general of the manufacture in Meißen, Caspar Bussius reported: "that the invention of porcelain is not due to Böttger but von Tschirnhaus and that Böttger received the written 'science' from Steinbrück".

In a later report from 1731, Peter Mohrenthal wrote: "All of Saxony will remember von Tschirnhaus and his fame will persist forever, as long as the porcelain factory in Meissen is unique besides the Chinese one... Since Mr. Tschirnhaus is the first who luckily found the secret to porcelain while the reputed baron Böttger later worked out the details... Because death disrupted all endeavours of Mr. von Tschirnhaus, which the world can not pay for with gold."

== Böttger ware ==
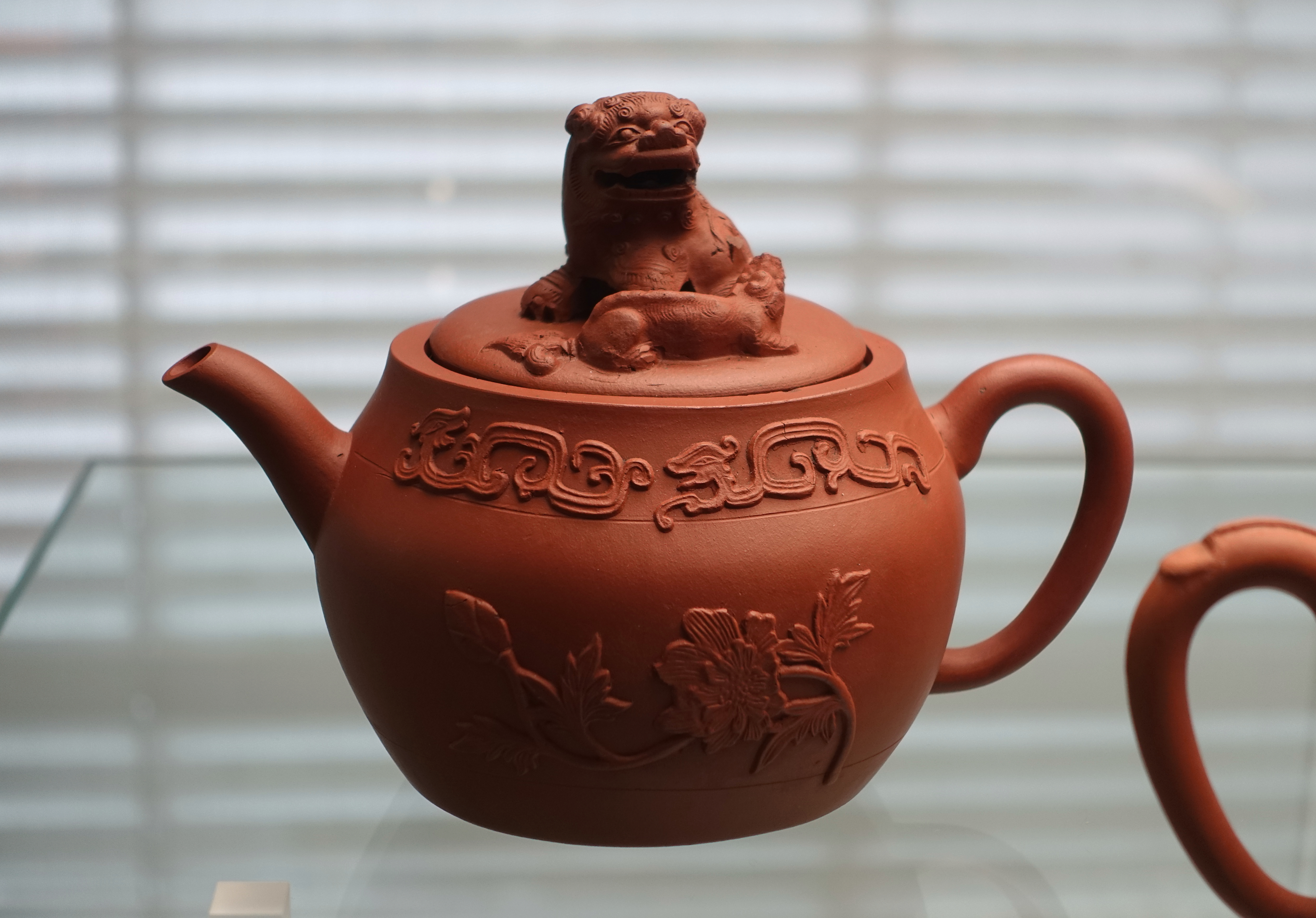
Meissen teapot, Böttger ware c. 1710

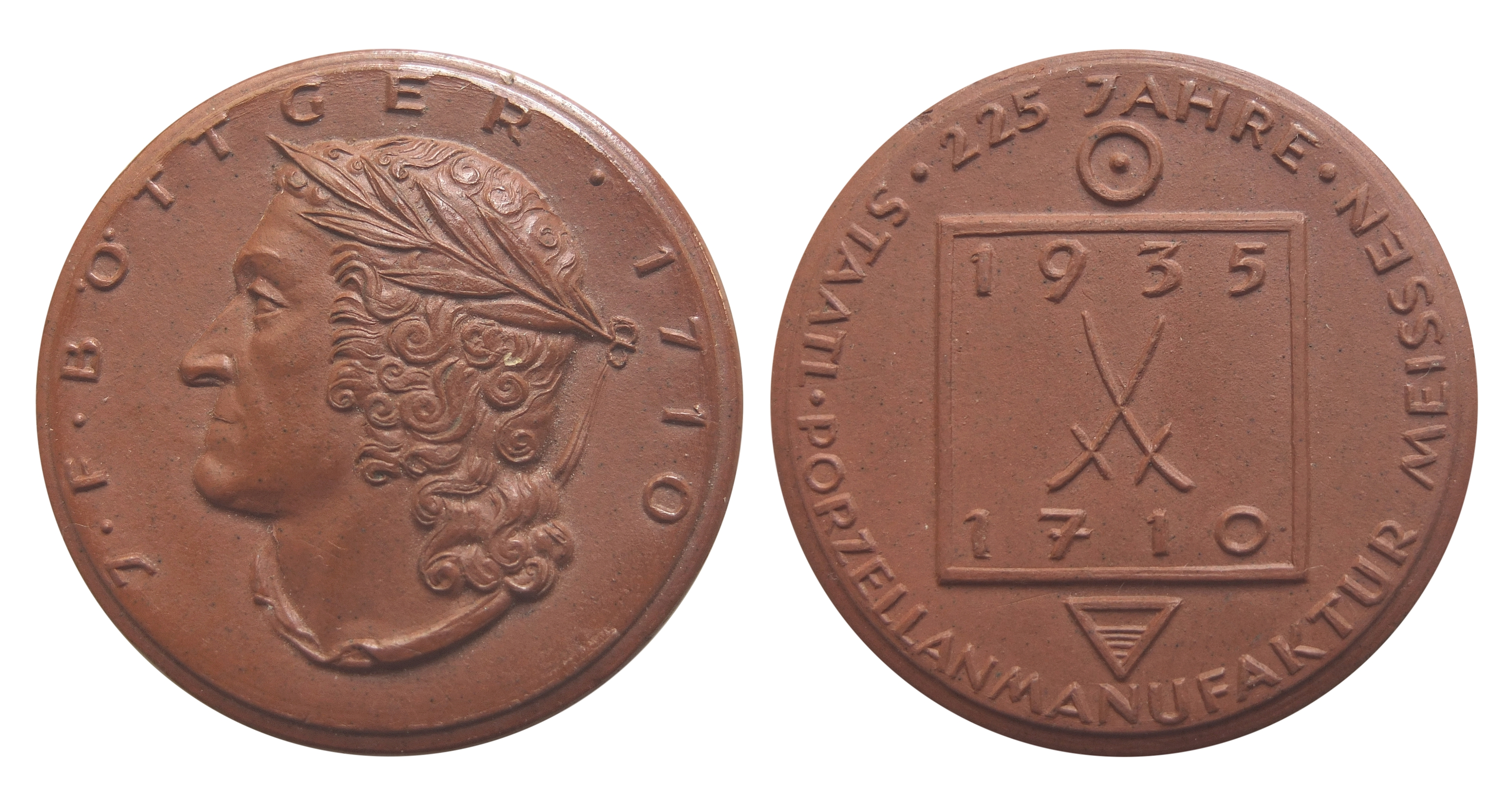
Medal for the 225th anniversary of the porcelain factory in Meissen (1935), depicting the portrait of the inventor

In the late 17th century Chinese Yixing clay teapots, made of special Yixing clay, were imported to Europe along with China tea. They had long been popular in China, as the unglazed stoneware is said to improve the taste of tea. The unfamiliar material inspired attempts to imitate it, and one Delftware manufacturer announced in 1678 that he was making "red teapots", of which no examples are known to survive. Some red stoneware by rival Dutch potters from about 1700 survives, closely copying Yixing pots in style (the Elers brothers made similar wares in England in the 1690s). Böttger was in contact with some of these and developed a rival "Böttger ware", a dark red stoneware first sold in 1710, and manufactured and imitated by others, all up to about 1740. It is a very significant stage in the development of porcelain in Europe.

== In literature ==
The story of Johann Friedrich Böttger is the theme of Gustav Meyrink's Goldmachergeschichten. His name is changed to Johann Friedrich Bötticher.

- Hans-Joachim Böttcher. Böttger – Vom Gold- zum Porzellanmacher. Dresden 2011. ISBN 978-3-941757-31-8.

In fiction, Böttger's story features in Bruce Chatwin's 1988 Booker-nominated novel, Utz.
