= Gongfu tea =

Chinese method of brewing tea

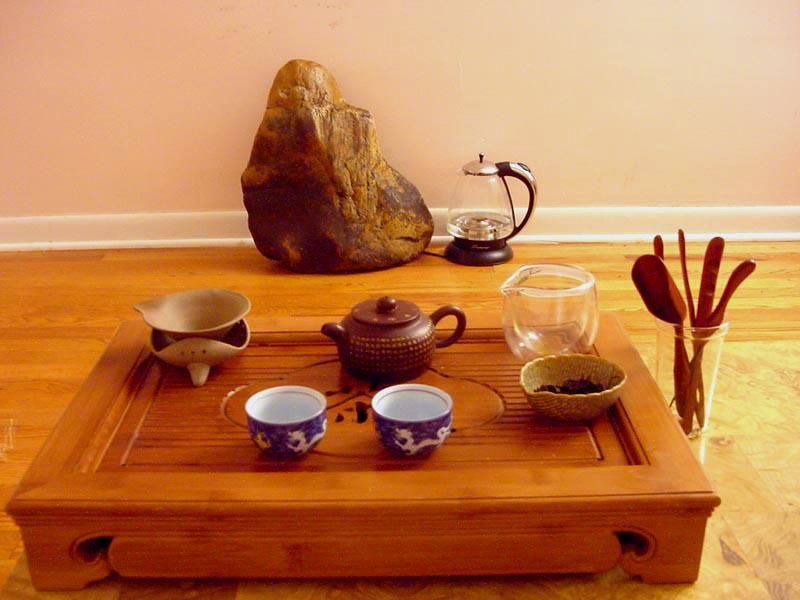
A gongfu tea table with accessories

Gongfu tea (Teochew: gang1 hu1 dê5) or kung fu tea (Chinese: 工夫茶 or 功夫茶; both gōngfū chá), literally "making tea with skill", is a traditional Chinese tea preparation method. It is sometimes called a "tea ceremony", though this is a misnomer, as gongfu cha is more accurately described as a specialised technique of brewing tea rather than a ritualised ceremony. It is probably based on the tea preparation approaches originating in Fujian and the Chaoshan area of eastern Guangdong. The term Gongfu (工夫) in Chaoshan dialect means the technique is meticulous, subtle, graceful and exquisite as well as requiring patience and experience to perfect. The practice involves using smaller brewing vessels and a more potent leaf-to-water ratio than in Western-style brewing. Today, the approach is used popularly by teashops carrying tea of Chinese or Taiwanese origin, and by aficionados and trained masters as a way to fully realize the taste of a tea selection, especially a finer one.

== History ==
Attention to tea-making quality has been a classic Chinese tradition. All teas, loose tea, coarse tea, and powdered tea have long coexisted with the "imperially appointed compressed form". By the end of the 14th century, the more naturalistic "loose leaf" form had become a popular household product and by the Ming era, loose tea was put to imperial use.

The related teaware that is the tea pot and later the gaiwan lidded cup were evolved. It is believed that the gongfu approach began around the 18th century. Some scholars think that it began in Wuyi (Bohea) Mountains in Fujian, where the production of oolong tea for export began; others believe that it was the people of Chaozhou in the Chaoshan area in Guangdong started this particular part of the tea culture.

Oral history from the 1940s still referred to gongfu tea as "Chaoshan gongfu tea". It is likely that regardless of the earliest incidence of the approach, the place that first successfully integrated it into daily life was Chaoshan area. Chaozhou is recognized by some as the capital of gongfu tea.

== Water preparation ==
In essence, what is desired in gongfu tea is a brew that tastes good and is satisfying to the soul. Tea masters in China and other East Asian tea cultures study for years to perfect this method. However, method alone will not determine whether a great cup of tea will be produced. Essentially, two things have to be taken into consideration: chemistry and temperature.

=== Water chemistry ===
Water should be given careful consideration when performing gongfu tea. Water which tastes or smells bad will adversely affect the brewed tea. However, distilled or extremely soft water should never be used as this form of water lacks minerals, which will negatively affect the flavor of the tea and so can result in a "flat" brew. For these reasons, most tea masters will use a good clean local source of spring water. If this natural spring water is not available, bottled spring water will suffice. Yet high content mineral water also needs to be avoided. It is said that hard water needs to be filtered although the mineral content of even very hard water is solvated, and no amount of filtering will affect it.

=== Temperature ===
During the process of gongfu tea, the tea preparer will determine the appropriate temperature for the tea being used in order to extract the desired flavors and aromas. This temperature must be reached and maintained. The water temperature depends on the type of tea used. Guidelines are as follows:

- 70–85 °C (158–185 °F) for green tea. 80 °C (176 °F) is typical.
- 75–90 °C (167–194 °F) for white tea. 85 °C (185 °F) is typical.
- 80–90 °C (176–194 °F) for oolong tea. 85 °C (185 °F) is typical.
- 90–95 °C (194–203 °F) for black tea (红茶 (Hóngchá)). 90 °C (194 °F) is typical.
- 95–100 °C (203–212 °F) for dark tea and pu'er 99 °C (210 °F) is typical.
- 90–100 °C (194–212 °F) or near-boiling to fully-boiling for pu'er, a subcategory of dark tea produced in Yunnan and considered independent of other fermented teas.
  - 90 °C (194 °F) is typical for young raw pu'er. Higher temperatures can provoke intense bitterness.
  - 100 °C (212 °F), fully-boiling, is typical for aged raw pu'er and ripe pu'er. Yixing teapots are an ideal choice for these teas since they retain heat better than porcelain.

Generally, cooler water is best for less-oxidized varieties such as green teas and Taiwan oolongs. Hotter water is suitable for more heavily-oxidized teas (e.g., red tea), as well as fermented teas like pu'er. Lower temperatures highlight sweetness and smoothness but may not extract the full potential of darker teas, while higher temperatures emphasize brightness and intensity but can "scald" light, delicate teas, leading to excessive astringency and/or bitterness.

The temperature of the water can be determined by timing, as well as the size and the sizzling sound made by the air bubbles in the kettle.

- At 75–85 °C (167–185 °F), the bubbles formed are known as "crab eyes" and are about 3 millimetres (0.12 in) in diameter. They are accompanied by loud, rapid sizzling sounds.
- At 90–95 °C (194–203 °F), the bubbles, which are now around 8 millimetres (0.31 in) in diameter and accompanied by less frequent sizzling sounds and a lower sizzling pitch, are dubbed "fish eyes".
- When the water is boiling, neither the formation of air bubbles nor sizzling sounds occurs.

At high altitudes, water boils at lower temperatures, so the above temperature ranges should be adjusted.

== Teaware and utensils ==
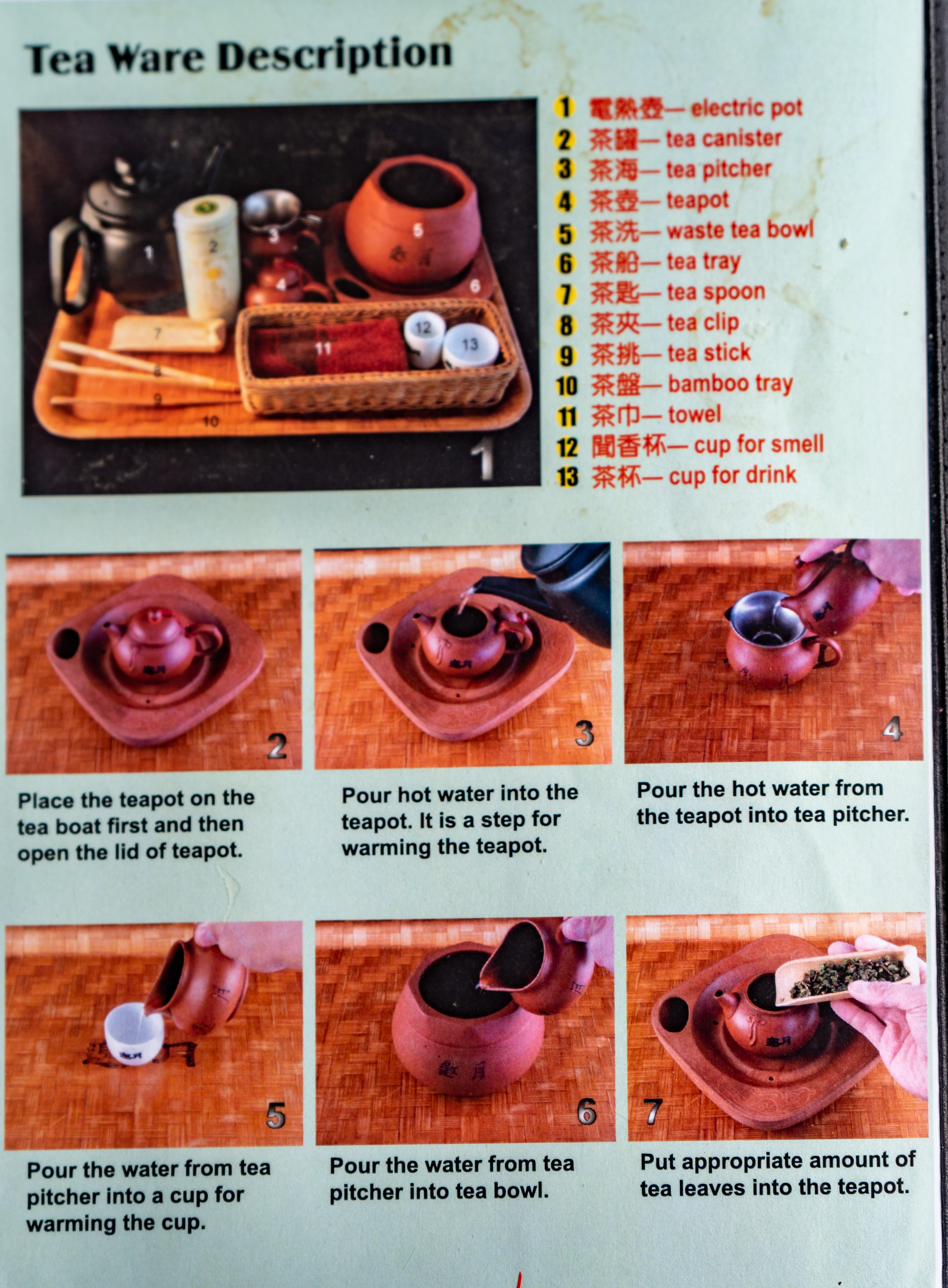
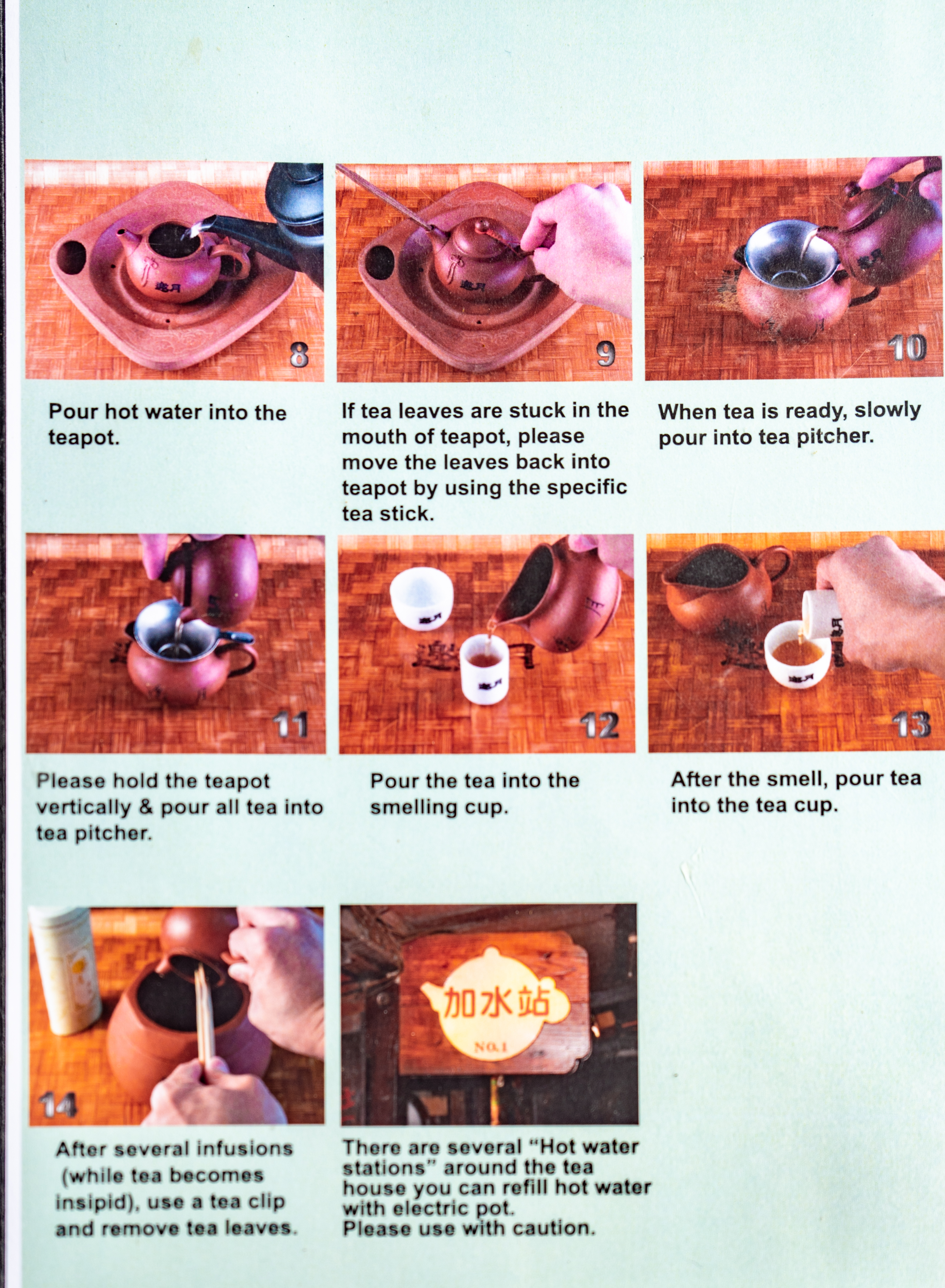
Instructions for gongfu style brewing showcasing the various utensils and teaware, from a Taipei teahouse, Taiwan

Below is a list of the main items used in brewing tea gongfu-style in Taiwan, known there as laoren cha (老人茶; lǎorénchá; 'old men's tea').

1. Brewing vessel such as a teapot (茶壶=chá hú) made from clay, porcelain, and glass such as a Yixing teapot, or a gaiwan. Gongfu brewing vessels are almost always smaller than Western ones, often with a liquid capacity between 60 and 200 mL. The small size allows for a high ratio of tea to water and, thus, maximum control of flavor.
2. Tea pitcher (茶海; cháhǎi) or Fairness cup (公道杯; gōngdào bēi), used to hold tea after brewing and prevent over-steeping (excess tannin extraction). Decanting brewed tea into a pitcher first rather than directly into the cups, ensures that all guests receive tea of the same strength.
3. Hot water boiler (e.g., an electric kettle)
4. Tea tray or tea boat (茶盘; chápán), a wooden tray or a flat bottom porcelain plate to hold spills (spills are common). Many gongfu brewing trays feature a water reservoir as a base and a slotted top; wastewater can be poured or spilled onto these trays and is caught/stored below.
5. Tea towel, often dark-colored for concealing stains.
6. Tea knife or needle for separating leaves from compressed tea cakes.
7. Teapot needle for clearing the teapot spout.
8. Tea cups (traditionally, three are used) of matching size, typically between 25 and 100 mL. Thin, white porcelain cups are popular since they diffuse excessive heat and display the color of tea liquor accurately. The low profile of thin porcelain also allows the drinker to focus on the consistency of the tea during sipping and aerate it easily.
9. Tea strainer (漏斗; lòudǒu; liō-tó͘) to separate leaf sediment from the tea liquor to be served.
10. Tea presentation vessel (茶荷; cháhé) for weighing and dispensing dry leaves, and/or a wooden tea spoon (茶匙; cháchí) to measure the amount of tea leaves required.
11. Tea basin or bowl used as a receptacle for spent tea leaves and wastewater.
12. Optional: Scale for weighing tea leaves, preferably accurate to 0.1 grams or more accurate.
13. Optional: A timer, often used by beginners to track infusion times precisely. Experienced practitioners can gauge tea preparation parameters more intuitively and are able to brew many teas "by feel."
14. Optional: Kitchen thermometer (in the absence of a temperature-controlled kettle).
15. Optional: Aroma cup for appreciating the tea's scent (聞香杯; wénxiāng bēi).
16. Optional: A pair of tongs or tweezers for grasping tea leaves or handling small vessels with hot water safely. Known as chájiā (茶夹) or gia̍p in the Minnan dialects of Chaozhou and elsewhere.
17. Optional: A calligraphy-style brush to spread liquid evenly over the tea tray so that tea oils are spread evenly. These oils cause a wooden tray to develop an attractive patina with repeated use.

A tea pet, often made from the same clay as a Yixing teapot, adds aesthetic appeal to a tea session. Traditionally, these "pets" are classical Chinese figurines, such as a dragon, lion, turtle, or toad, over which tea water is poured, usually to develop a patina.

== Procedure ==
The procedure consists of several steps and can look like this.

1. Rinse a pot with hot water to heat it.
2. Add tea leaves and rinse with some more hot water, immediately pouring it away.
3. Pour hot water on the leaves again, this time let them infuse for a short period of time. Often initial pourings are as short at 10-15 seconds, with subsequent pourings increasing in duration.
4. In some practices the tea is poured into a cha hai, or sharing cup, where it can blend into a more uniform composition.
5. Pour the tea in a drinking/tasting cup, and perhaps a second cup for smelling.

Teas meant for this ceremony can infuse several times.

== Features ==
Teochew speakers refer to drinking tea as “eating tea” (食茶；Teochew:ziah8 dê5). After gongfu tea is poured into the small cups, the host will invite everyone to drink by simply saying “eat” (食；Teochew:ziah8), and the guests respond with the same word. When the host offers a cup with both hands, guests are expected to receive it respectfully with both hands as well. Teochew people call the act of making tea “chhong‑tê” (沖茶, brewing tea) or “bo‑tê” (煲茶, literally “boiling tea”). The term bo‑tê may be a linguistic remnant of Tang‑dynasty tea practices preserved in the Teochew dialect, or it may reflect that early Teochew gongfu tea preparation resembled the Tang‑era method of boiling tea.

== Notable masters ==
- Yu Hui Tseng

== See also ==
- East Asian tea ceremony
- Doucha (闘茶)
