= Gu Jingzhou =

Chinese ceramic artist (1915–1996)

Gu Jingzhou simplified Chinese: 顾景舟; traditional Chinese: 顧景舟; pinyin: Gù Jǐngzhōu (18 October 1915 – 3 June 1996) was a Chinese ceramic artist who specialised in the creation of zisha-ware teapots. He was a founder and Deputy Director of Research and Technology at the Number One Yixing Factory.

Gu lived in Yixing, Jiangsu, a city noted for its pottery. In his early career he worked for an antique dealer named Lang Yushu, and it was during this time that he was exposed to many pieces of classical zisha (purple clay) pottery, a style which he emulated in his own work. He wrote and researched the topic of zisha-ware extensively, and was granted the title "Master of Chinese Industrial Art" (中国工艺美术大师). He was one of seven artisans recruited by the Yixing authorities in the 1950s to train a new generation of purple clay ceramicists; the group later became known as the "seven great masters of purple clay".

Works by Gu are highly valued. In 2015 a ten-piece purple clay tea set of his sold at auction in Beijing for 92 million yuan (about US$14.3 million), a record price for the form; some 30 of his pots and tea sets have each fetched more than 10 million yuan at auction.

== Gallery ==
Selected works
Title	Image	Description
Gong Chun Hu		Gu's rendition of the Gong Chun teapot, a classical form whose original, today at the National Museum of China, is said by legend to have been made by a monk's servant at the Jinsha temple in Yixing. Its flattened spherical shape with its irregular surface imitates a tree canker.
Ling Hua Hu		The body of the Water caltrop teapot consists of six equal sections whose design was inspired by the water caltrop (Trapa bispinosa; 菱; líng). Its edges are perfectly balanced. The veins of the leaves converge to the centre, and the bottom slightly caves in.
Zhe Gu Ti Liang Hu		The Chinese francolin–High Beam teapot (鹧鸪提梁壶) is named after the Chinese francolin, a partridge-like bird of southern China and Southeast Asia. Its handle rises high above the short, cylindrical body to which it connects.
Zuo You Lan Yan		This teapot made of red Yixing clay was created for the National Craftspeople Conference, and combines several traditional features of Yixing clay teapots.
Yun Jian Ru Yi Hu		The Cloud collar–Ruyi teapot takes its name from the traditional "cloud collar" pattern and the ruyi sceptre, both symbols of good luck. The design of the pot is simple and traditional. The cloud collar rests on the "shoulders" of the body, and the knob of the lid has the shape of a lotus blossom.
Zangliu Choujiao Hu		All sections of this teapot are hexagonal in shape. Its body is spherical and slightly flattened. The rectangular and round elements fit together harmoniously, creating an overall impression of boldness.
Yu Lu Tian Xing Hu		The Rain-Dew-Stars–High Beam teapot combines straight and curved lines, whose turning points are clean and flowing. The boldness of the lower part balances the dynamics of the upper section.
Jing Lan Hu		The Well brim teapot is slightly curved, and the walls of its body converge as they rise. The balance point of the handle is slightly offset.
Hui Wen Zhu Hu		The body of the Bamboo teapot has been given the shape of an old bamboo stem, while the spout represents a new shoot sprouting from the old stalk.

== Literature ==
- Xu, Feng (2015). 布衣壶宗：顾景舟传 [The Plain-Robed Master of Pots: A Biography of Gu Jingzhou] (in Chinese). Jiangsu Literature and Art Publishing House. ISBN 9787539985602.
- Gu, Jingzhou (1992). Yixing zi sha zhen shang 宜兴紫砂珍赏 [Connoisseurship of Dark-Red Yixing Pottery] (in Chinese). Hong Kong: Joint Publishing. ISBN 9789620409622.
