= Yixing clay teapot =

Ancient Chinese vessel used for the preparation of tea

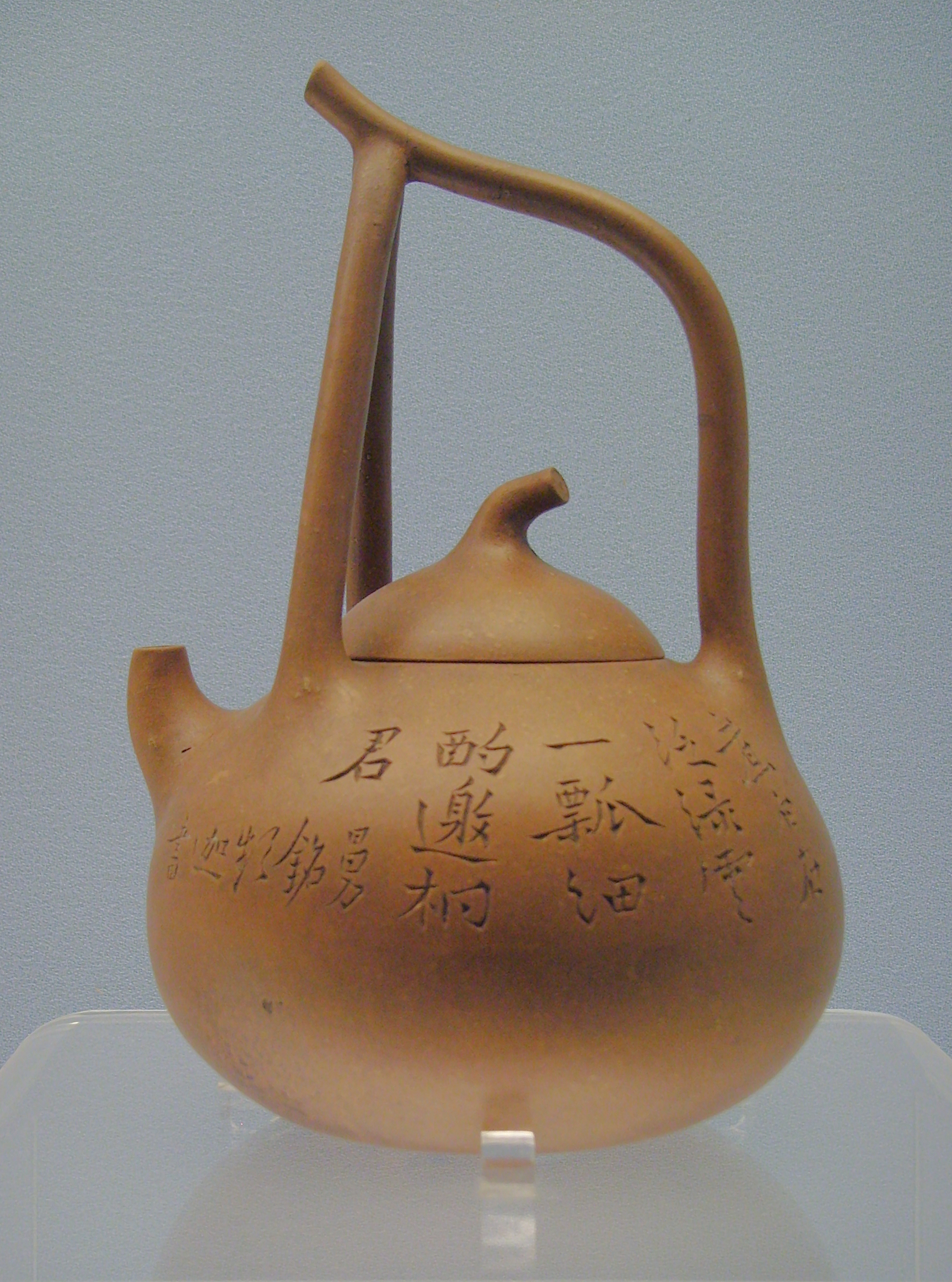
Yixing ware with a "Man Sheng" mark, c. 1900 (Shanghai Museum)

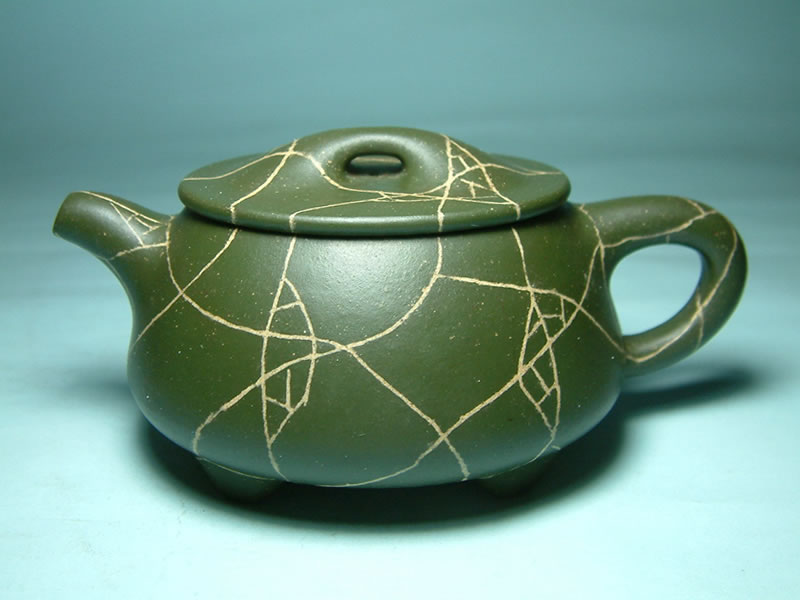
A Yixing Zisha teapot

Yixing clay teapots (simplified Chinese: 宜兴; traditional Chinese: 宜興; pinyin: Yíxīng; Wade–Giles: I-Hsing), also called Zisha teapot (Chinese: 紫砂; pinyin: zǐshā; Wade–Giles: tsu sha; lit. 'Purple clay'), are made from Yixing clay. This traditional style commonly used to brew tea originated in China, dating back to the 15th century, and are made from clay produced near Yixing in the eastern Chinese province of Jiangsu.

== History ==
Archaeological excavations reveal that as early as the Song dynasty (10th century) potters near Yixing were using local "zisha" (紫砂 or 紫泥; literally, "purple sand/clay") to make utensils that may have functioned as teapots. According to the Ming dynasty author Zhou Gaoqi, during the reign of the Zhengde Emperor, a monk from Jinsha Temple (Golden Sand Temple) in Yixing handcrafted a fine quality teapot from local clay. The first Yixing clay teapots were made in the 16th century by monks from the Jinsha Temple. Their use was popularized by Kung Ch'un, who became a servant in the house of Yixing tea master Wu Lun (1440–1522). The new teapots soon became popular with the scholarly class, and the fame of Yixing teapots began to spread.

=== 20th century ===
Yíxīng teapots are actually made in nearby Dīngshān, also known as Dingshu, on the west side of Lake Tai. Hundreds of teapot shops line the edges of the town's crowded streets and it is a popular tourist destination for many Chinese. While Dīngshān is home to dozens of ceramics factories, Yíxīng Zǐshā Factory Number 1, which opened in 1958, processes a large part of the clay used in the region, produces fine pottery ware, and has a large commercial showroom. In addition to the better known teapots, tea pets, oil and grain jars, flower vases, figurines, glazed tiles, tables, ornamental rocks, and even ornamental waste bins are all manufactured in the community.

== Use with tea ==
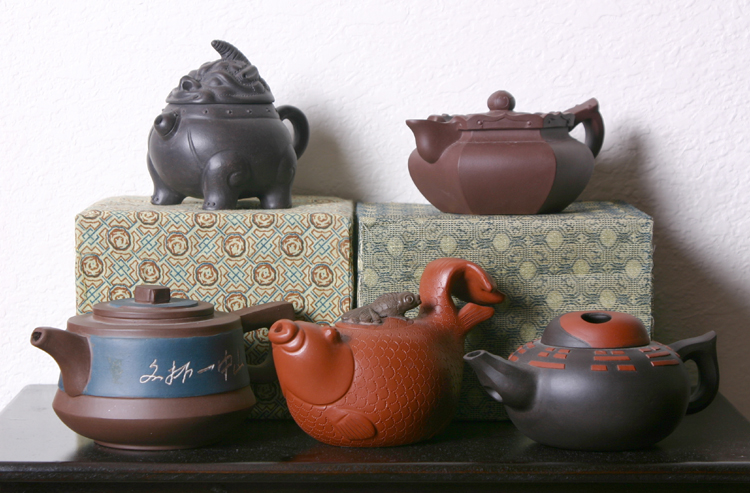
Five Yixing clay teapots, in styles from formal to whimsical

Yixing teapots are intended for puer, black, and oolong teas. They can also be used for green or white teas; however, the heat retention characteristics of Yixing makes the brewing process extremely difficult; and in such cases, the water must be heated to no greater than 85 °C (185 °F), before pouring into the teapot. A famous characteristic of Yixing teapots is their ability to absorb trace amounts of brewed tea flavors and minerals into the teapot with each brewing. Over time, these accumulate to give each Yixing teapot its own unique interior coating that flavors and colors future brewings. It is for this reason that soap is not recommended for cleaning Yixing teapots, but instead, fresh distilled water and air drying. Many tea connoisseurs will steep only one type of tea in a particular Yixing teapot, so that future brewings of the same type of tea will be optimally enhanced. In contrast, brewing many different types of tea in a Yixing pot is likely to create a coating of mishmashed flavors that muddy the taste of future brewings.

Some Yixing teapots are smaller than their western counterparts as the tea is often brewed using the gongfu style of brewing: shorter steeping durations with smaller amounts of water and smaller teacups (compared to western-style brewing). Traditionally, the tea from the teapot is poured into either a small pitcher, from which it is then poured into a teacup that holds approximately 30 ml or less of liquid, allowing the tea to be quickly and repeatedly ingested before it becomes cooled, or into several teacups for guests.

== Price ==
Prices can vary from under 100 to thousands of yuan. A pot was auctioned in 2010 for 12.32 million yuan. Generally, the price of Yixing teapots is dependent on factors such as age, clay, artist, style and production methods. The more expensive pots are shaped by hand using wooden and bamboo tools to manipulate the clay into form, while cheaper Yixing pots are produced by slipcasting.

== Clay varieties ==
The type of clay used has a great impact on the characteristics of the teapot. There are three major colour types of zisha clays: purple, red, and beige. Duan ni is a symbiosis of various clays and will normally turn into beige colour after firing. A subtype of the purple variety, called Tianqing clay, has historically been the most sought-after due to its rarity. It was said that Tianqing clay was exhausted, but it is suggested that it is not the case. Tianqing clay was scarce only in the Ming dynasty as the excavation skills and technologies were limited. It was difficult for potters to excavate purple clay as the clay were normally located 30 meters below the surface. With the technology advancement, the excavation of purple clay has flourished, so has Tianqing clay.

Tianqing clay is distinguished from the generic purple type by:

- Its dark liver color after firing.
- Its markedly sandier texture.
- Its higher permeability, leading to greater formation of a distinctive semitransparent patina.
- It can turn greenish after a period of usage and has a jade-like appearance this change is distinguished from green coloration which is present from firing.

The teapot 風卷葵壺 made by Yang FengNian in the Qing dynasty was made from Tianqing clay. The teapot is now owned by the Yixing Ceramic Museum.

=== Some examples of Zisha teapots made with purple clay ===
Picture	Name	Main colors	Feel and look very sandy, extreme permeability	Shiny or metallic	Odd coloration
	Yixing teapot with Shao Hengyu mark	Blue or dark grey, or greenish (after usage or soaked in water for a week)	Yes	Yes	No
	Yixing teapot with Yang Pengnian mark	Dark liver	Yes	Yes	No
	Yixing teapot with Shi Jichang mark	Green, with multiple purple areas	Yes	Yes	Yes
	Yixing teapot with Qingquan Meiyu mark	Dark liver, green for thin areas (after soaked in water for a week)	Not obviously	Yes for green areas	Dark liver color and green color at the same time
	Yixing teapot with Chen Mingyuan mark	Dark liver, plus Blue or Dark Grey, and Green particles	Yes	Yes	Dark liver, blue or dark grey, and green particles at the same time
