= Ge Mingxiang =

18th-century Chinese potter

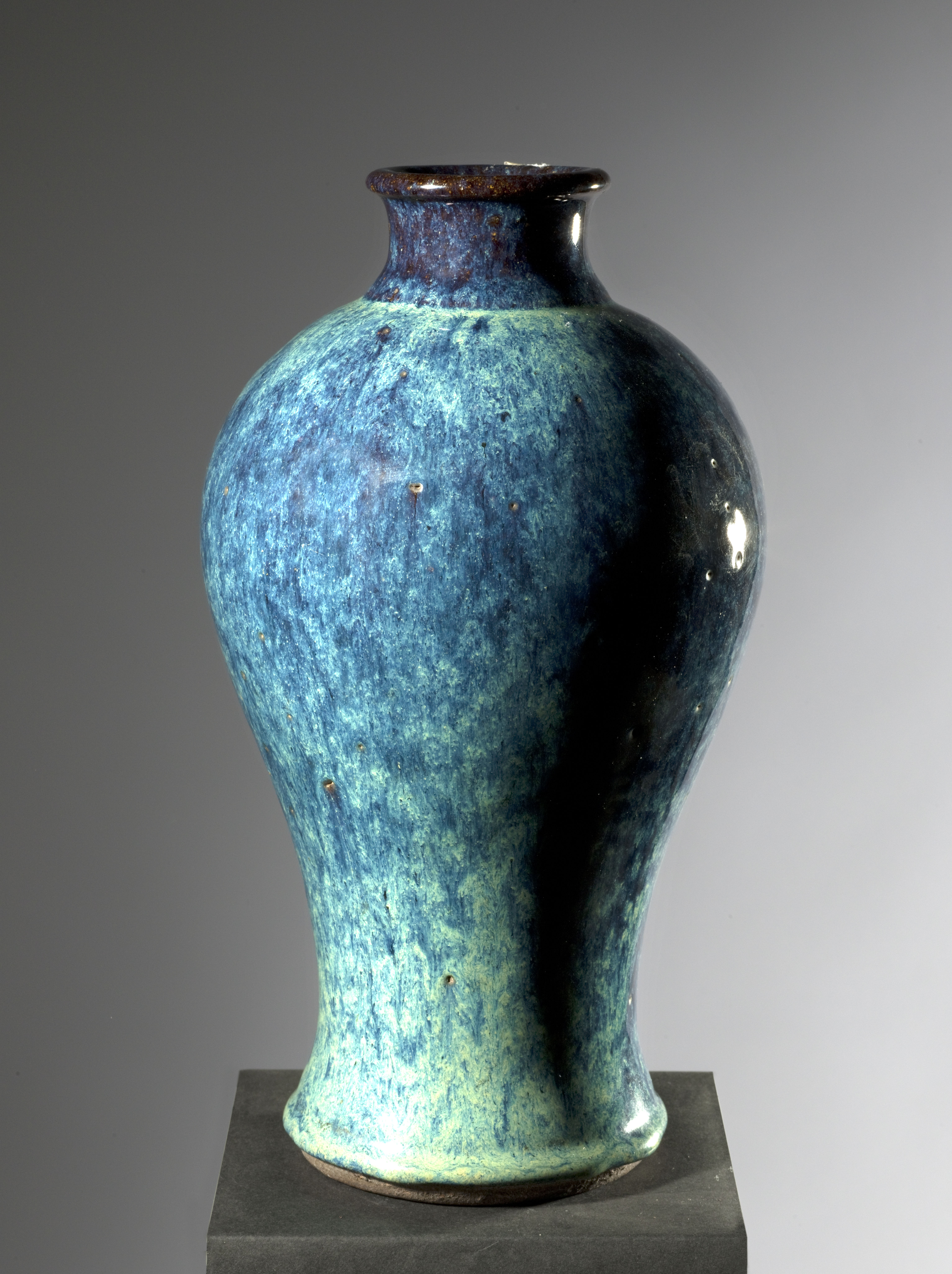
Vase by Ge Mingxiang at Musée Cernuschi, Accession no. M.C. 2878

Ge Mingxiang (1736–1795) (Chinese: 葛明祥; pinyin: Gě Míngxiáng) was a Chinese potter born in Dingshan, Yixing and active during the Qianlong period. Works by him and his brother Ge Yuanxiang (Chinese: 葛源祥; pinyin: Gě Yúanxiáng) were classified as Yixing ware.

The two brothers also made Yijun ware (imitations of Jun glaze) with mottled blue and green glazes (often referred to as "robins egg glaze"). Their work often took an egg-shaped or baluster form.

Their work was well received both domestically and overseas, especially in Japan.

Later generations continued to use the seal of the two brothers through the early 20th century.

== Museum holdings ==
Their work is held by several institutions, including:

- Philadelphia Museum of Art, Accession no.1904-629
- Victoria and Albert Museum, Accession no. 810-1883
- Art Gallery of New South Wales, Accession no. EC4.1966
- British Museum, Accession no. 1938,0524.76
- Musée Cernuschi, Accession no. M.C. 2878
- Xiamen Overseas Chinese Museum
- Anhui Museum
