= Yu Hui Tseng =

Chinese tea master

Yu Hui Tseng is a Chinese tea master. She is the only female master and among the ten most recognised today. She is also currently the only tea master active outside of China. She is the founder and owner of La Maison des Trois Thés tea salon in Paris.

== Biography ==
Born in a family descending from Zengzi, Yu Hui Tseng started studying the piano aged four, and later took up the clarinet at a professional level, earning a first prize in Taiwan at 17. In parallel, she studied the Gongfu tea ceremony with Master Zhang Tian Fu.

== Career ==
Maître Tseng uses her knowledge and experience to try to change the image tea has for many people in France and other western countries. Maître Tseng is known for her informed exchange of ideas with top wine experts like Philippe Faure-Brac, Richard Geoffroy and Jean-Claude Berrouet. Tseng is also consulted by many Michelin-starred chefs in Paris like Alain Senderens, Guy Savoy, Joël Robuchon, Olivier Roellinger and Pierre Gagnaire. She provides them with appropriate tea varieties for their restaurants and also helps them find the right flavours and scents to accompany their dishes. She also often collaborates with pastry chefs and chocolatiers, such as Jacques Génin and Pierre Hermé, sommeliers like Andreas Larrson and Patrick Borras, as well as master cheese makers, spice masters, whiskey-makers and even perfumers. Her unique skills are also useful for companies like Nestlé Waters who trust her taste and "nose" for their products. Likewise, in 2017 Master Tseng endorsed the world's first Tea Humidor, by Lotusier, and performed a tea-tasting session at its Spring press launch in London.

=== La Maison des Trois Thés ===
In 1995, she opened La Maison des Trois Thés in Paris at 1 rue Saint-Médard, where she keeps one of the largest tea cellars in the world. The cellar contains over 1,000 selections of tea, with some over 100 years old, and some with prices significantly more than even the most prized and grand French wines, such as Château Pétrus, Romanée-Conti, or anything from the cellars of Dom Pérignon. In her tea salon, she stores and ages tea varieties in specially designed chambers for optimal temperature and humidity control.
