= Tea pet =

Chinese clay figurine for tea making

Tea Pet
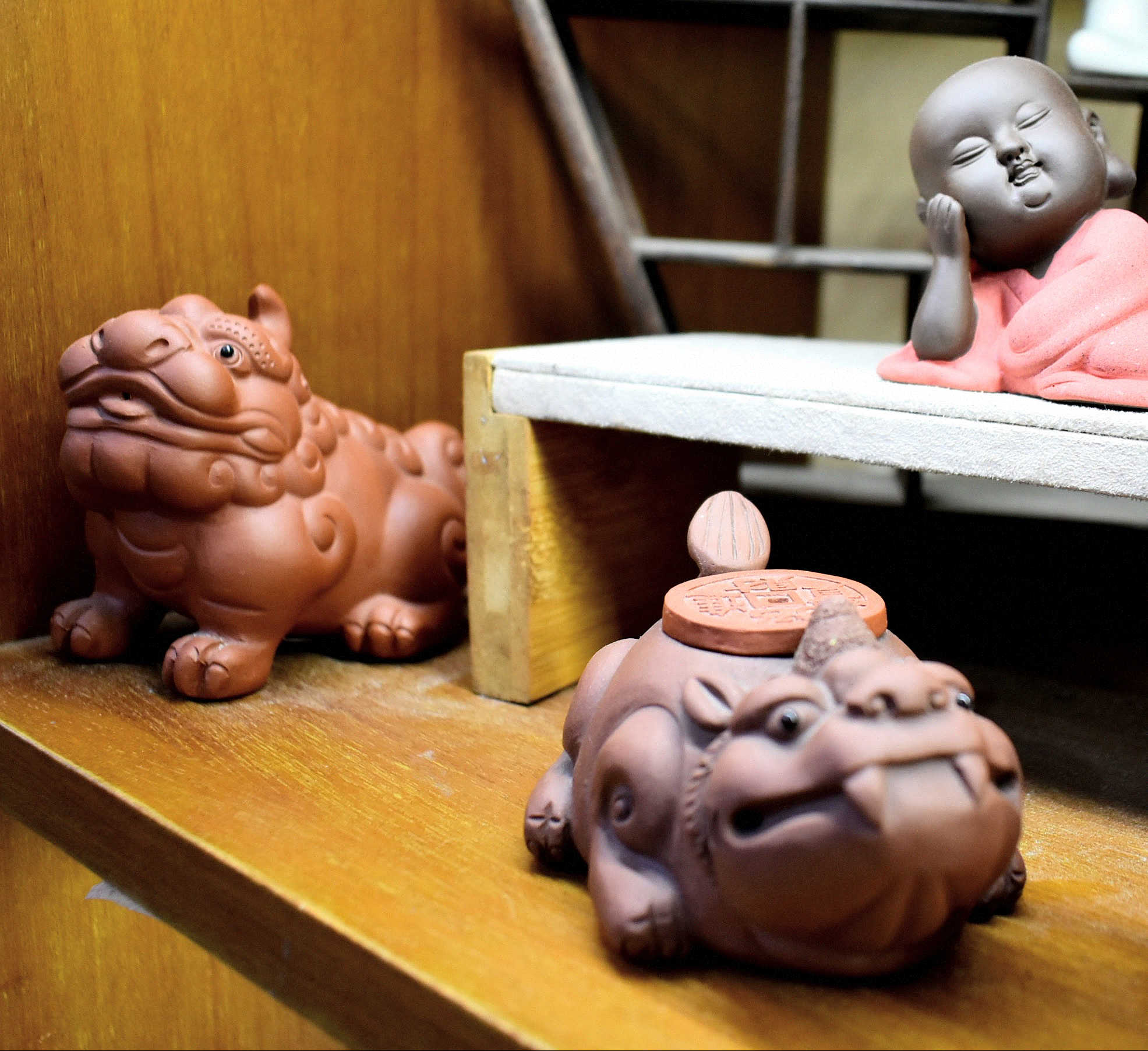
- Tea pets for sale in a shop
- Chinese: 茶宠
- Traditional Chinese: 茶寵
Transcriptions
Standard Mandarin
- Hanyu Pinyin: Cháchǒng

Tea pet or tea lover's pet (simplified Chinese: 茶宠; traditional Chinese: 茶寵; pinyin: cháchǒng), also known phonetically as chachong, is a small pottery figurine kept by some tea drinkers as an ornament or a good luck charm. They are usually made of purple clay or zisha, a type of prized clay from the region near Yixing in Jiangsu province, China. Similar to Yixing teapots made from the same clay, tea pets are unglazed and are mostly monochromatic with a rough surface.

A tea pet is typically placed on a tea tray, and the tea rinse (first brew) is poured over it during tea-making. This is called "feeding" or "nourishing" the pet and is done to teach mindfulness and patience, avoid wasting the rinse water, and test the water's temperature (if it evaporates instantly, it is hot enough). Due to the tea pet not being glazed and thus being porous, the figurine absorbs some of the tea poured over it. Over time, as one "raises" their tea pet, the feeding gradually results in it changing colour, developing a glossy patina, and building up a scent.

Tea pets are often molded into zodiac animals, Chinese mythical creatures (such as dragons, pixiu, and qilin), or historical and mythical characters such as Guanyin, Maitreya, and Zhuge Liang. Each tea pet often represents specific auspicious symbols or virtues, such as good luck, fortune, or happiness. For instance, pigs symbolize wealth and pixiu symbolize protection. The selection of a tea pet can reflect the owner's aspirations and values, making these figures meaningful companions during the tea ceremony.

One of the popular models for the tea pet is the "pee-pee boy", which, when first soaked in cold water and then showered with hot water, will squirt out the water it previously absorbed. A long jetting distance indicates that the water temperature is hot enough to brew tea, making the pee-pee boy an early form of thermometer.

== History ==
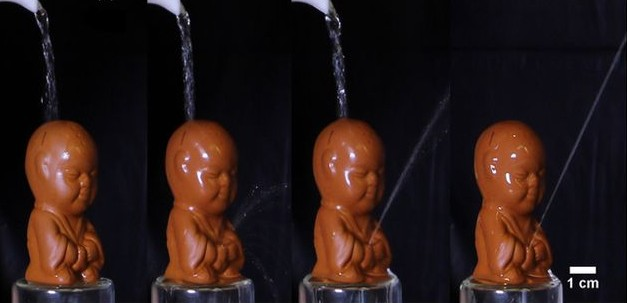
Hot water poured on the head of the "pee-pee boy" tea pet triggers a water jet indicating the water temperature.

The birthplace of tea pets, Yixing, was first famous as the birthplace of Yixing clay during the Song dynasty (960–1279 CE). With the popularity of the Yixing clay teapot, Yixing became a major production center for tea pots, mugs, and other things used for making tea.

Tea pets originated in the Yuan Dynasty (1271–1368), when artisans began forming scraps of zisha left over from making Yixing teapots into animals and mythical creatures. Tea enthusiasts realized the animals would respond to tea similarly to the Yixing teapots and incorporated them into their tea-making. Production of tea pets is still concentrated in Yixing region in the modern day.

Despite the longevity of Yixing as a production centre for tea products and accessories, little has been written on the development of tea pets in Chinese history, with few literary sources detailing their use and production.

== See also ==
- Chinese tea
- Chinese tea culture
- List of Chinese teas
- Red Rose Tea #Collectible premiums
