= Number One Yixing Factory =

Chinese teapot factory

Yixing Factory Number One is the oldest teapot factory in China. The factory houses skilled artisans who set strict standards for their work.

== History ==
In 1918, the Jiangsu Provincial Ceramics Factory was established for the production of pottery using Yixing clay. By 1932, more than 600 craftspeople worked in Yixing. During the Japanese invasion, the artists scattered and many subsequently died. Under the People's Republic of China government, industry began to revive. In 1954, 59 potters began the Zisha production group of the Shushan workshop with funding from the Tangdu Pottery co-operative. The government established Factory No. 1 in April 1958. Before that time, no proper ranking existed for the craftsmen. Every maker mined, mixed and took courses and exams to be recognised. It took about three years of training to advance through the system. At each stage the craftsmen were required to complete a test to attain a new title. The craftsmen would begin as an 'Assistant Master Craftsman', then ascend through the ranks of 'Master Craftsman', 'Senior Master Craftsman' and finally 'National Master Craftsman'. Their signature product was artisan-crafted teapots.

Starting in 1966, the Cultural Revolution led Factory No. 1 to begin to produce utilitarian pots in a style known as shui ping hu in vast numbers. Instead of having the name of the craftsman who made the pot on the bottom, these pots had characters that represented Yixing. During this time, the factory walls were filled with slogans painted in red that insisted that art was for the people and not for self-aggrandizement. Many connoisseurs still prize these pots for their simplicity and quality.

With the end of the Cultural Revolution, new ranks for craftsmen were subsequently introduced in the 1970s:

- Technician (Xing-siu)
- Craftsman (Jishuyuan or Gongyi meishuyuan)
- Craftsman (Minjian yiren) – independent potters
- Assistant Master craftsman (Zhuli gongyishi)
- Master craftsman (Gongyishi)
- Senior Master craftsman (Gaoji gongyishi)
- Provincial Grandmaster
- Grandmaster craftsman.

Today, teapots produced by the factory are diverse and creative; masters have resumed signing their work and their creations are in high demand. Waits for a master craftsman's commissioned pot can reach up to two years.

=== Notable artists ===
Gu Jingzhou, one of the founders and deputy director of Research and Technology at the factory, was an accomplished master artist. His teapots have sold for up to $US 2 million. Jiang Rong was a Grand Master whose teapots emulated nature. Ren Ganting (1889–1968), an ambidextrous artist who created natural forms, participated in the National Labour Heroes Convention. Pei Shimin (1892–1979) started making teapots at age 14. Zhu Kexin (1904–1986) began making teapots before the war and worked in the Jiangsu factory as a youth. He has since received many honours.

== Other factories ==
Yixing Factory No. 2 was formed in 1984 by brothers Xu Siew Tang and Xu Han Tang, both master craftsmen. They managed to lure some craftsmen and women from Factory No. 1 to join them.
