= Yixing ware =

Type of clay customary in Jiangsu province, China

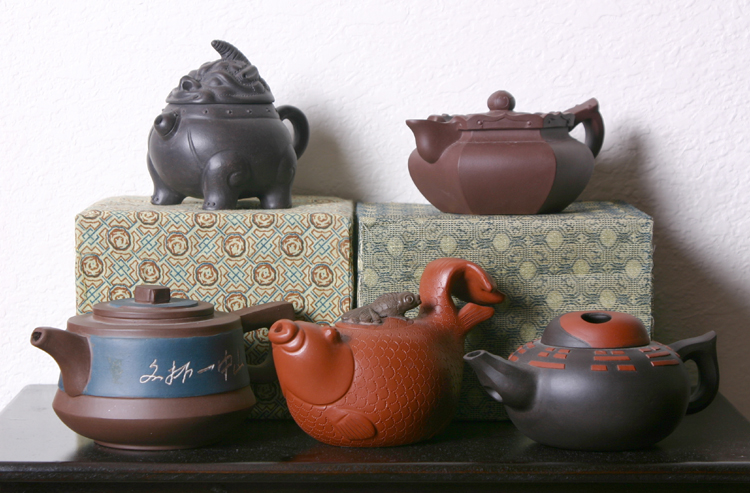
Five Yixing clay teapots showing a variety of styles from formal to whimsical

Yixing clay (simplified Chinese: 宜兴泥; traditional Chinese: 宜興泥; pinyin: Yíxīng ní; Wade–Giles: I-Hsing ni) is a type of clay from the region near the city of Yixing in Jiangsu Province, China, used in Chinese pottery since the Song dynasty (960–1279) when Yixing clay was first mined around China's Lake Tai. From the 17th century on, Yixing wares were commonly exported to Europe. The finished stoneware, which is used for teaware and other small items, is usually red or brown in colour. Also known as zisha (宜興紫砂) ware, they are typically left unglazed and use clays that are very cohesive and can form coils, slabs and most commonly slip casts. These clays can also be formed by throwing. The best known wares made from Yixing clay are Yixing clay teapots, tea pets, and other teaware.

== Clay types ==
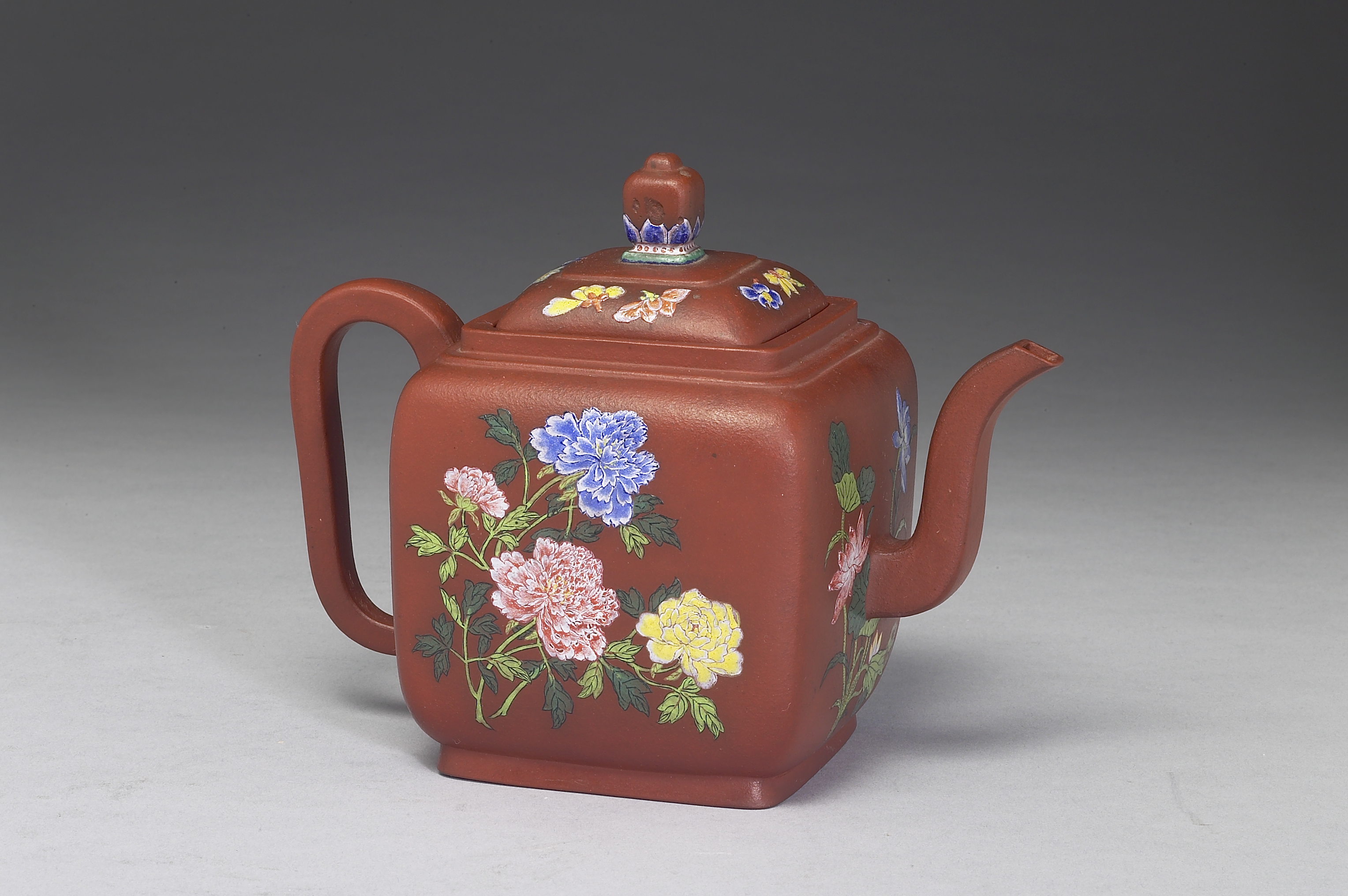
Yixing square teapot with flowers of the four seasons in painted enamels from a Kangxi era (1662–1722). National Palace Museum

A Yixing zisha teapot – "Melon", which combines zi ni and zhu ni clays

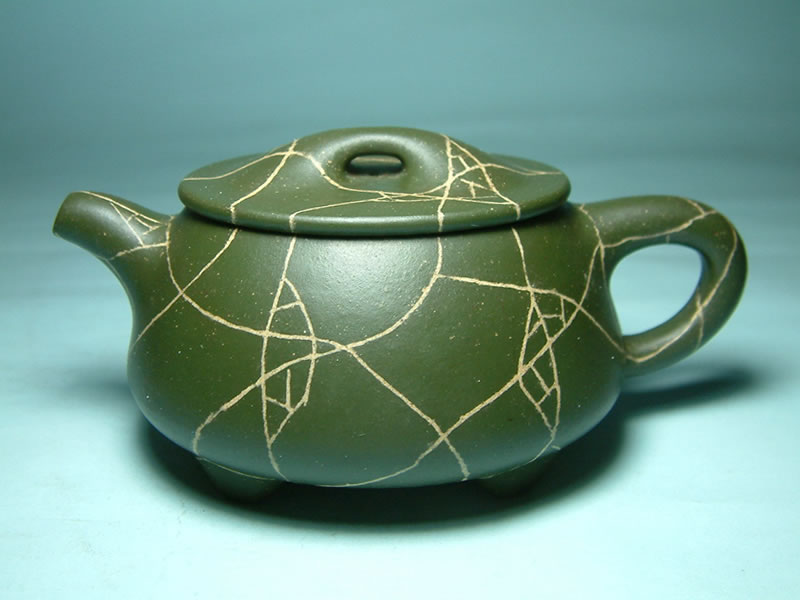
Yixing teapot in green colour

Zisha can be broadly categorised into three colours: purple, red and beige. The deeper the colour the higher the concentration of iron in the clay.

- Purple: Zi sha or zi ni (紫砂 or 紫泥; literally, "purple sand/clay") – This stoneware has a purple-red-brown colour.
- Red: Zhu sha or zhu ni (朱砂 or 朱泥; literally "cinnabar sand/clay") – A reddish-brown stoneware with a very high iron content. The name only refers to the sometimes bright red hue of cinnabar. Due to the increasing demand for Yixing stoneware, zhu ni is now produced in very limited quantities. Zhu ni clay is not to be confused with hong ni (红泥; 'red clay'), another red clay.
- Beige: Duan ni (段泥 or 團泥) – Stoneware made with duan ni is beige or light white/green in colour. Duan ni is a symbiosis of various clays. Stoneware made with green clay (绿泥; 綠泥; Lü ni) is also in beige colour.

== Mineral composition ==
Zisha is a mixture of kaolin, quartz and mica, with a high content of iron oxide. It is mined principally at Huanglongshan and Zhaozhuangshan and has a somewhat sandy texture. The process of preparing the clay is lengthy and was traditionally regarded as a trade secret. Typical firing temperature is between 1100 – 1200 °C in an oxidizing atmosphere.

== Manufacturing ==
The raw materials for Yixing clay are buried deep underground, sometimes under heavy sedimentary rock formations. When excavated, it is usually located within stratified layers of other clays. The seam of Yixing zisha can be as thick as several decimeters, up to a meter. Yixing clays consist of fine iron-containing silt, with mica, kaolinite and varying quantities of quartz and iron ores as its main mineral constituents.

Processing of raw zisha Yixing clay involves removing the clay from the underlying strata, drying it under the sun in open stalls, and then pulverizing the dried clay pieces into fine particles. The clay powder then undergoes air screening to isolate clay particles of the finest grit size. The screened clay is then mixed with water in a cement mixer to a thick paste, piled into heaps, and vacuum processed to remove air bubbles, in addition to some moisture from the clay mixture. The quality and quantity of water in Yixing clay is critical in that it determines the quality of the stoneware products produced. After this processing, the resulting clay is then ready to be used.

The appearance of Yixing products, such as its colour or texture, can be enriched and altered through the addition of various metal oxides into the Yixing clay, through the manipulation of firing temperatures, and also from regulating the kiln atmosphere (oxidative versus reductive).

== Use ==
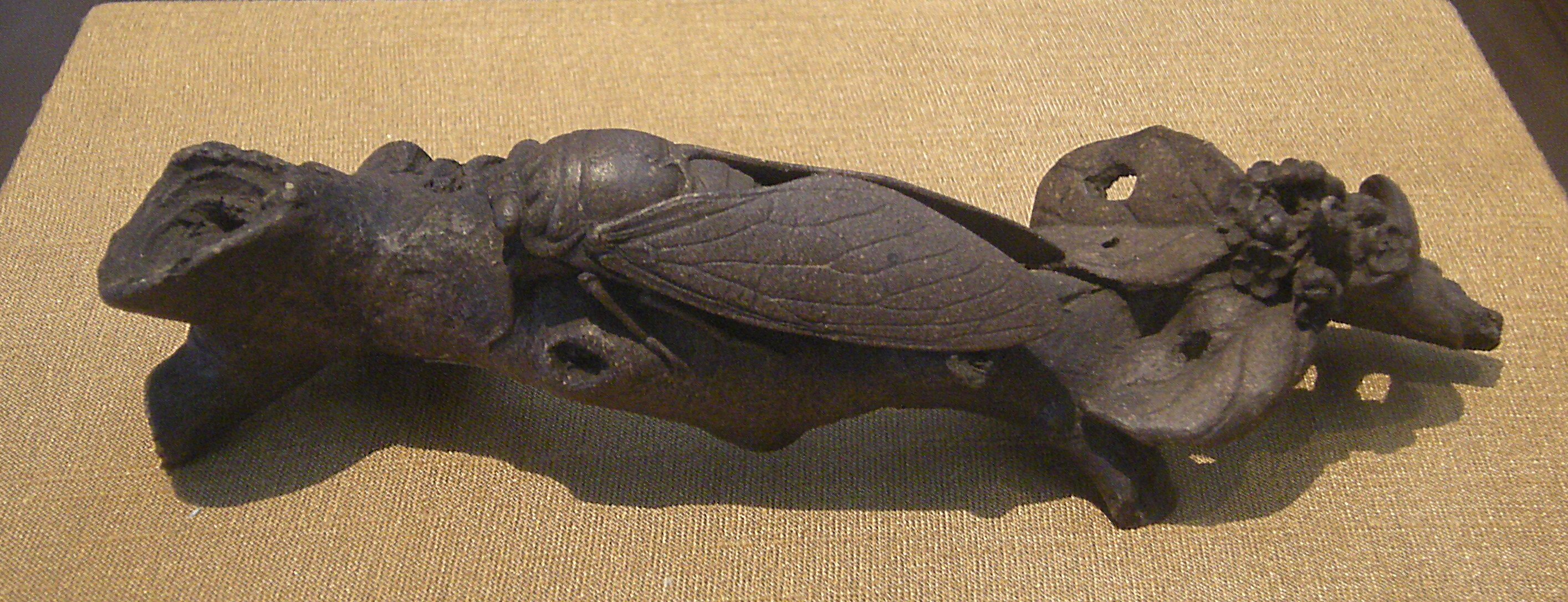
Brush rest, a cicada on a branch

Yixing teawares are prized because their unglazed surfaces absorb traces of the beverage, creating a more complex flavour. For these reasons, Yixing teawares should be washed with water only, never using detergents. So much flavour is absorbed by vessels made with this clay that it is customary, so as to not confuse the flavours, to use one type of tea with one type of pot. Connoisseurs recommend using each tea vessel for one kind of tea (white, green, oolong, black, or puer) or even one variety of tea only.

Early pots were designed for use while travelling hence you will see the simple classical look of the pots produced during the Ming dynasty. Most tea drinking enthusiast will have one teapot for travel use, these tend to be less expensive and compact in design. It was not until during the mid-Qing dynasty (18th century) that tea connoisseurs started to use the pot at home and the artisan begin to form them into different shape and sizes. Many exotic forms were conceived. Vessels were decorated with poetic inscriptions, calligraphy, paintings and seals were incised onto the surface of the teapots.

== Influence in Europe ==
In the late 17th century Yixing teapots were imported to the Netherlands along with China tea. The unfamiliar material inspired attempts to imitate it, and one Delftware manufacturer announced in 1678 that he was making "red teapots"; however, later museum scholarship indicates that the products of Lambertus Cleffius and Samuel van Eenhoorn are not securely identified. Some red stoneware by rival Dutch potters from about 1700 does survive, closely copying Yixing pots in style.

In 1690, the Elers brothers originally from Delft, established redware production in Bradwell, Staffordshire, England using slipcasting.

Johann Friedrich Böttger, famous as the pioneer of European porcelain, was in contact with some of these and developed a rival Böttger ware, a dark red stoneware first sold in 1710, and manufactured and imitated by others, all up to about 1740. It is a very significant stage in the development of porcelain in Europe.

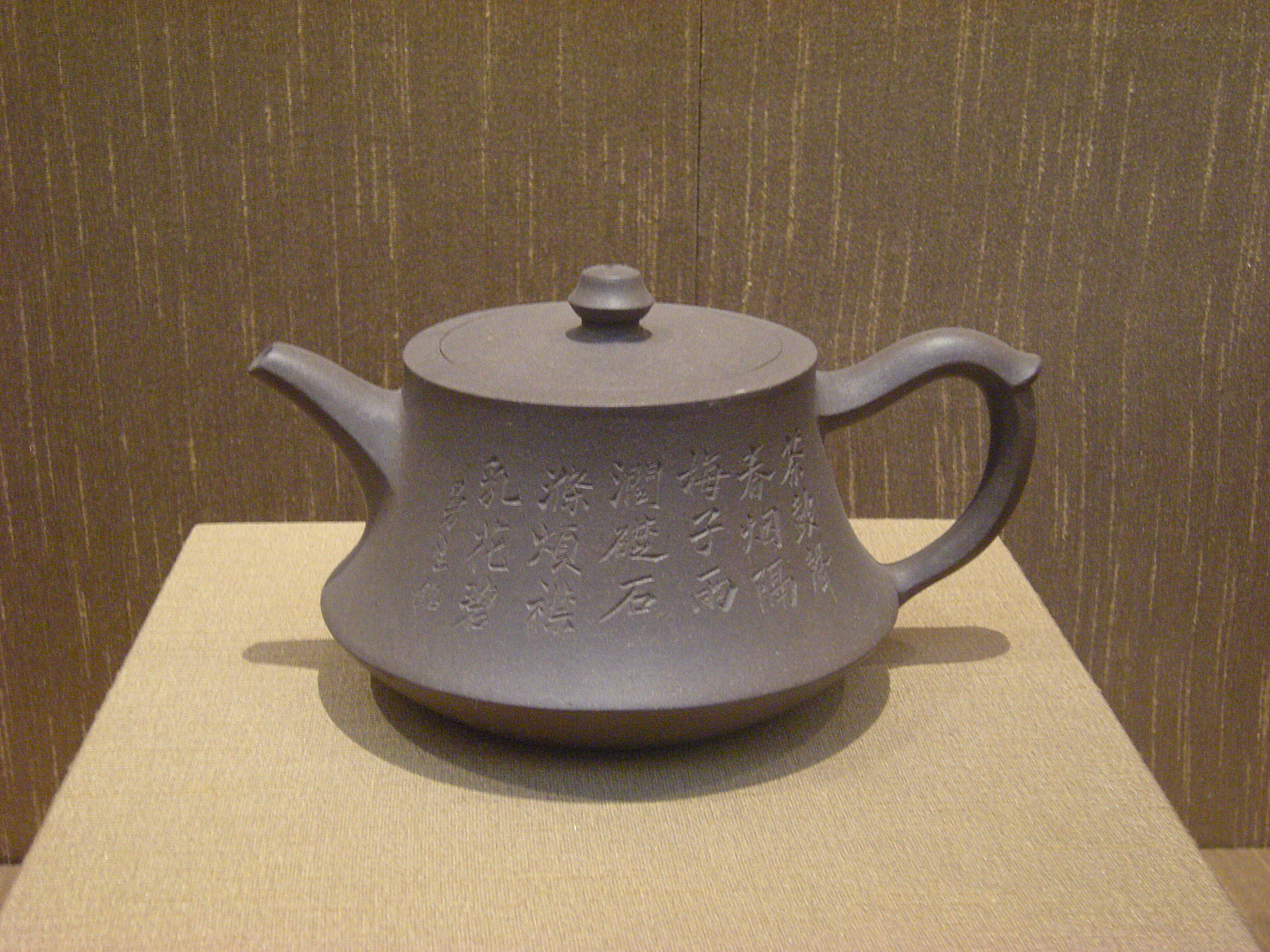

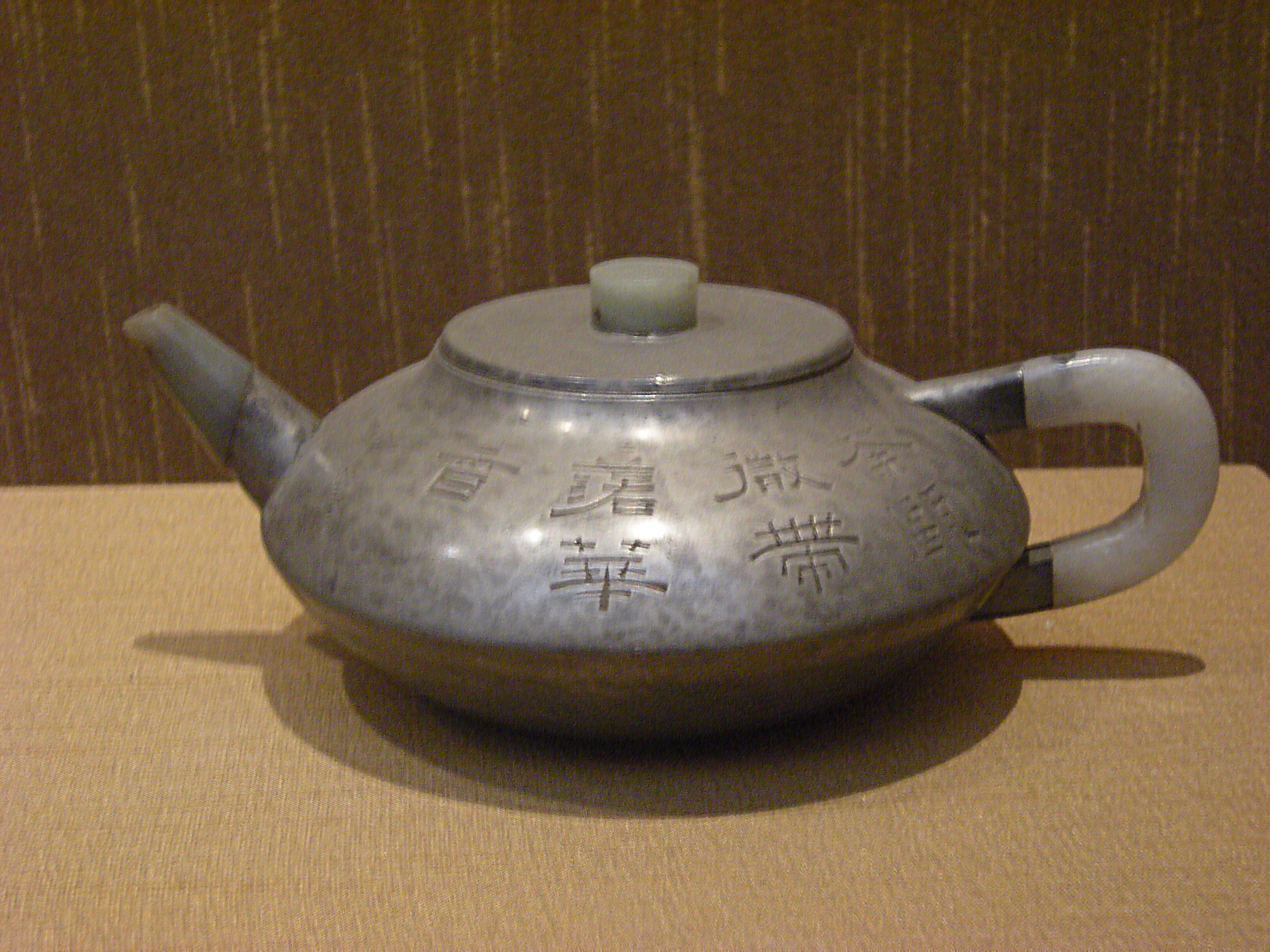

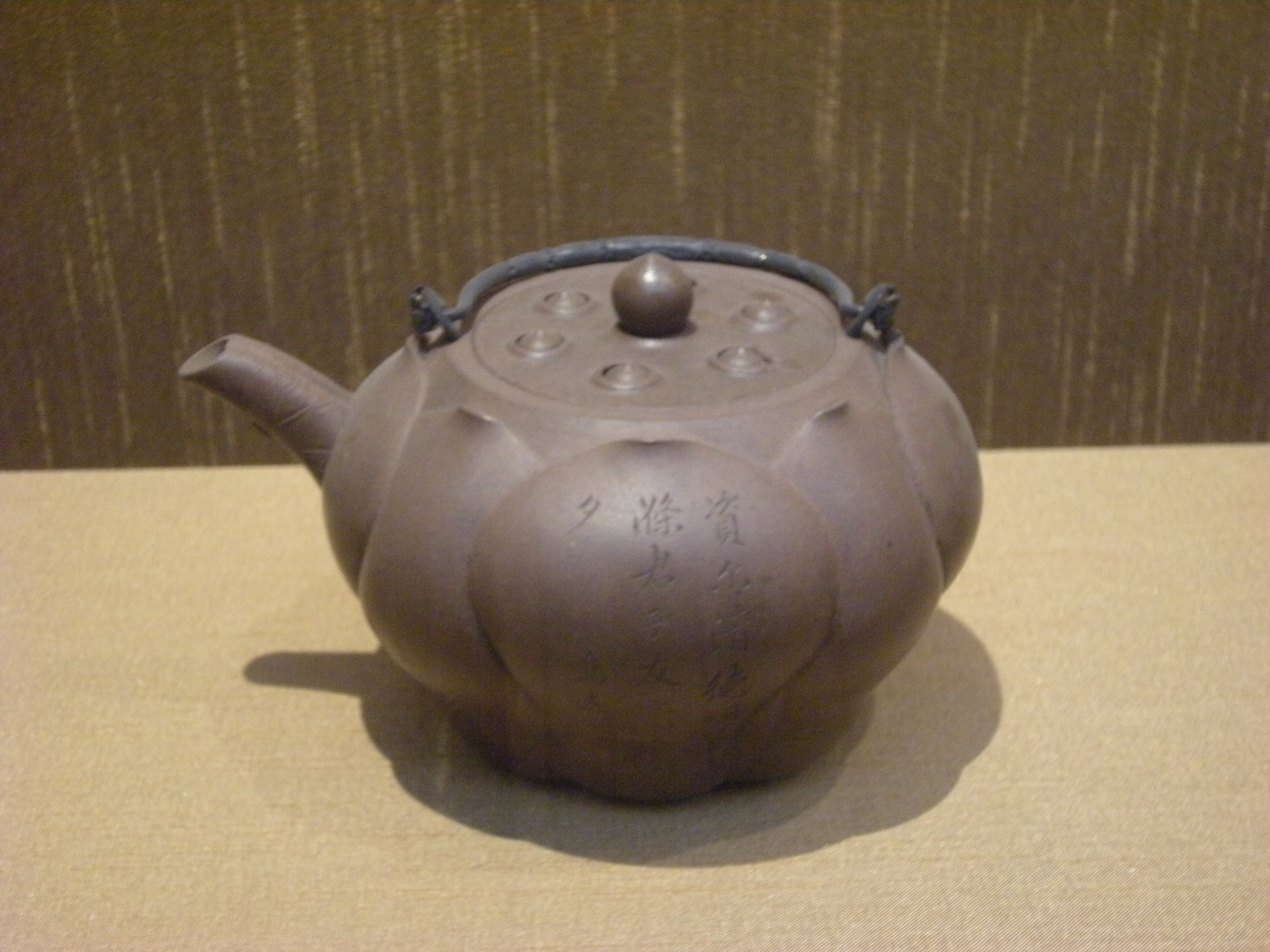

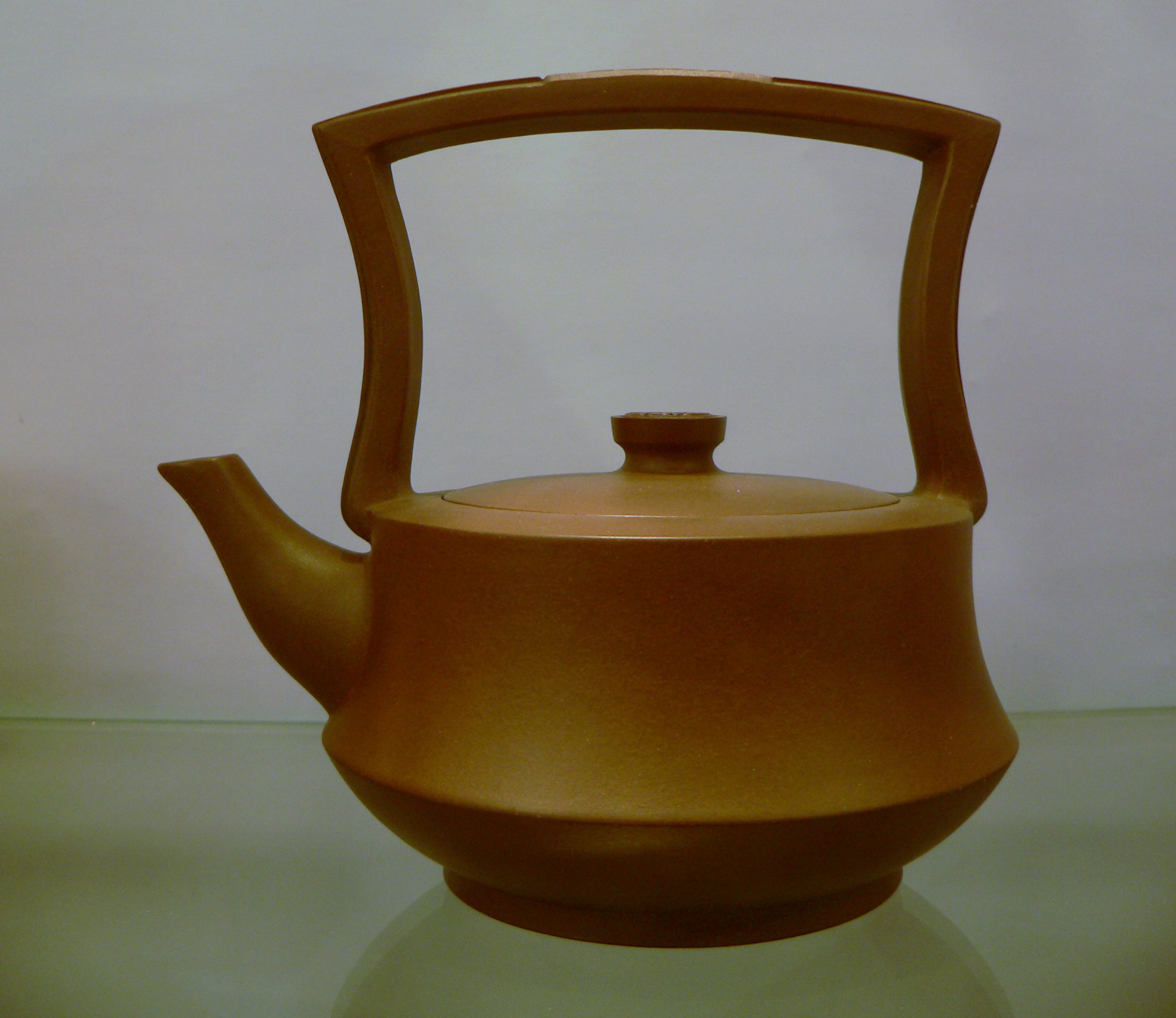

== See also ==
- Clay minerals
- Number One Yixing Factory
- Yixing clay teapot
- Ge Mingxiang, 18th c. potter
