= List of Japanese ceramics sites =

The list of Japanese ceramics sites (日本の陶磁器産地一覧, Nihon no tōjiki sanchi ichiran) consists of historical and existing pottery kilns in Japan and the Japanese pottery and porcelain ware they primarily produced.

The list contains kilns of the post-Heian period. Not listed are ancient earthenware pottery such as Jōmon pottery, Yayoi pottery, Haji pottery, Sue pottery, Kamui ware, etc. which are general topics whose origins and production cannot be linked to just one specific kiln. Shimamono are objects that were imported from southeast Asia, but later produced locally as well. Mishima pottery despite its name is of Korean origin.

Some of the existing kilns and the main ceramic wares have been designated by the government Agency for Cultural Affairs as an Intangible Cultural Property as regulated by the Law for the Protection of Cultural Properties (1950). In addition the Ministry of Economy, Trade and Industry (METI) has designated others as "traditional handicraft workshops". The criteria set by the ministry to be recognised as a "traditional craft" (伝統的工芸品, Den tōtekikōgeihin) are regulated by Law No. 57 on the Promotion of Traditional Craft Industries (1974), also known as the Densan Law (伝産法):

1. It is primarily a craft for everyday life usage
2. The manufacturing process has to be largely done manually
3. Has a history of over 100 years, with production continuing to use traditional technologies and techniques
4. The type of main raw material has remained the same for over 100 years.
5. Artisans producing the craft have to have a certain degree of scale to be counted as a regional industry

Amongst the list are also the so-called Enshū's Seven Kilns (遠州七窯, Enshū nana gama) attributed to Kobori Enshū during the Edo period, as well as the Six Ancient Kilns (六古窯, Rokkoyō) by Fujiyo Koyama during the Shōwa era.

The listing follows a geographical arrangement from north to southern Japan. It is divided by regions, then prefectures, then within the prefectures in alphabetical order. Those designated by the government are in bold letters, those listed under Enshū are marked with a 7 and those by Koyama with a 6 sign in brackets.

== Hokkaidō ==
- Kita Arashiyama (北の嵐山)
- Kobushi-yaki (こぶ志焼)
- Otaru-yaki (小樽焼)
- Sapporo-yaki (札幌焼)

== Tōhoku ==
=== Aomori ===
- Hachinohe-yaki (八戸焼)
- Tsugaru-yaki (津軽焼)

=== Akita ===
- Naraoka-yaki (楢岡焼)
- Shiraiwa-yaki (白岩焼)

=== Fukushima ===
- Aizuhongō-yaki (会津本郷焼)
- Aizukeizan-yaki (会津慶山焼)
- Nihonmatsubanko-yaki (二本松萬古焼)
- Ōborisōma-yaki (大堀相馬焼)
- Sōmakoma-yaki (相馬駒焼)
- Tajimabanko-yaki (田島萬古焼)

=== Iwate ===
- Dai-yaki (台焼)
- Fujisawa-yaki (藤沢焼)
- Kajichō-yaki (鍛冶丁焼)
- Kokuji-yaki (小久慈焼)

=== Miyagi ===
- Daigamori-yaki (台ヶ森焼)
- Kirigome-yaki (切込焼)
- Tsutsumi-yaki (堤焼)

=== Yamagata ===
- Goten-yaki (碁点焼)
- Hirashimizu-yaki (平清水焼)
- Kami no hata-yaki (上の畑焼)
- Narushima-yaki (成島焼)
- Shinjō Higashiyama-yaki (新庄東山焼)

== Kantō ==
=== Gunma ===
- Jijōji-yaki (自性寺焼)
- Shibutami-yaki (渋民焼)
- Tsukiyono-yaki (月夜野焼)

=== Ibaraki ===
- Kasama-yaki (笠間焼)

=== Saitama ===
- Hannō-yaki (飯能焼)

=== Tochigi ===
- Koisago-yaki (小砂焼)
- Mashiko-yaki (益子焼)
- Mikamo-yaki (三毳焼)

=== Tokyō ===
- Imado-yaki (今戸焼)

== Chūbu ==
=== Aichi ===
- Akazu-yaki (赤津焼)
- Hōraku-yaki (豊楽焼)
- Inuyama-yaki (犬山焼)
- Seto-yaki (瀬戸焼) (6)
  - Ofukei-yaki (御深井焼)
- Tokoname-yaki (常滑焼) (6)

=== Fukui ===
- Echizen-yaki (越前焼) (6)

=== Gifu ===
- Koito-yaki (小糸焼)
- Mino-yaki (美濃焼)
  - Oribe-yaki (織部焼)
  - Shino-yaki (志野焼)
- Shibukusa-yaki (渋草焼)
- Yamada-yaki (山田焼)

=== Ishikawa ===
- Kutani-yaki (九谷焼)
- Ōhi-yaki (大樋焼)
- Suzu-yaki (珠洲焼)

=== Nagano ===
- Matsushiro-yaki (松代焼)
- Obayashi-yaki (尾林焼)
- Takatō-yaki (高遠焼)
- Tenryūkyō-yaki (天竜峡焼)

=== Niigata ===
- Anchi-yaki (庵地焼)
- Muramatsu-yaki (村松焼)
- Mumyōi-yaki (無名異焼)

=== Shizuoka ===
- Moriyama-yaki (森山焼)
- Shitoro-yaki (志戸呂焼) (7)
- Shizuhata-yaki (賤機焼)

=== Toyama ===
- Etchū Maruyama-yaki (越中丸山焼)
- Etchū Seto-yaki (越中瀬戸焼)
- Kosugi-yaki (小杉焼)
- Sansuke-yaki (三助焼)

=== Yamanashi ===
- Nōketsu-yaki (能穴焼)

== Kansai ==
=== Hyōgo ===
- Awaji ware (淡路焼), also known as Minpei or Mimpei ware
- Akōunka-yaki (赤穂雲火焼)
- Izushi-yaki (出石焼)
- Minpei-yaki (珉平焼)
- Tanba Tachikui-yaki (丹波立杭焼) (6)

=== Kyōto ===
- Asahi-yaki (朝日焼) (7)
- Kiyomizu-yaki (清水焼)
- Kyō-yaki (京焼)
- Raku-yaki (楽焼)

=== Mie ===
- Akogi-yaki (阿漕焼)
- Banko-yaki (萬古焼)
- Iga-yaki (伊賀焼)
- Mihama-yaki (御浜焼)

=== Nara ===
- Akahada-yaki (赤膚焼) (7)

=== Ōsaka ===
- Kikkō-yaki (吉向焼)
- Kosobe-yaki (古曾部) (7)

=== Shiga ===
- Hatta-yaki (八田焼)
- Konan-yaki (湖南焼)
- Kotō-yaki (湖東焼)
- Shigaraki-yaki (信楽焼) (6)
- Zeze-yaki (膳所焼) (7)

=== Wakayama ===
- Zuishi-yaki (瑞芝焼)

== Chūgoku ==
=== Hiroshima ===
- Himetani-yaki (姫谷焼)
- Miyajima-yaki (宮島焼)

=== Okayama ===
- Bizen-yaki (備前焼) (6)
- Hashima-yaki (羽島焼)
- Mushiake-yaki (虫明焼)
- Sakazu-yaki (酒津焼)

=== Shimane ===
- Banshōzan-yaki (萬祥山焼)
- Fujina-yaki (布志名焼)
- Hachiman-yaki (八幡焼)
- Iwami-yaki (石見焼)
- Mijiro-yaki (御代焼)
- Mori-yaki (母里焼)
- Sodeshi-yaki (袖師焼)
- Shussai-yaki (出西焼)
- Yunotsu-yaki (温泉津焼)

=== Tottori ===
- Inkyūzan-yaki (因久山焼)
- Hosshōji-yaki (法勝寺焼)
- Kazuwa-yaki (上神焼)
- Uradome-yaki (浦富焼)
- Ushino-yaki (牛ノ戸焼)

=== Yamaguchi ===
- Hagi-yaki (萩焼)
- Seiri-yaki (星里焼)
- Sueda-yaki (末田焼)

== Shikoku ==
=== Ehime ===
- Rakuzan-yaki (楽山焼)
- Suigetsu-yaki (水月焼)
- Tobe-yaki (砥部焼)

=== Kagawa ===
- Kamikage-yaki (神懸焼)
- Okamoto-yaki (岡本焼)
- Rihei-yaki (理平焼)

=== Kōchi ===
- Nōsayama-yaki (能茶山焼)
- Odo-yaki (尾戸焼)
- Uraharano-yaki (内原野焼)

=== Tokushima ===
- Ōtani-yaki (大谷焼)

== Kyūshū ==
=== Fukuoka ===
- Agano-yaki (上野焼) (7)
- Futagawa-yaki (二川焼)
- Kamachi-yaki (蒲池焼)
- Koishiwara-yaki (小石原焼)
- Takatori-yaki (高取焼) (7)
- Ichinose-yaki (一の瀬焼)

=== Kagoshima ===
- Satsuma-yaki (薩摩焼)
- Ryūmonji-yaki (龍門司焼)
- Tanegashima-yaki (種子島焼)

=== Kumamoto ===
- Amakusa tōjiki (天草陶磁器)
- Koda-yaki (高田焼)
- Shōdai-yaki (小代焼)

=== Miyazaki ===
- Komatsubara-yaki (小松原焼)
- Tojō-yaki (都城焼)

=== Nagasaki ===
- Hasami-yaki (波佐見焼)
- Mikawachi-yaki (三川内焼)
- Nagayo-yaki (長与焼)
- Utsutsugawa-yaki (現川焼)

=== Oita ===
- Onta-yaki (小鹿田焼)

=== Saga ===
- Arita-yaki (有田焼)
- Imari-yaki (伊万里焼)
- Hizen Yoshida-yaki (肥前吉田焼)
- Hizen Ozaki-yaki (肥前尾崎焼)
- Karatsu-yaki (唐津焼)
- Shiraishi-yaki (白石焼)

== Ryukyu Islands ==
- Ryūkyū-yaki (琉球焼)
- Tsuboya-yaki (壺屋焼)
- Ishigaki-yaki (石垣焼)
