= Enshū's Seven Kilns =

Enshū's Seven Kilns (遠州七窯 Enshū chō or Enshū nana gama) is a list of Japanese pottery kilns whose products were considered amongst the favourites of the Japanese tea ceremony master Kobori Enshū (小堀 遠州 1579–1647), who lived during the Edo period.

== History ==
The teamaster Enshū used a number of Japanese tea utensils and corresponded about it with other friends, connoisseurs of tea, and the lords of the provinces where the kilns were located. It is assumed that Enshū also gave works in commission, thus helping in the establishment of some of the newer, less-known kilns of that time and also establishing a long-term relationship with existing ones. A list in itself did not exist but was compiled after this death based on his correspondence and the knowledge which kilns he preferred to be a patron of.

The earliest mention of his list is from a late Edo period book from 1857 called "Historical Investigation into Domestic Ceramics" (Honchō tōki kōshō).

He favoured seven pottery styles for tea ceremony:

- Asahi ware, later Buzen Province
- Agano ware from Buzen Province
- Akahada ware from Yamato Province
- Kosobe ware from Settsu Province
- Shitoro ware, later Tōtōmi Province
- Takatori ware from Chikuzen Province
- Zeze ware from Ōmi Province

== See also ==
- Six Ancient Kilns
- List of Japanese ceramics sites
