= Iriya earthenware =

Iriya earthenware (入谷土器, Iriya-doki) is a type of historic Japanese pottery found in the area of Taitō, Tokyo.
