= Shiraiwa-yaki =

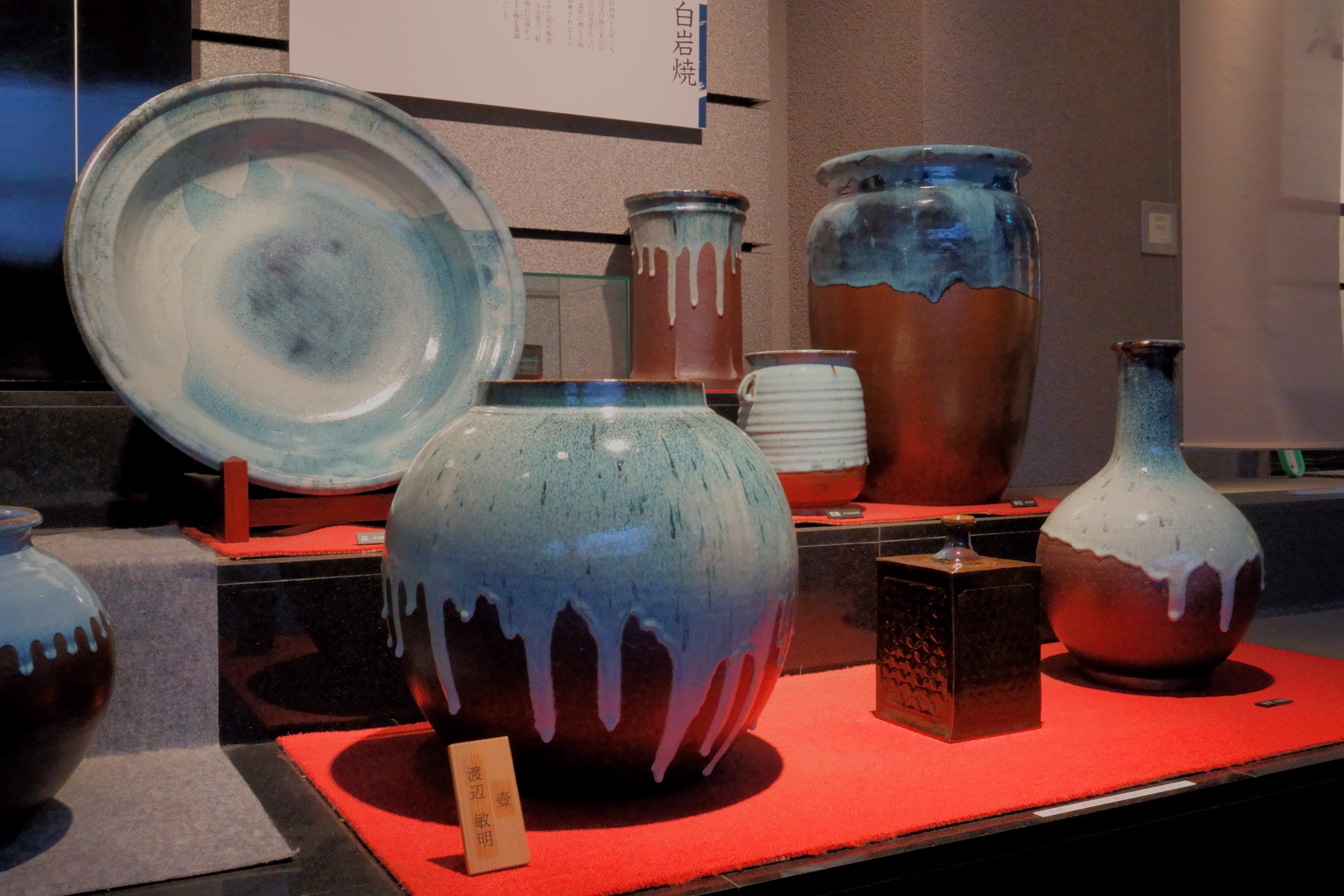
a sample of shiraiwa

Shiraiwa ware (白岩焼 Shiraiwa-yaki) refers to a type of Japanese pottery that is produced in Shiraiwa, Kakunodate, Akita Prefecture, Japan. The tradition began in the 1770s and faded out during the last decade of the 19th century. It was revived, however, during the 1970s and 1980s by a descendant of one of the original Shiraiwa potters and her husband. Their kiln, Wahee-gama, is the only one producing Shiraiwa ware today. Shiraiwa ware is especially known for its characteristic blue glaze. A large blue Shiraiwa ware vase made at Wahee-gama was featured in the 2016 film Godzilla Resurgence.

== See also ==
- List of Japanese ceramics sites
