= Rihei ware =

Type of Japanese pottery

Rihei ware (理平焼, Rihei-yaki) is a type of Japanese pottery traditionally made in Takamatsu, Kagawa prefecture.
