= Inkyūzan ware =

Inkyūzan ware (因久山焼, Inkyūzan-yaki) is a type of Japanese pottery traditionally from Kōge, Tottori prefecture.
