= Ryūmonji ware =

Type of Japanese pottery

Ryūmonji ware (龍門司焼, Ryūmonji-yaki) is a type of Japanese pottery traditionally from Kagoshima Prefecture.

It was started by Korean potters about four hundred years ago.
