= Aizukeizan ware =

Aizukeizan ware (会津慶山焼, Aizukeizan-yaki) refers to a type of Japanese pottery that is produced in Aizuwakamatsu, Fukushima Prefecture, Japan.
