= Mumyōi ware =

Type of Japanese pottery

Mumyōi ware (無名異焼, Mumyōi-yaki) is a type of Japanese pottery traditionally from Sado, Niigata.
