= Shōdai ware =

Type of Japanese pottery

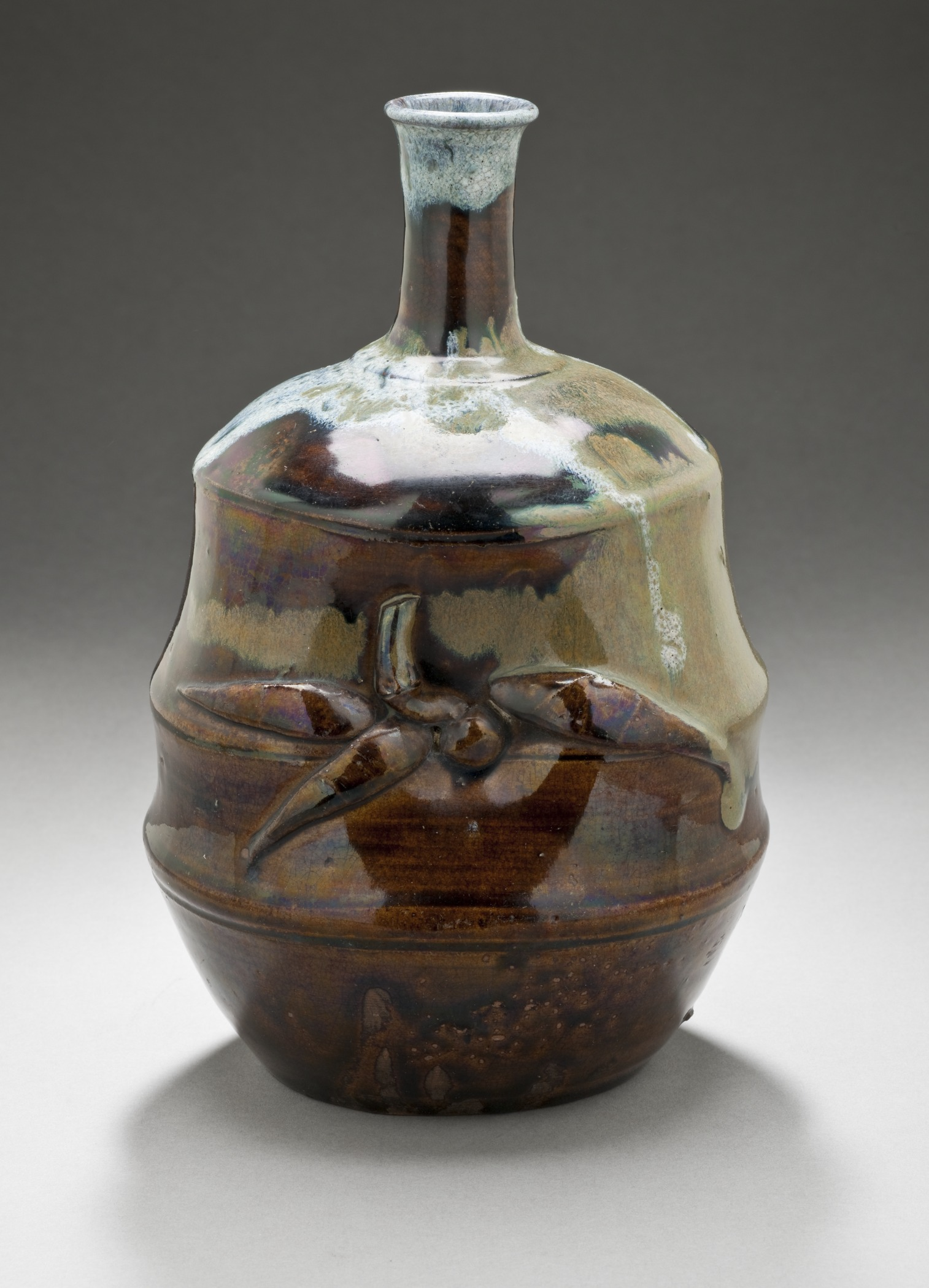
Bamboo-shaped sake bottle (tokkuri), stoneware with brown and white glazes, Edo period, late 17th-early 18th century

Shōdai ware (小代焼, Shōdai-yaki) is a type of Japanese pottery traditionally from Arao, Kumamoto.
