= Izushi ware =

Type of Japanese pottery

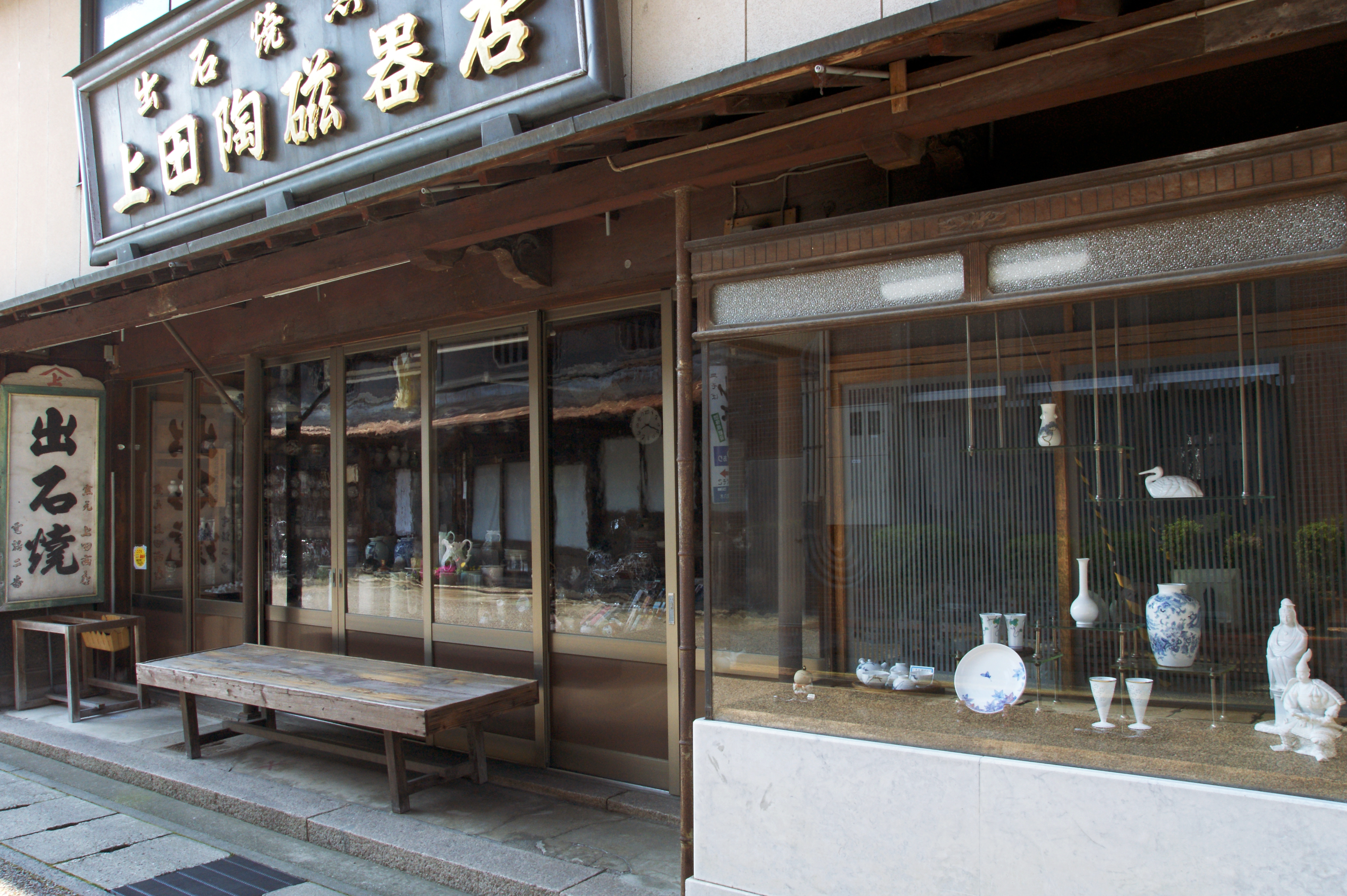
Izushi ware shop in Izushi, Hyōgo

Izushi ware (出石焼, Izushi-yaki) is a type of Japanese pottery traditionally from Izushi, Hyōgo prefecture in western Japan.
