= Tokanabe =

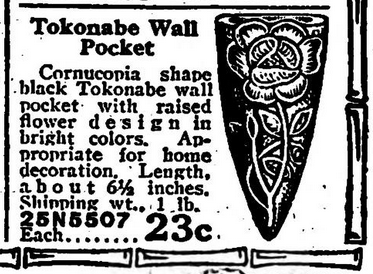
Picture of a "tokonabe" from the 1928 Sears, Roebuck and Co. Fall Catalog

Tokanabe was mold-pressed pottery, made in Japan for the US market in the 1920s and 30s. It was distributed by the Sears Company in their catalogs between 1929 and 1930.

No information is available on specific potters, painters, or manufacturers.

== Characteristics ==
Tokanabe ware was typically black with a stippled texture and hand-painted raised relief designs. Some pieces were also produced in brown, gold or orange. It was stamped Nippon until 1921, when the US Congress passed legislation requiring all products manufactured in Japan for export to the United States to be marked Made in Japan.

== Range ==
Products ranged from incense burners to bowls and vases, including standing and wall vases.
