= Atsumi Kiln =

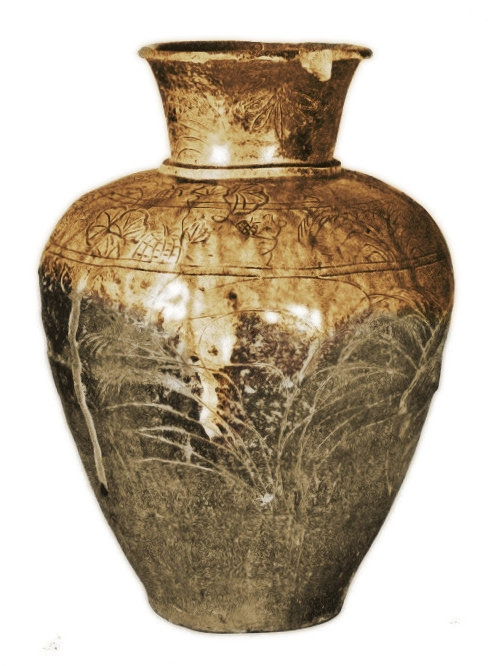
Atsumi pot with a design of autumn grasses (akikusamon), discovered in the Hakusan Burial Mound, Heian period, late 12th century (National Treasure.)

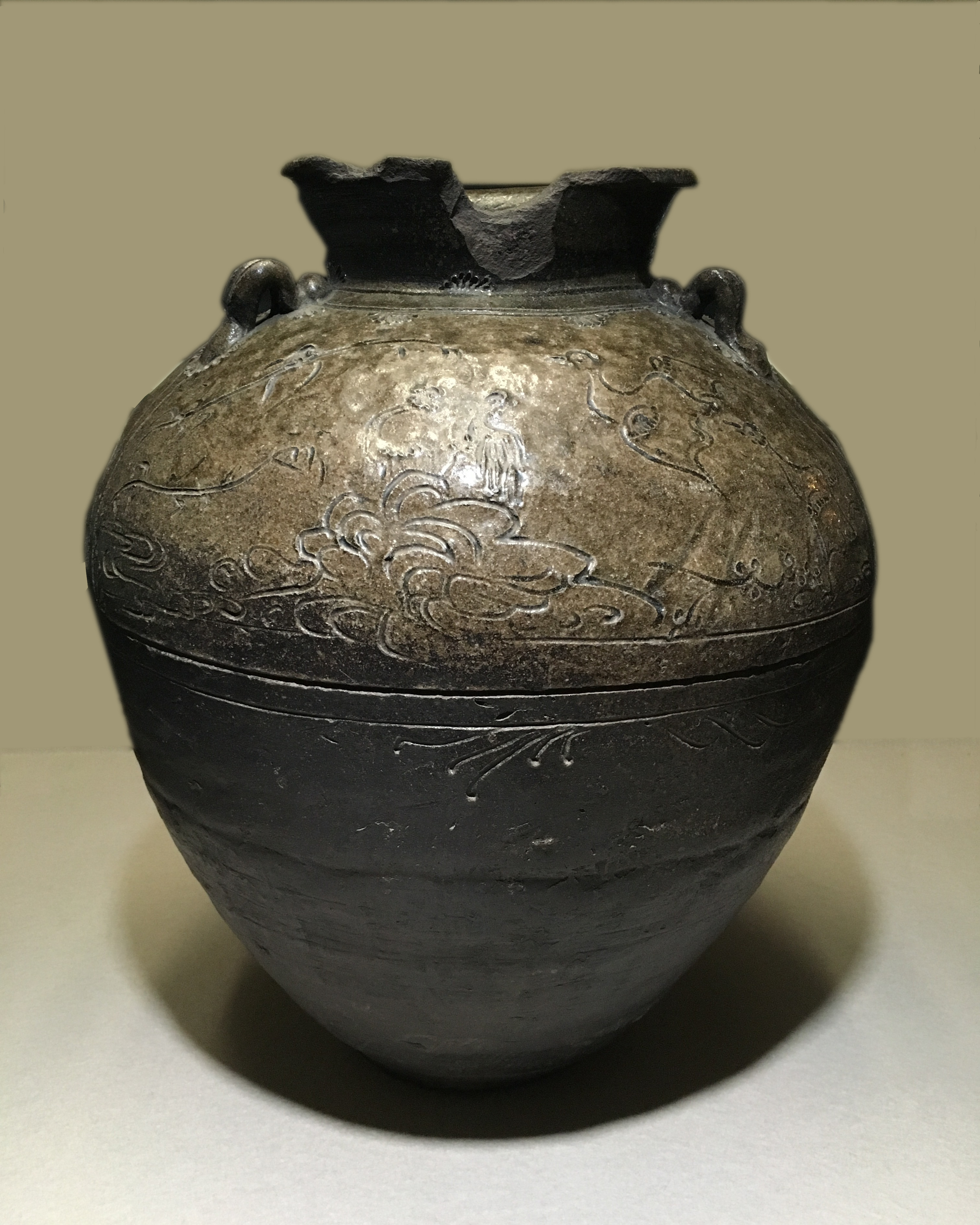
Jar with three decorative lugs, incised herons and reeds design, ash glaze, Final Heian period, 12th century. (Registered Important Cultural Property)

The Atsumi Kiln (渥美窯 Atsumigama) is a generic name for a historic kiln that dates from the late Heian period to the Kamakura period (early 12th century until the 13th century). It was located on the Atsumi Peninsula in Aichi prefecture.

A pot with a design of autumn grasses called akikusamon was discovered in the Hakusan Burial Mound. It dates to the Heian period, during the late 12th century, and is registered as a National Treasure.
