= Zeze ware =

Type of Japanese pottery

Zeze ware (膳所焼, Zeze-yaki) is a type of Japanese pottery traditionally from Ōtsu, in the former Zeze Domain in Ōmi Province. It is one of Enshū's Seven Kilns. Zeze ware is characterised by being extremely thin and light, using a technique called mizu-hiki that adds a small amount of water to the potter's wheel. The majority of works made in Zeze ware are used for tea ceremony.

Despite its popularity with Enshū and his contemporaries, Zeze ware declined in the 18th century. In 1919, a local benefactor named Iwasaki Kenzo revived Zeze ware by opening a new kiln under the guidance of a master ceramist from Kyoto. Iwasaki's oldest son, Shinjo Iwasaki (1913-2009), continued the tradition of Zeze pottery.

A museum dedicated to Zeze ware was established in Ōtsu, Shiga in 1987.
