= Kirigome ware =

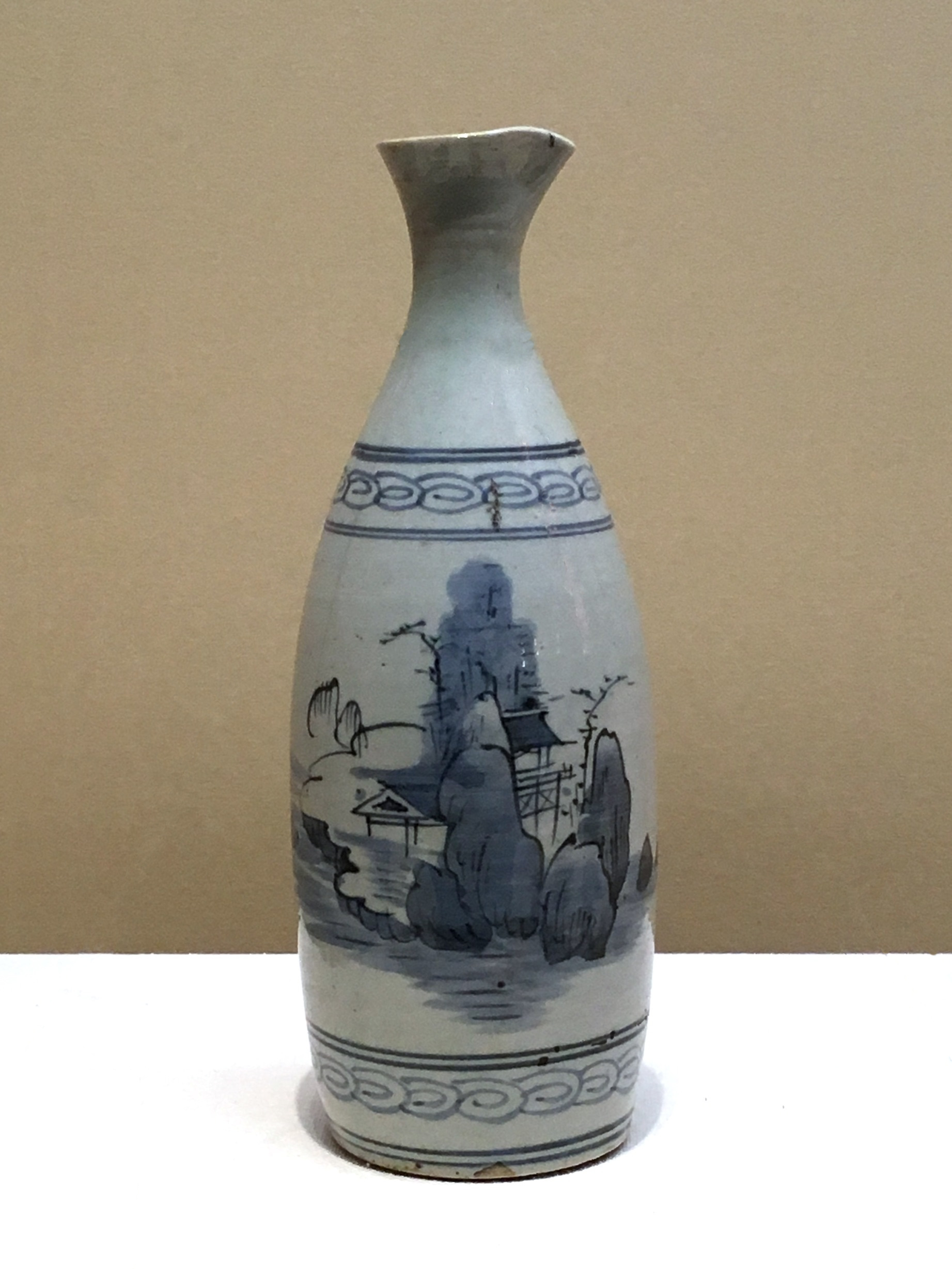
Kirigome ware sake bottle, palace and landscape design, blue underglaze. Edo period, 19th century

Kirigome ware (Japanese: 切込焼, romanized: Kirigome-yaki) is a type of Japanese blue and white pottery originally from Miyazaki, Miyagi Prefecture in the Tōhoku region of northern Japan.

The origins of Kirigome ware are not completely clear, but date back to between 1844 and 1860 in the Edo period.
