= Iwami ware =

Type of Japanese pottery

Iwami ware (石見焼, Iwami-yaki) is a type of Japanese pottery traditionally from Shimane Prefecture.
