= Amakusa pottery =

Type of Japanese pottery

Amakusa pottery (天草陶磁器, Amakusa tōjiki) is a type of Japanese pottery traditionally from the Amakusa islands, in Kumamoto Prefecture.
