= Tamba ware =

Type of Japanese pottery

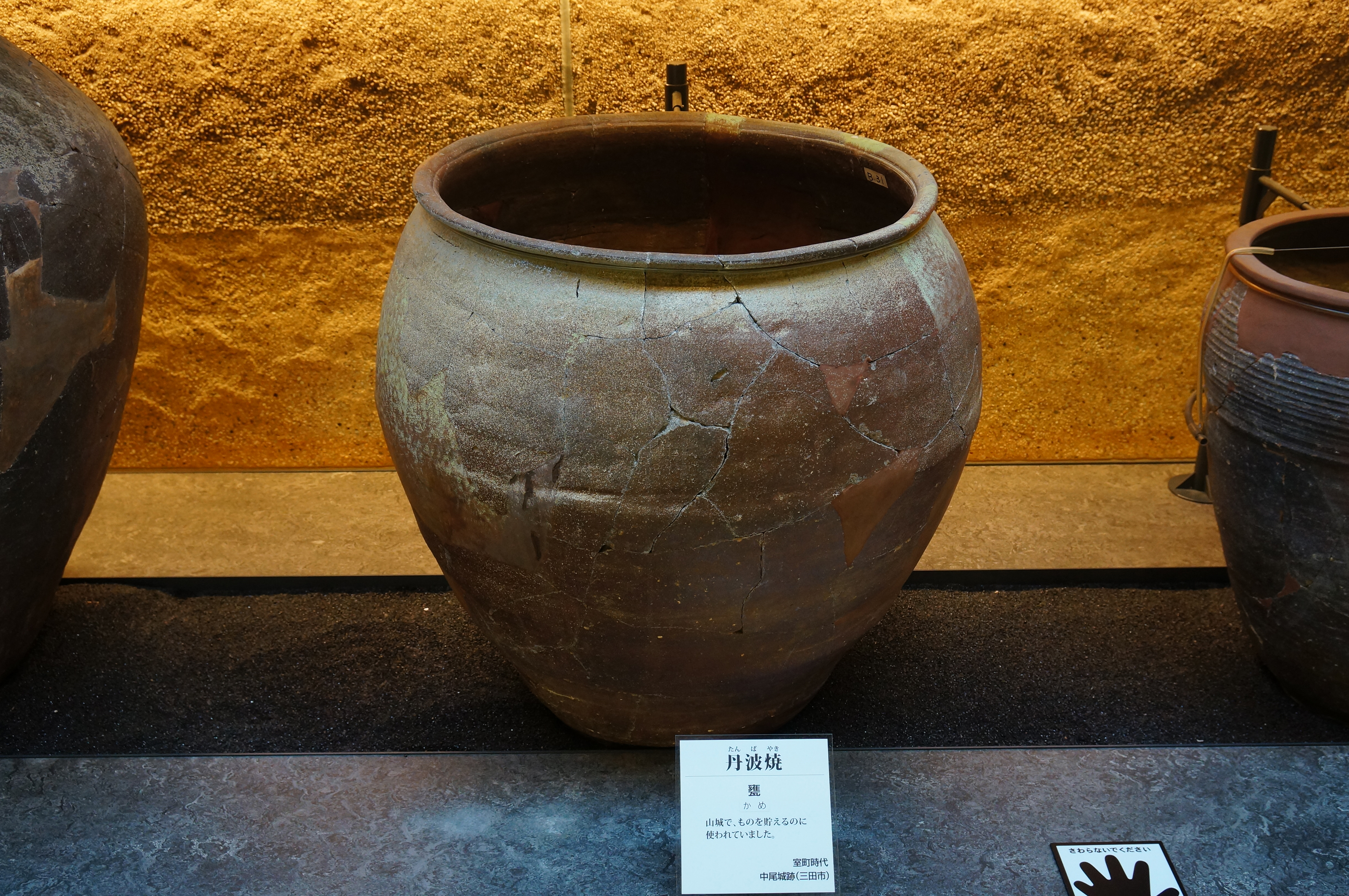
Tamba ware kame vessel

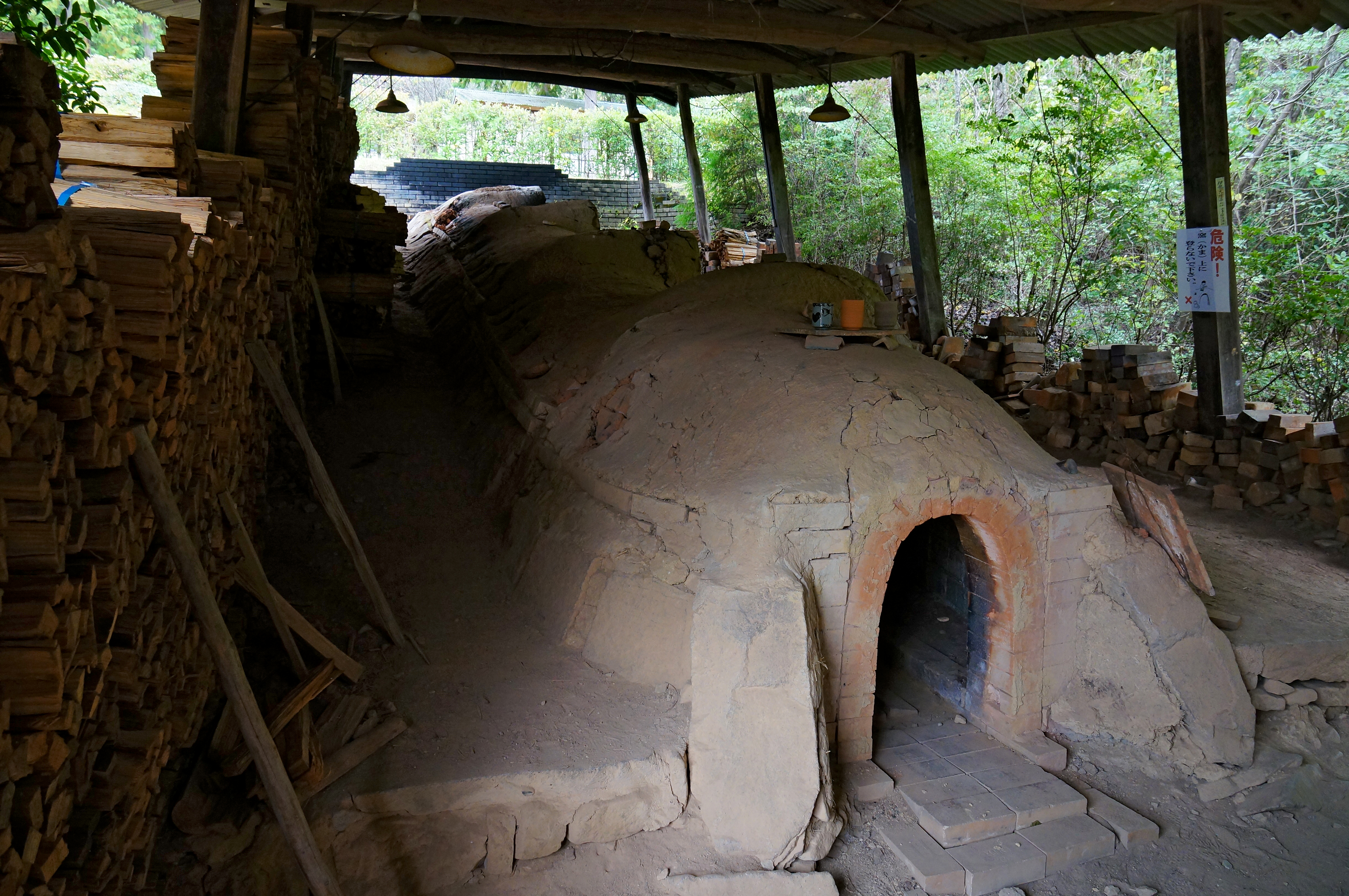
Kiln at Tachikui Sue-no-sato in Sasayama

Tamba ware, also spelled Tanba, and also known as Tamba-Tachikui ware (丹波立杭焼, Tamba-Tachikui-yaki) is a type of Japanese pottery produced in Sasayama and Tachikui in Hyōgo Prefecture.

== History ==
It is considered one of the Six Ancient Kilns of Japan.

== See also ==
- Japanese craft
- List of Traditional Crafts of Japan
