= Ōtani ware =

Type of Japanese pottery

Ōtani ware (大谷焼, Ōtani-yaki) is a type of Japanese pottery most famously known for its large size. Ōtani is made in the part of Naruto, Tokushima known as Ōtani.

== History ==
In 2003, Ōtani pottery was designated as a national traditional handicraft.

== Characteristics ==
The potter's wheel used in the production of Ōtani pottery is known as a 'nerokuro,' literally a 'lying potter's wheel.' One person must lie on their side and turn the wheel with their feet. The potter and the assistant must have perfect timing in order to create a successful product. Ōtani pottery is the only pottery in Japan that still uses this technique.

The large containers were used to hold indigo dye, a specialty of the region. There are also many small bowls, tea ceremony tools, vases, cups, plates, and other forms of pottery made at Ōtani.
