= Kosobe ware =

Type of Japanese pottery

Kosobe ware (古曽部焼, Kosobe-yaki) is a type of Japanese pottery traditionally from Osaka Prefecture.
