= Asahi ware =

Type of Japanese pottery

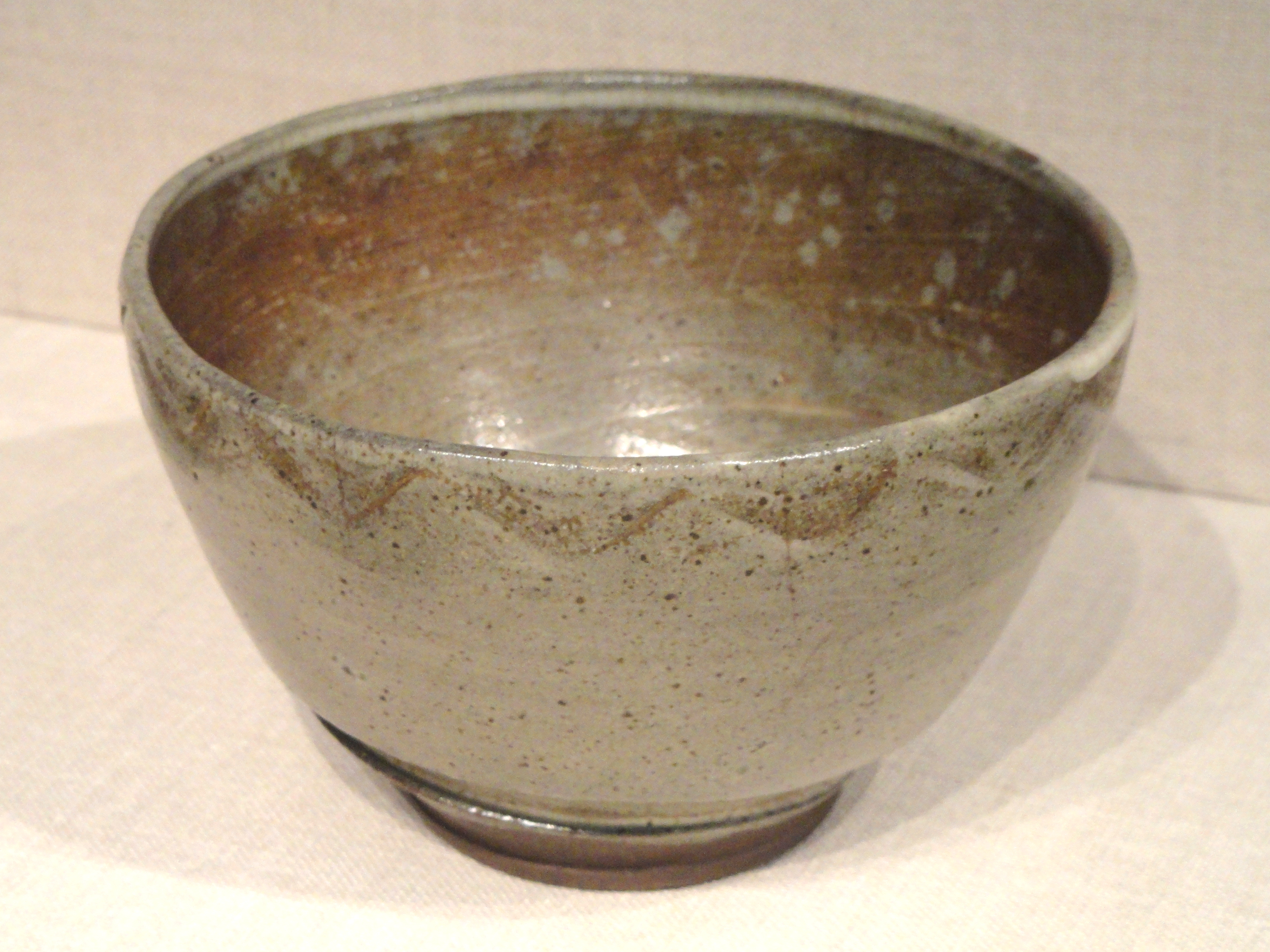
Asahi stoneware tea bowl with wood-ash glaze, Edo period, 18th century

Asahi ware (朝日焼, Asahi-yaki) is a type of Japanese pottery traditionally from Uji, Kyoto.

Matsubayashi Hōsai XVI (松林豊斎 十六代) is one of the eminent masters of Asahi.

== History ==
Asahi kilns began production in the Keichō era (1596-1615) in Uji, Kyoto. Asahi-yaki was established with other new kilns of the time such as Akahada-yaki, Zeze-yaki, Akashi-yaki, and Shizuhata-yaki, Kiyomizu-yaki.

Since the founder of the Asahi kiln, Tōsaku, it has provided tea bowls treasured for preparing tea whipped tea to nobility, warrior rulers, and tea masters. Years after Kobori Enshu's death, a tea master in the seventeenth century, a prestigious list of seven kilns would be created. Known as Enshu's Seven Kilns, it included Takatori, Agano, Shidoro, Akahada, Zeze, Asahi, and Kosobe.

Asahi ware has been in continuous production for over 400 years, through sixteen generations of the Matsubayashi family. The first Asahi ware kiln was built between the shift from the Momoyama Period (c. 1585–1605) and the Edo Period (c. 1605–1867), by Tōsaku. It was with the rise of the Japanese tea ceremony that Asahi-yaki began to see commercial success. However, during the Edo period, the potters were reduced to firing roof tiles. This continued through the time of the eighth family head, Chobei VIII through the 1860s. In 1864 in the Kinmon Incident, a part of the royal Kyoto place burned down and the Asahi family provided new roof tiles.

The Asahi family kiln faced hardships again as the twelfth generation owner, Shosai (1865-1932), struggled to maintain the business through the Meiji Era (1868-1912) in Japan. Through a chance visit by the then Crown-Prince Yoshihito, they revived their popularity. One of Shosai's son's, Matubayashi Tsurunosuke, contributed to the early development of the Leach Pottery in St. Ives, UK. In 2010, an important discovery uncovered many boxes full of documents belonging to the family.

== Characteristics ==
Asahi ware is primarily used for tea ceremonies and consists of tea bowls, lidded cold water vessels, and other utensils, for both the preparation of matcha (powdered tea) and sencha (steeped green tea). A characteristic of Asahi ware comes from the imprinting on the underside of the productions. Examples of Asahi ware typically bear the impressed characters Asahi [朝日], on the unglazed base. Each piece is engraved with a small metal seal graven with the characteristics for ‘Asahi’ (朝日).

Until the Meiji period the Asahi potters used clay deposited from Mt. Asahi in the Uji region. Today, the potters use clay deposits from Shikiwara and Mt. Orii which are opposite Mt. Asashi. Asahi potters only use clay from the Uji region, deposited by the Uji River. The mined clay is then left to age for over a century before it is used.

=== Glaze ===
The Asahi Yaki currently uses the following glazes in its production:

- Matsubaiyu / Pine ash glaze - It is characterized by a greenish coloration due to iron of pine. Whenever the sloping kiln is employed, the fuel used the split red-pine logs. The ash results from such firing is to create this particular glaze.
- Geppakuyu / Moon white glaze - Those that had a purplish mottled due to copper coloration on the blue white clay of the moon white glaze were called "Kinyo"

=== Firing Effects ===
- Kase / Fawn Spot - Features a complex gradation of light yellow and gray character. A spot pattern like a deer's back is one of its features.
- Hanshi - Warm hearted orange like the morning sun is its feature, the color changes as much as use
- Benikase / Red Fawn Spot - The higher the proportion of iron in the clay, the more the hue of transparent-grazed areas change reddish-black than Kase

The current Matsubayashi Hosai became the 16th generation head of Asahi warei in 2016. He continues the Asahi ware traditional aesthetic of kirei sabi (beauty and simplicity) based on the aesthetics of the tea ceremony master Kobori Enshu. Today Hosai XVI produces mostly tea utensils like tea bowls, tea caddies, water jars, and vases. As an innovation, he has added the Geppaku overglaze technique to production pieces at the workshop.
