= Akahada ware =

Type of Japanese pottery

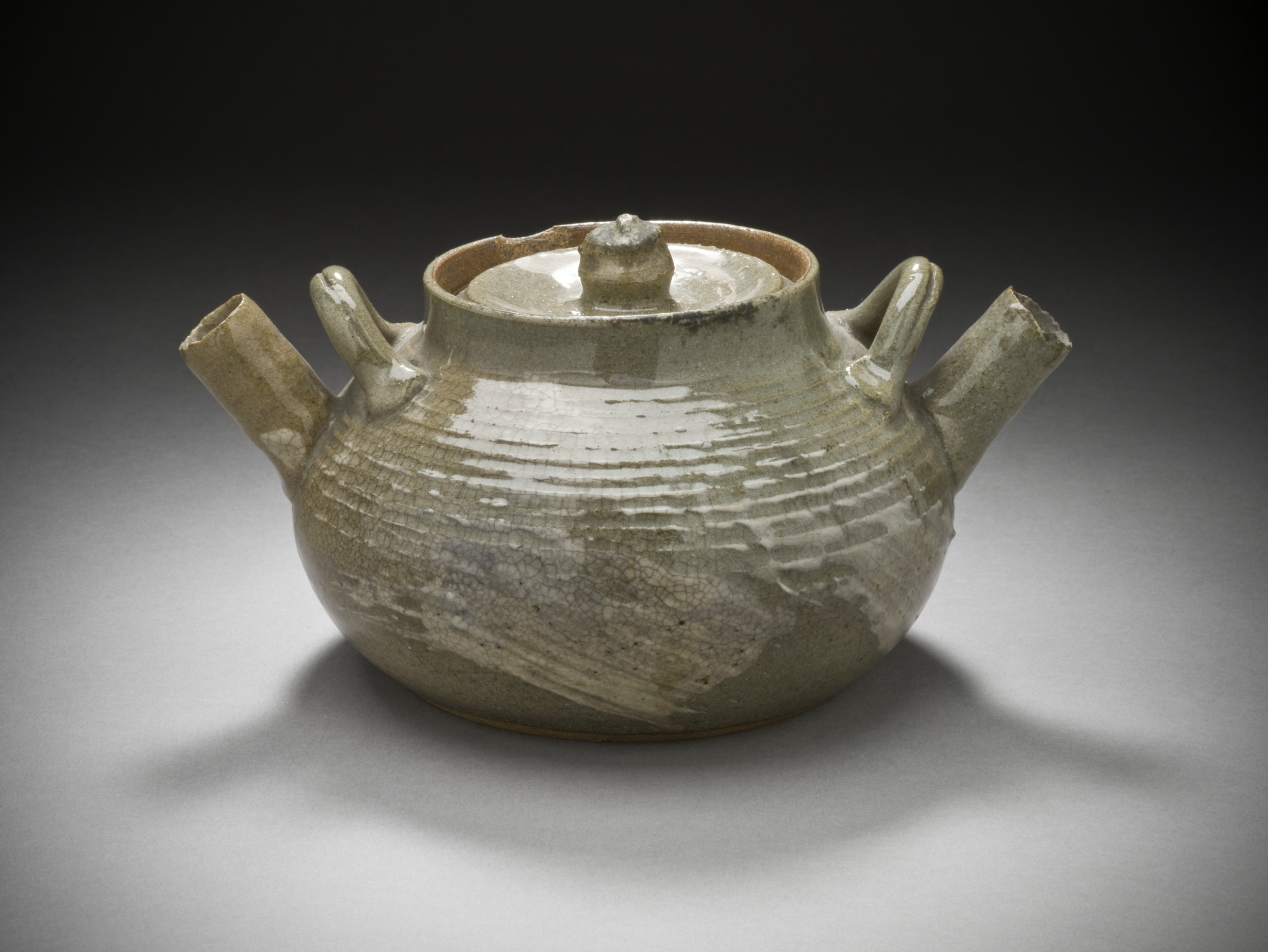
Akahada ware double-spouted sake decanter, Edo period, early 19th century

Akahada ware (赤膚焼, Akahada-yaki) is a type of Japanese pottery traditionally from Nara Prefecture focused on primarily Tea Ceremony ware.

== History ==
Starting in 1585 Akahada ware was created by several kilns and became a favorite of Korobi Enshū There was a serious decline due to the political changes in the mid 18th century, causing the kilns to be moved around and changed. In 1785 the feudal lord in Koriyama castle in Nara Yanagisawa Yasumitsu, asked two potters named Inosuke and Jihee to revitalize the kilns. The kilns were eventually moved to Koriyama and had a central, eastern, and western kiln. The central kiln was run by Okuda Mokuhaku. The western kiln was run by the two potters Sobei and Shijiro. After 1785 the kilns had the patronage of the daimyo of Koriyama castle where they remain in production today. British antiquarian Augustus Wollaston Franks owned and wrote about Akahada ware in the 19th century.

== Characteristics ==
The clay is milky white, sometimes with a hint of red, with clear glaze. The most common form is tea wares such as cups, jars, and bowls. A common defining feature is Nara-e drawings painted onto the surface under the glaze featuring scenes from fairy tales, noh songs, and other similar sources.

== Current makers and productions ==
Currently, there are six Akahada ware kilns operating in Nara today. The eighth-generation Furuse kiln, the fourth-generation Oshiro Akiyama kiln, another Oshiro kiln, the ninth-generation Oshiro Sheijin kiln, the fourth-generation Ogawa kiln, and the eighth-generation Onishi kiln.
