= Shitoro ware =

Type of Japanese pottery

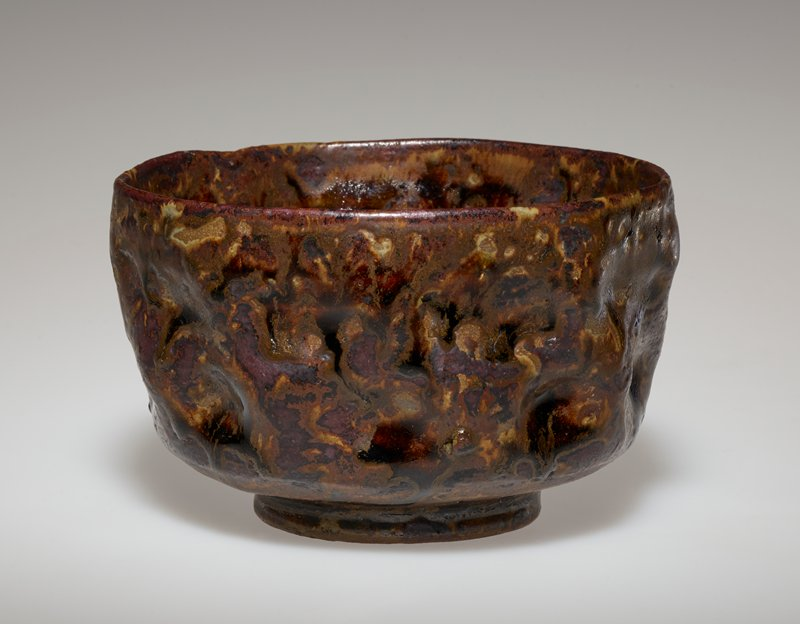
Shitoro ware tea bowl, circa 18th–19th century

Shitoro ware (志戸呂焼, Shitoro-yaki) is a type of Japanese pottery traditionally from Shimada, Shizuoka.

== History ==
The roots of Shitoro ware go back to the Muromachi period, to potters in the town of Mino, in Gifu Prefecture, an area of Japan with quality clay deposits for making pottery. During the 15th century Tenshou era, the shogun Tokugawa Ieyasu recommended the ceramic ware being made in the area as a "specialty good". Shitoro ware was admired by Kobori Enshu and others who practiced the tea ceremony. Shitoro ware pots are moisture resistant and are strong and sturdy.
