= Japanese pottery and porcelain =

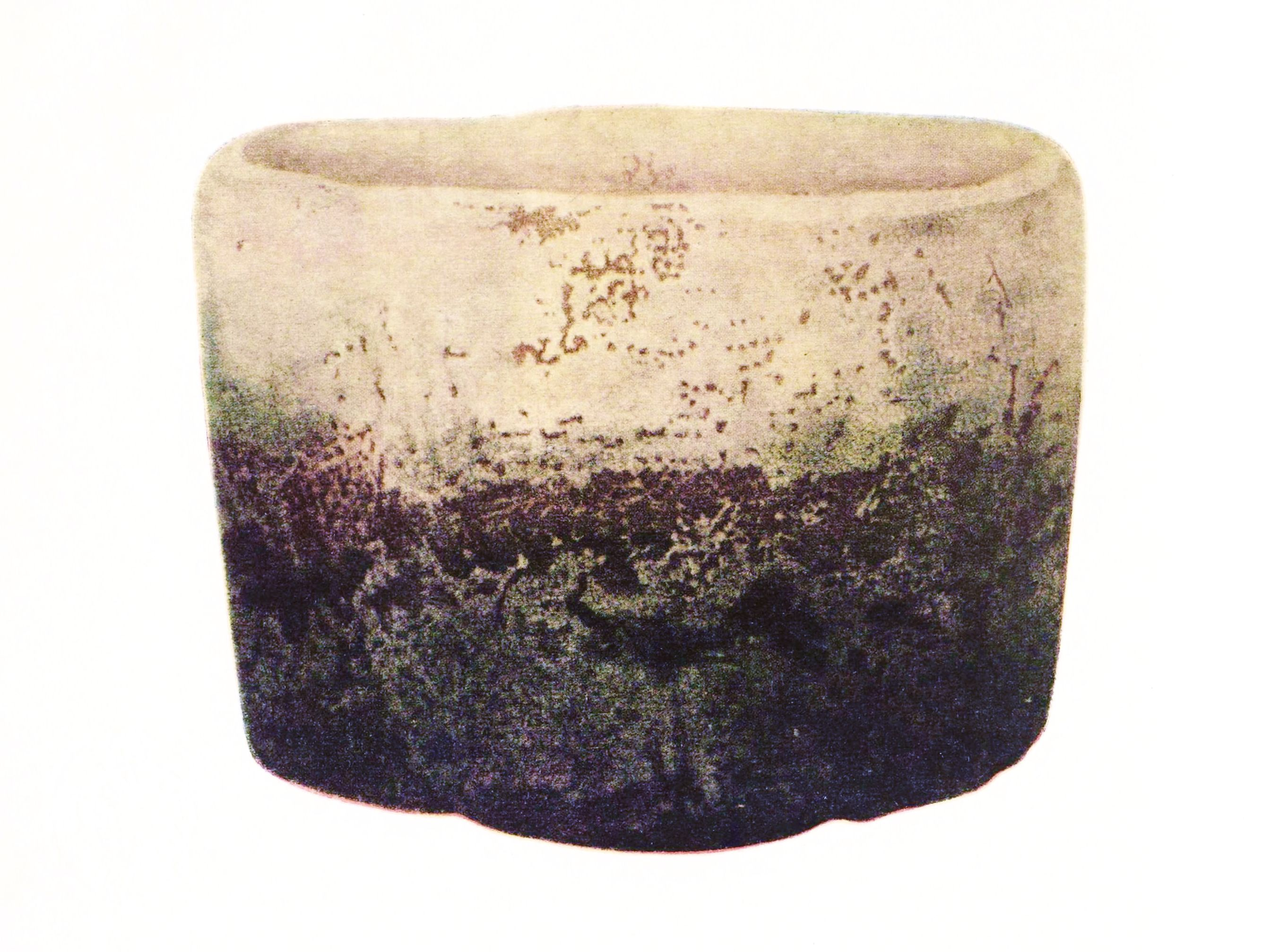
"Fujisan" white Raku ware tea bowl (chawan) by Hon'ami Kōetsu, Edo period (National Treasure)

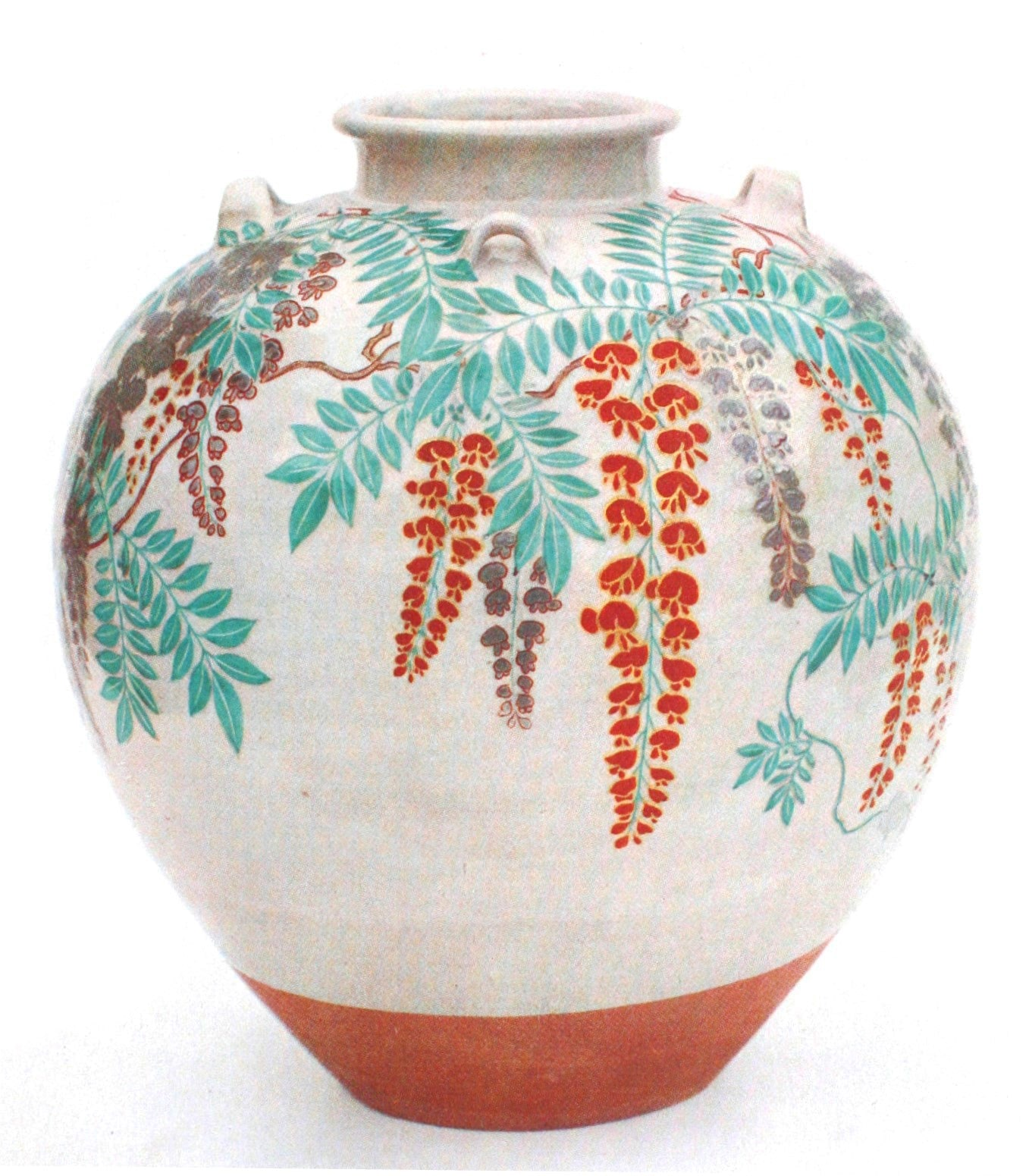
Tea-leaf jar with a design of wisteria by Nonomura Ninsei, Edo period (National Treasure)

Pottery and porcelain (陶磁器, tōjiki; also yakimono (焼きもの), or tōgei (陶芸)) is one of the oldest Japanese crafts and art forms, dating back to the Neolithic period. Types have included earthenware, pottery, stoneware, porcelain, and blue-and-white ware. Japan has an exceptionally long and successful history of ceramic production. Earthenwares were made as early as the Jōmon period (10,500–300 BC), giving Japan one of the oldest ceramic traditions in the world. Japan is further distinguished by the unusual esteem that ceramics hold within its artistic tradition, owing to the enduring popularity of the tea ceremony. During the Azuchi-Momoyama period (1573–1603), kilns throughout Japan produced ceramics with unconventional designs. In the early Edo period, the production of porcelain commenced in the Hizen-Arita region of Kyushu, employing techniques imported from Korea. These porcelain works became known as Imari wares, named after the port of Imari from which they were exported to various markets, including Europe.

Japanese ceramic history records the names of numerous distinguished ceramists, and some were artist-potters, e.g. Hon'ami Kōetsu, Ninsei, Ogata Kenzan, and Aoki Mokubei. Japanese anagama kilns also have flourished through the ages, and their influence weighs with that of the potters. Another important Japanese constituent of the art is the continuing popularity of unglazed high-fired stoneware even after porcelain became popular. Since the 4th century AD, Japanese ceramics have often been influenced by the artistic sensibilities of neighbouring East Asian civilizations such as Chinese and Korean-style pottery. Japanese ceramists and potters took inspiration from their East Asian artistic counterparts by transforming and translating the Chinese and Korean prototypes into a uniquely Japanese creation, with the resultant form being distinctly Japanese in character. Since the mid-17th century when Japan started to industrialize, high-quality standard wares produced in factories became popular exports to Europe. In the 20th century, a homegrown cottage ceramics industry began to take root and emerge. Major Japanese ceramic companies include Noritake and Toto Ltd.

Japanese pottery is distinguished by two polarized aesthetic traditions. On the one hand, there is a tradition of very simple and roughly finished pottery, mostly in earthenware and using a muted palette of earth colours. This relates to Zen Buddhism and many of the greatest masters were priests, especially in early periods. Many pieces are also related to the Japanese tea ceremony and embody the aesthetic principles of wabi-sabi. Most raku ware, where the final decoration is partly random, is in this tradition. The other tradition is of highly finished and brightly coloured factory wares, mostly in porcelain, with complex and balanced decoration, which develops Chinese porcelain styles in a distinct way. A third tradition, of simple but perfectly formed and glazed stonewares, also relates more closely to both Chinese and Korean traditions. In the 16th century, a number of styles of traditional utilitarian rustic wares then in production became admired for their simplicity, and their forms have often been kept in production to the present day for a collectors market.

== Ceramics types ==
The types of ceramics can be divided into five groups:

- unglazed earthenware (素焼きの土器 "Suyaki no doki"): fired at high temperatures without any glaze, resulting in a natural, rustic appearance.
- glazed earthenware (施和的器 seyūtōki or 低火度前 teikadoyū): fired at relatively low temperatures 800–900°C using lead as the medium, the technique was introduced from the Korean peninsula in the 7th century. Sansai (三彩) is another type of technique using lead glaze.
- unglazed stoneware (焼き締め陶窓 yakishime tōki): fired at high temperatures without applying a coat of glaze. In the Middle Ages, it was used for living utensils such as vases, pots and other everyday items, and in the Azuchi-Momoyama period, it was modified for use in tea rooms due to its simple taste.
- glazed stoneware (施和陶器 seyūtōki or 高火度和 kōkadoyū): fired at temperatures of 1250°C or higher. In many cases, the base is not pure white, but grey or brown in colour. It has a softer texture than porcelain and absorbs some water.
- porcelain (磁器 jiki): a white colour with a high silica content and few impurities. Hard ware made by firing clay at high temperatures. The technique was introduced from the Korean peninsula at the beginning of the Edo period and production began in Arita, Hizen Province, Kyushu.
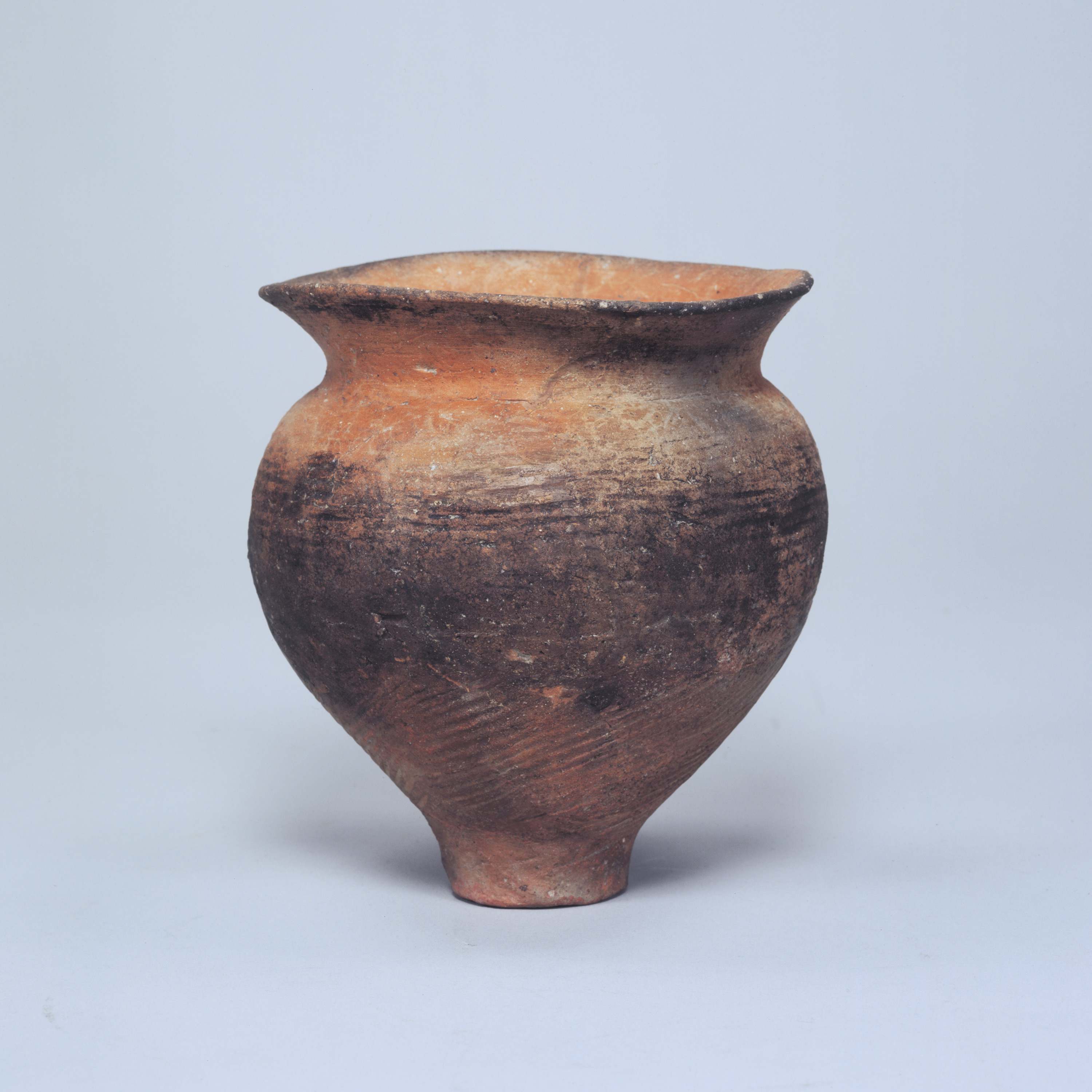
unglazed earthenware

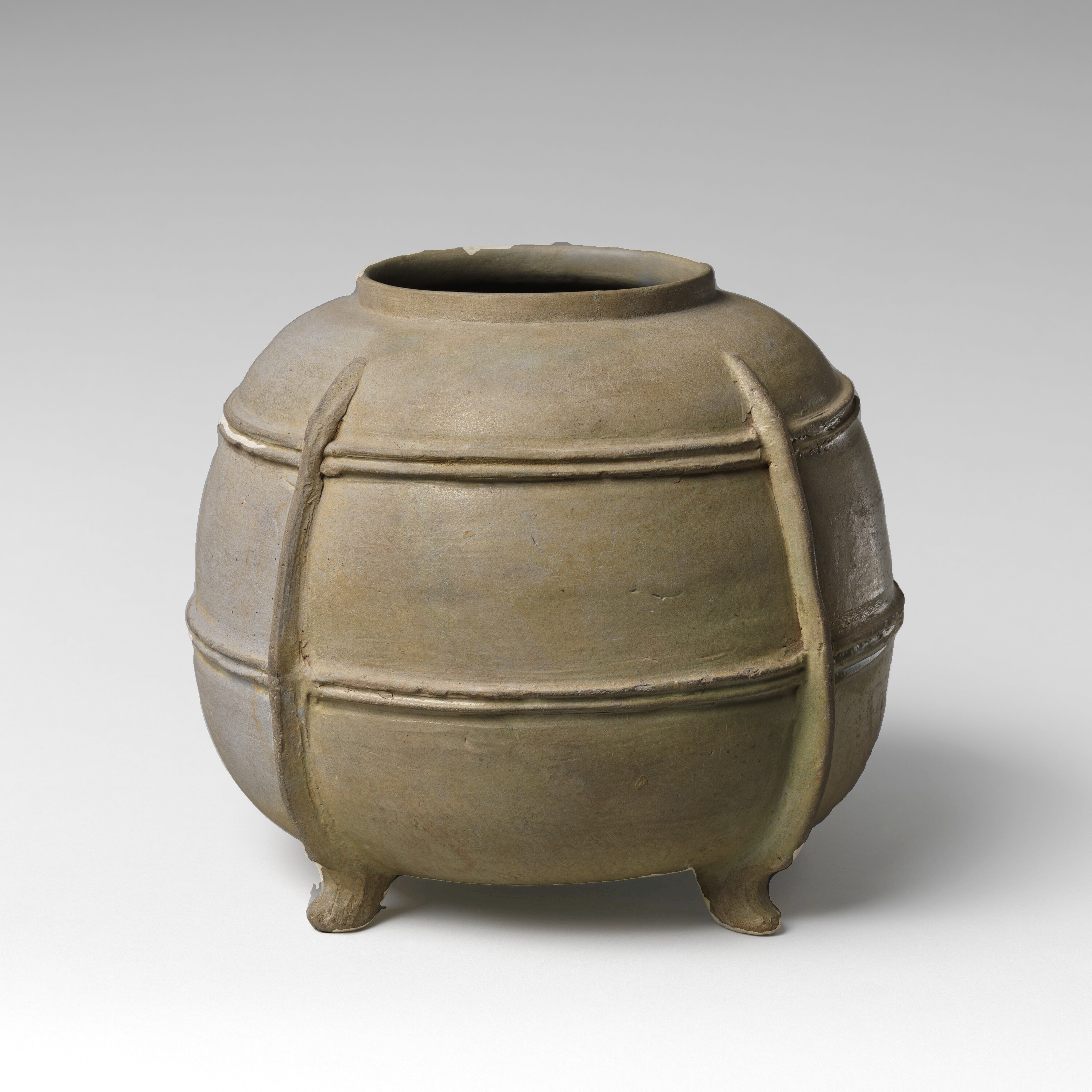
glazed earthenware

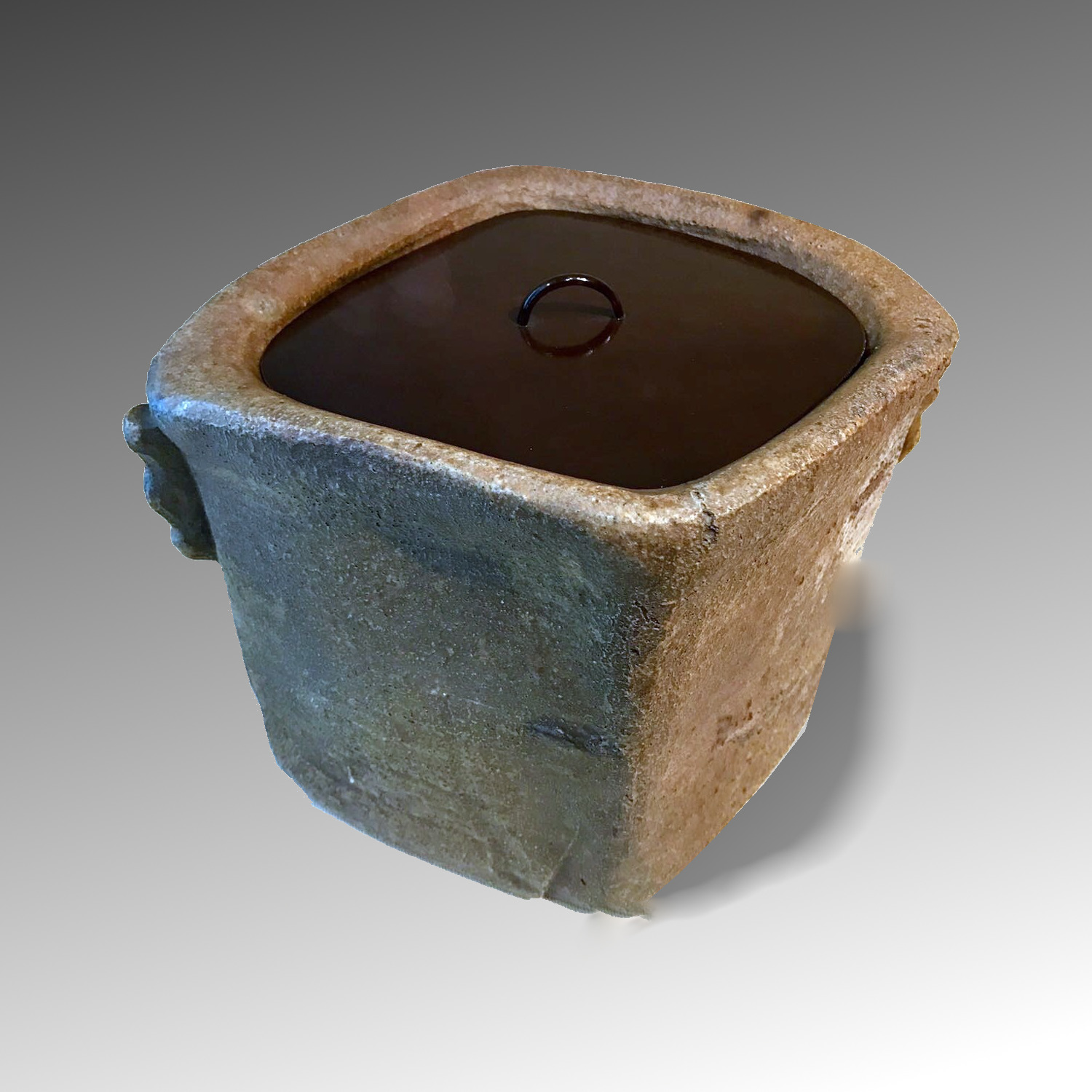
unglazed stoneware

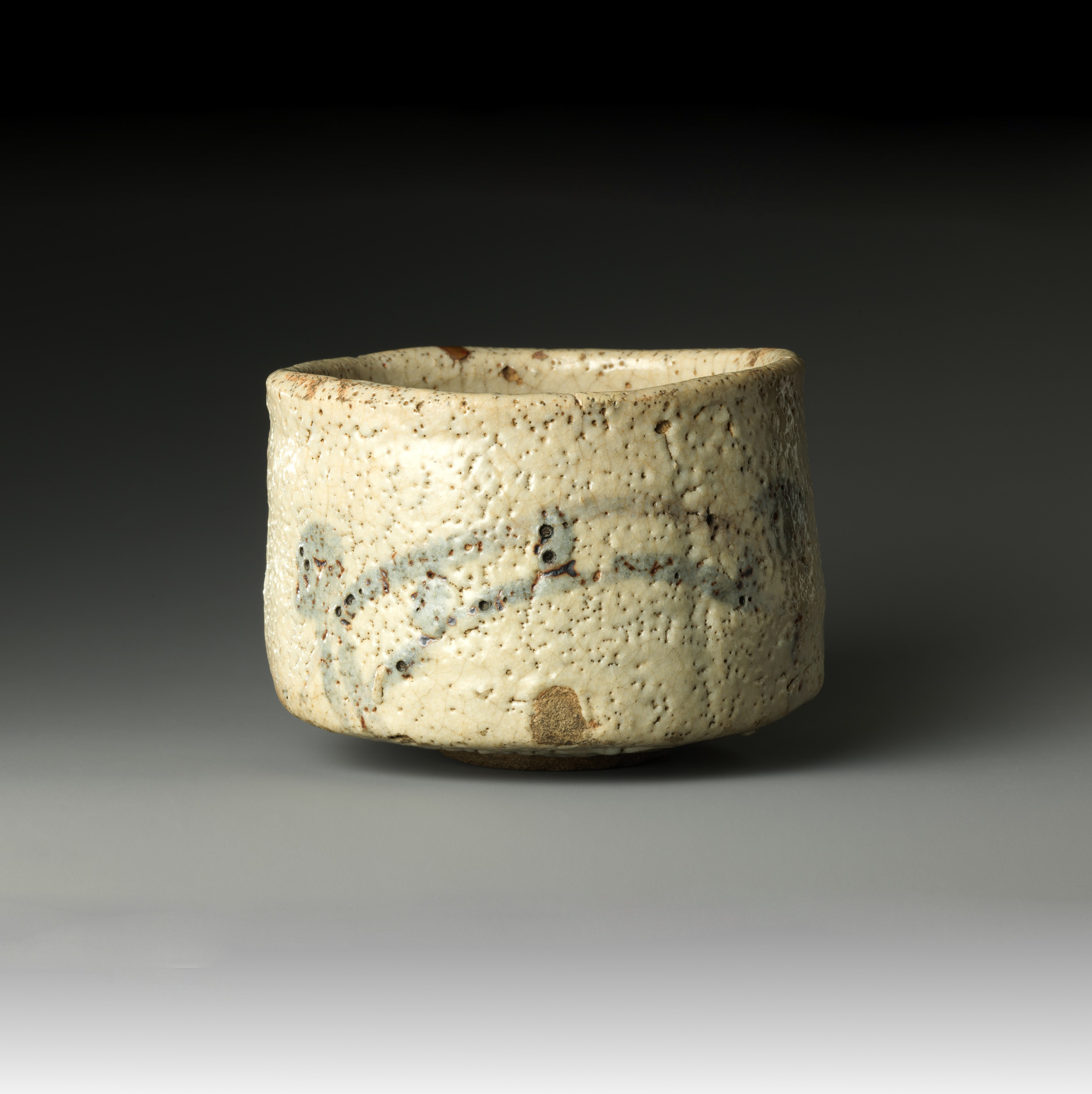
glazed stoneware

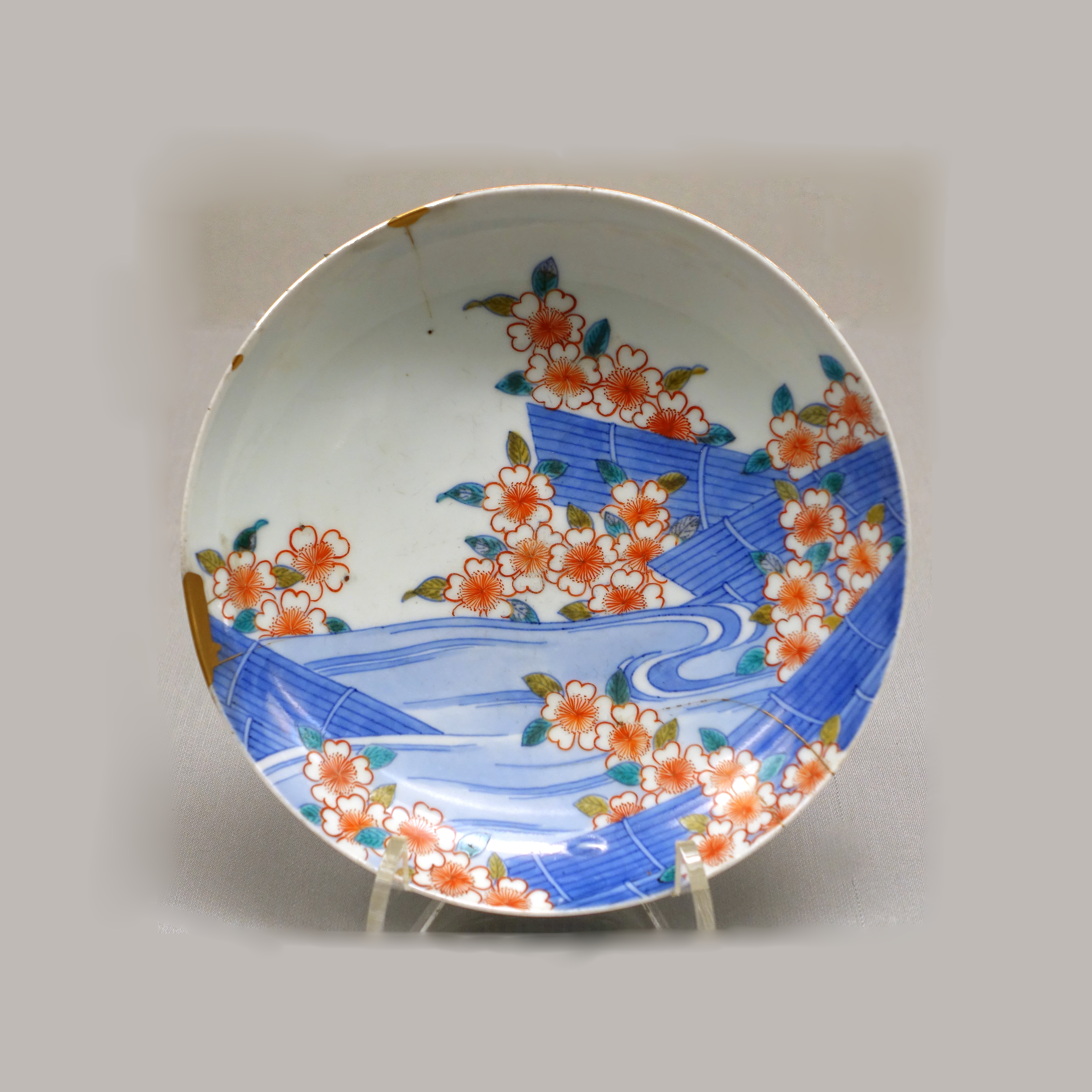
porcelain

== Vessel types ==
Some of the typical vessel (器 utsuwa) types are:

- tea bowl (茶碗 chawan)
- jar (壷 tsubo)
- bowl (鉢 hachi)
- tea caddy (茶入 chaire)

The various features of a vessel such as the opening, rim, neck, wall, inside, foot, surface markings, etc. all have standardised names in Japanese.

== History ==
=== Jōmon period ===
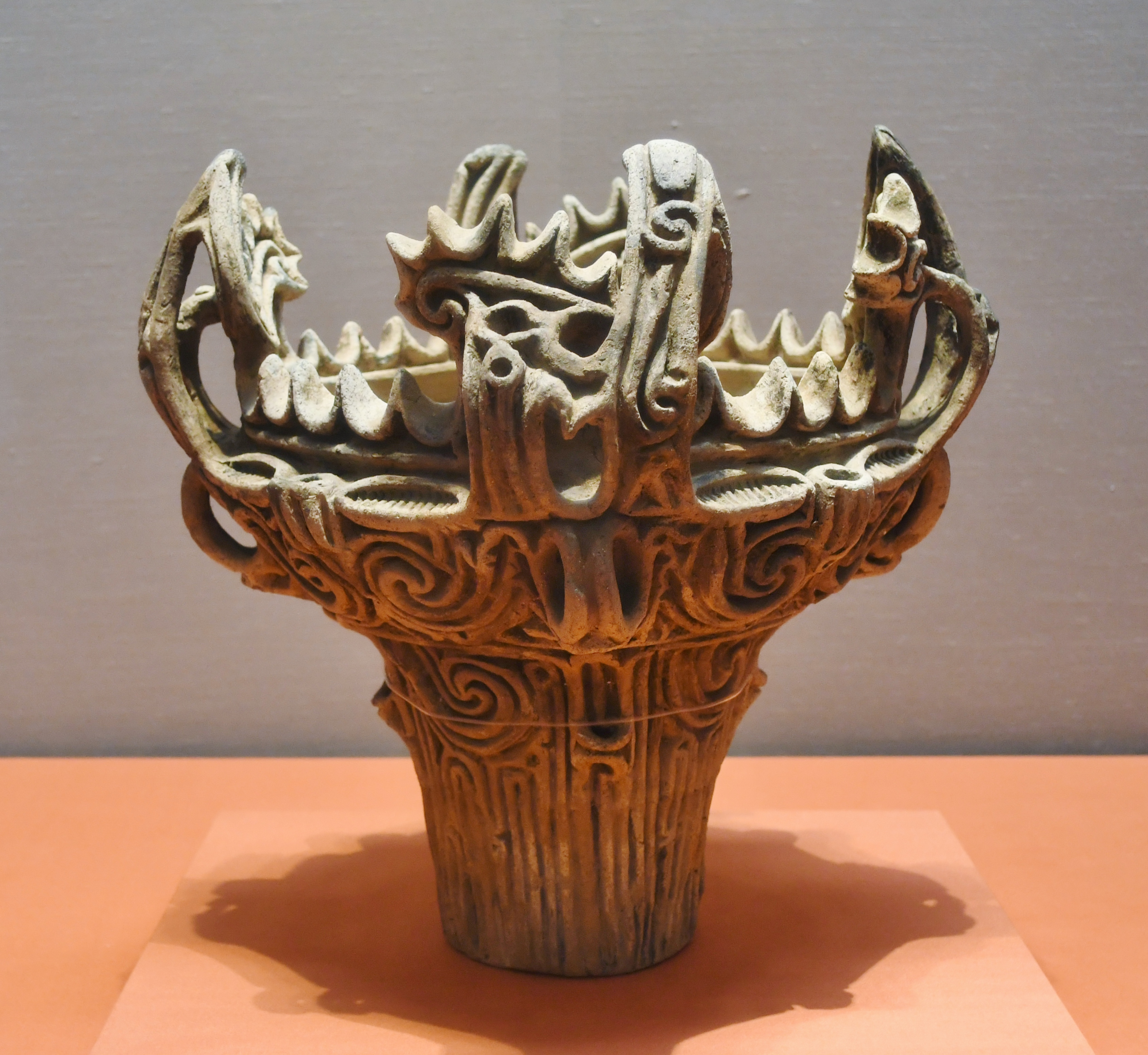
Jōmon pottery flame-style (火焔土器, kaen doki) vessel, 3000–2000 BCE, attributed provenance Umataka, Nagaoka, Niigata

In the Neolithic period (c. 11th millennium BC), the earliest soft earthenware was made.

During the early Jōmon period in the 6th millennium BC typical coil-made ware appeared, decorated with hand-impressed rope patterns. Jōmon pottery developed a flamboyant style at its height and was simplified in the later Jōmon period. The pottery was formed by coiling clay ropes and fired in an open fire.

=== Yayoi period ===
In about the 4th–3rd centuries BC Yayoi period, Yayoi pottery appeared which was another style of earthenware characterised by a simple pattern or no pattern. Jōmon, Yayoi, and later Haji ware shared the firing process but had different styles of design.

=== Kofun period ===
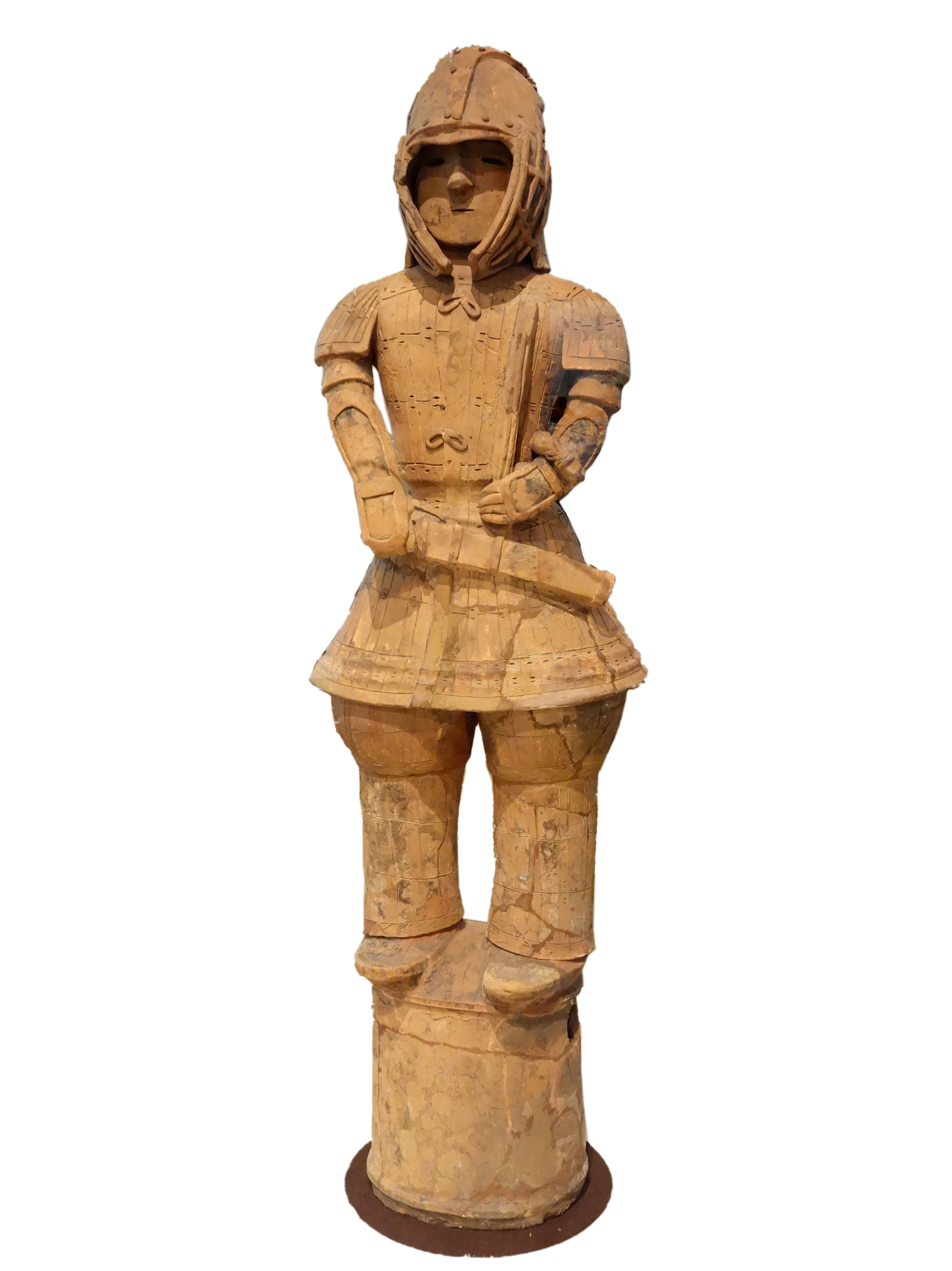
Haniwa warrior in keiko armor, Kofun period, 6th century (National Treasure)

In the 3rd to 4th centuries AD, the anagama kiln, a roofed-tunnel kiln on a hillside, and the potter's wheel appeared, brought to Kyushu island from the Korean peninsula.

The anagama kiln could produce stoneware, Sue pottery, fired at high temperatures of over 1,200–1,300 °C (2,190–2,370 °F), sometimes embellished with accidents produced when introducing plant material to the kiln during the reduced-oxygen phase of firing. Its manufacture began in the 5th century and continued in outlying areas until the 14th century. Although several regional variations have been identified, Sue was remarkably homogeneous throughout Japan. The function of Sue pottery, however, changed over time: during the Kofun period (AD 300–710) it was primarily funerary ware; during the Nara period (710–94) and the Heian period (794–1185), it became an elite tableware; and finally it was used as a utilitarian ware and for the ritual vessels for Buddhist altars.

Contemporary Haji ware and haniwa funerary objects were earthenware like Yayoi.

=== Heian period ===
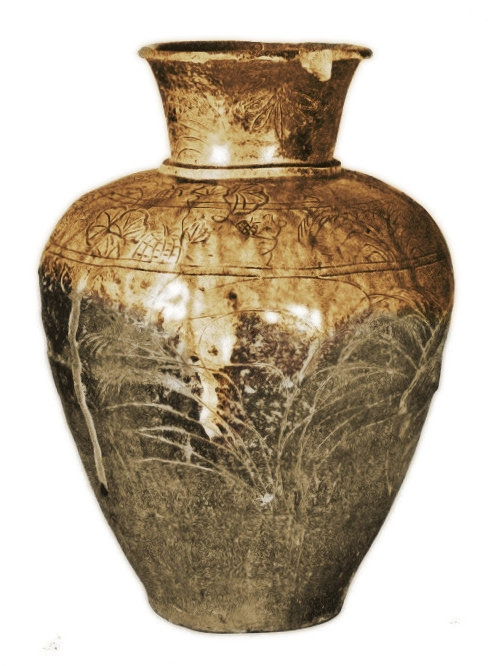
Atsumi ware pot with design of autumn grasses (akikusamon), discovered in the Hakusan Burial Mound. Heian period, second half of 12th century (National Treasure)

Although a three-color lead glaze technique was introduced to Japan from the Tang dynasty of China in the 8th century, official kilns produced only simple green lead glaze for temples in the Heian period, around 800–1200.

Kamui ware appeared in this time, as well as Atsumi ware and Tokoname ware.

=== Kamakura period ===
Until the 17th century, unglazed stoneware was popular for the heavy-duty daily requirements of a largely agrarian society; funerary jars, storage jars, and a variety of kitchen pots typify the bulk of the production. Some of the kilns improved their technology and are called the "Six Old Kilns": Shigaraki (Shigaraki ware), Tamba, Bizen, Tokoname, Echizen, and Seto.

Among these, the Seto kiln in Owari Province (present day Aichi Prefecture) had a glaze technique. According to legend, Katō Shirozaemon Kagemasa (also known as Tōshirō) studied ceramic techniques in China and brought high-fired glazed ceramic to Seto in 1223. The Seto kiln primarily imitated Chinese ceramics as a substitute for the Chinese product. It developed various glazes: ash brown, iron black, feldspar white, and copper green. The wares were so widely used that Seto-mono (漢字・かな, 'product of Seto') became the generic term for ceramics in Japan. Seto kiln also produced unglazed stoneware. In the late 16th century, many Seto potters fleeing the civil wars moved to Mino Province in the Gifu Prefecture, where they produced glazed pottery: Yellow Seto (Ki-Seto), Shino, Black Seto (Seto-Guro), and Oribe ware.

=== Muromachi period ===
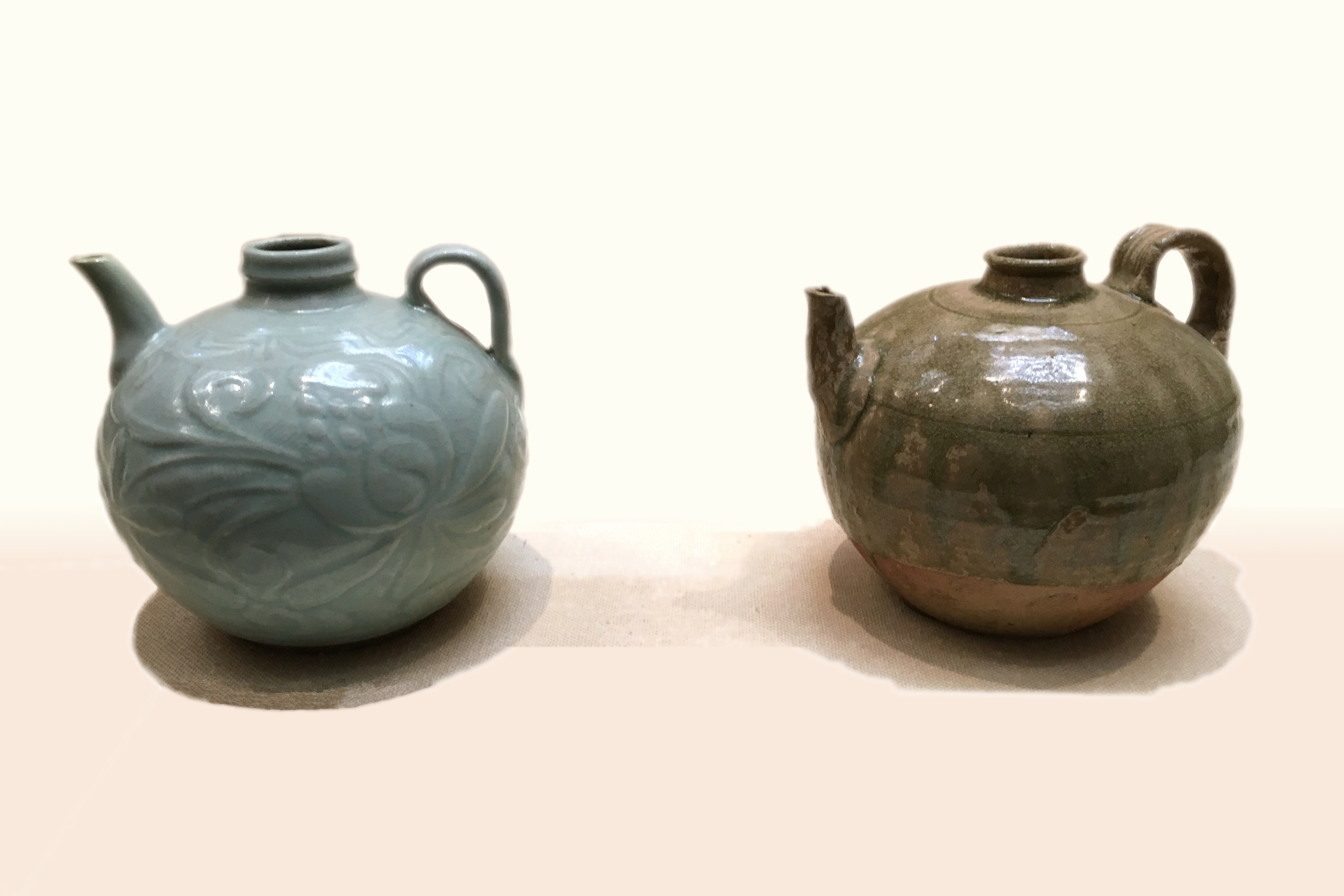
Ewers with floral design. Left: Qingbai ware, Jingdezhen kilns, southern Song dynasty, 13th century, China. Right: Seto ware, Nanboku-chō period, 14th century

According to chronicles in 1406, the Yongle Emperor (1360–1424) of the Ming dynasty bestowed ten Jian ware bowls from the Song dynasty to the shōgun Ashikaga Yoshimitsu (1358–1408), who ruled during the Muromachi period. A number of Japanese monks who traveled to monasteries in China also brought pieces back home. As they became valued for tea ceremonies, more pieces were imported from China where they became highly prized goods. Five of these vessels from the southern Song dynasty are so highly valued that they were included by the government in the list of National Treasures of Japan (crafts: others). Jian ware was later produced and further developed as tenmoku and was highly prized during tea ceremonies of this time.

=== Azuchi-Momoyama period ===
From the middle of the 11th century to the 16th century, Japan imported much Chinese celadon greenware, white porcelain, and blue-and-white ware. Japan also imported Chinese pottery as well as Korean and Vietnamese ceramics. Such Chinese ceramics (tenmoku) were regarded as sophisticated items, which the upper classes used in the tea ceremony. The Japanese also ordered custom-designed ceramics from Chinese kilns.

Highly priced imports also came from the Luzon and was called Rusun-yaki or "Luzon ware", as well as Annan from Annam, northern Vietnam.

=== Sengoku period ===
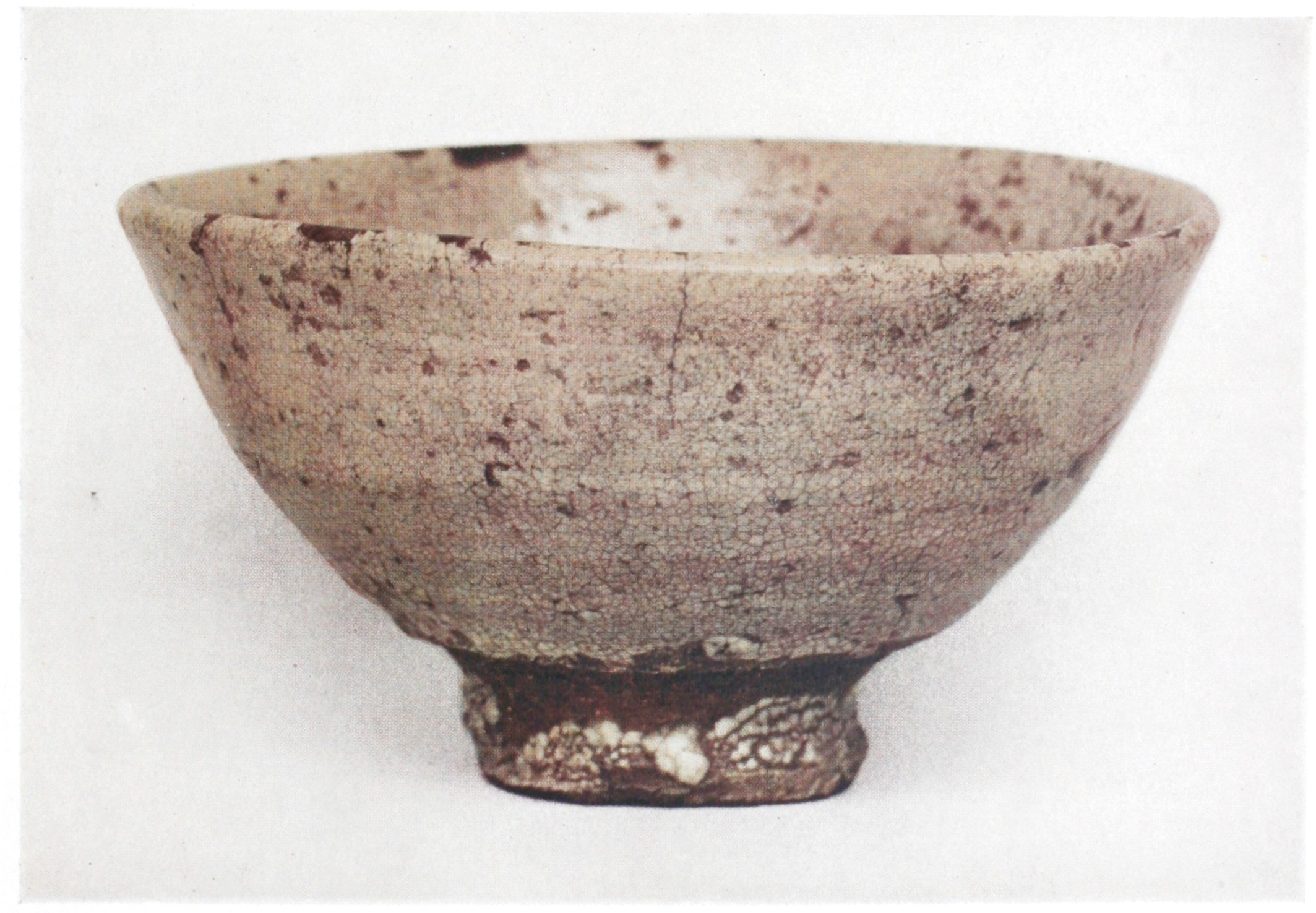
Ido chawan named "Kizaemon", an example of simple everyday ware from Korea that was highly appreciated in Japan for tea (National Treasure)

With the rise of Buddhism in the late 16th century, leading tea masters introduced a change of style and favored humble Korean tea bowls and domestic ware over sophisticated Chinese porcelain. The influential tea master Sen no Rikyū (1522–1591) turned to native Japanese styles of simple rustic pottery, often imperfect, which he admired for their "rugged spontaneity", a "decisive shift" of enormous importance for the development of Japanese pottery. The Raku family (named after the pottery rather than the other way round) supplied brown-glazed earthenware tea bowls. Mino, Bizen, Shigaraki (Shigaraki ware), Iga (similar to Shigaraki), and other domestic kilns also supplied tea utensils. The artist-potter Hon'ami Kōetsu made several tea bowls now considered masterpieces.

During Toyotomi Hideyoshi's 1592 invasion of Korea, Japanese forces brought Korean potters as slaves to Japan, According to tradition, one of the kidnapped, Yi Sam-pyeong, discovered a source of porcelain clay near Arita and was able to produce the first Japanese porcelain. These potters also brought improved kiln technology in the noborigama or rising kiln, running up a hillside and enabling temperatures of 1,400 °C (2,550 °F) to be reached. Soon the Satsuma, Hagi, Karatsu, Takatori, Agano and Arita kilns were begun.

=== Edo period ===
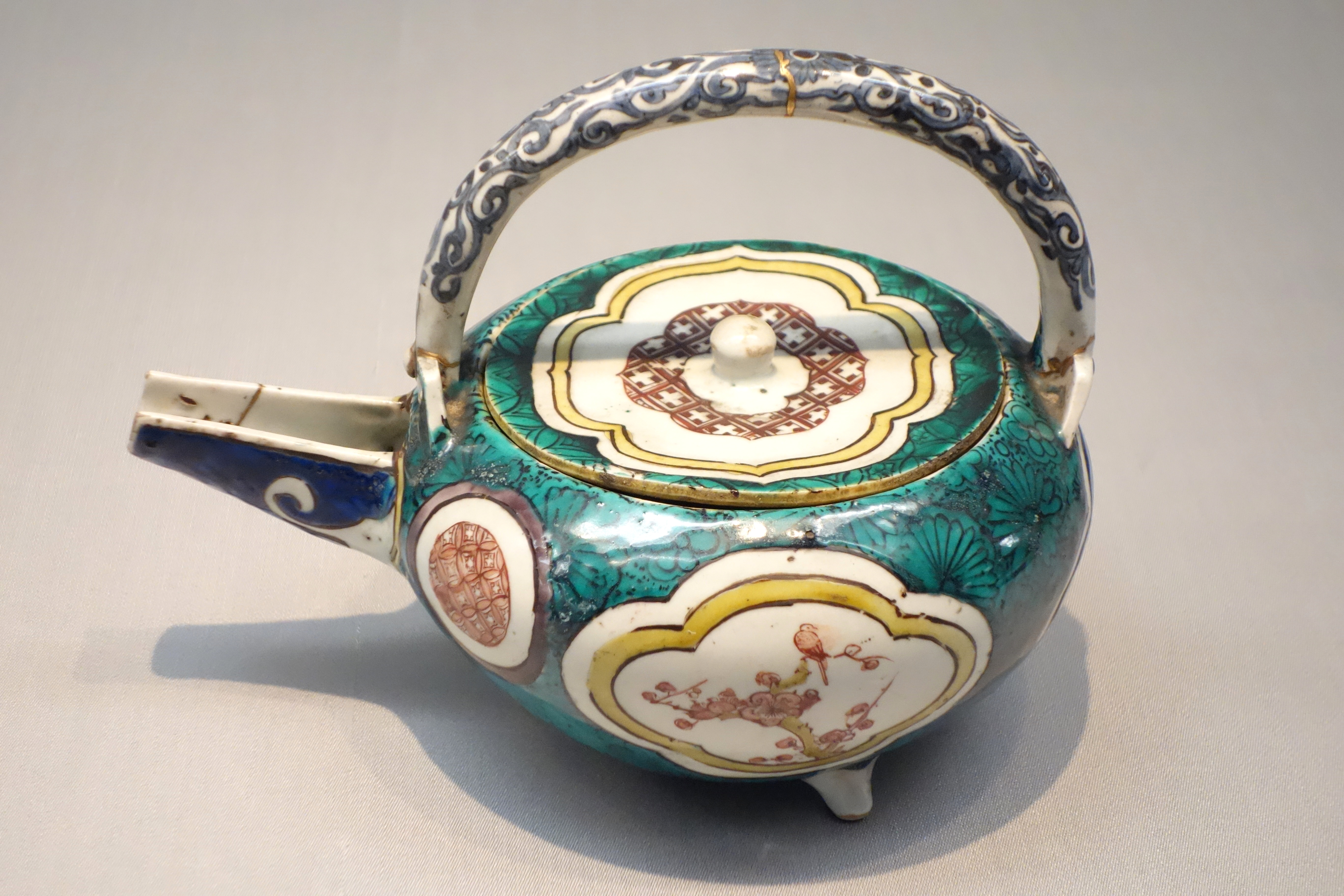
Ko-Kutani (old Kutani) five colours Iroe type sake ewer with bird and flower design in overglaze enamel, Edo period, 17th century

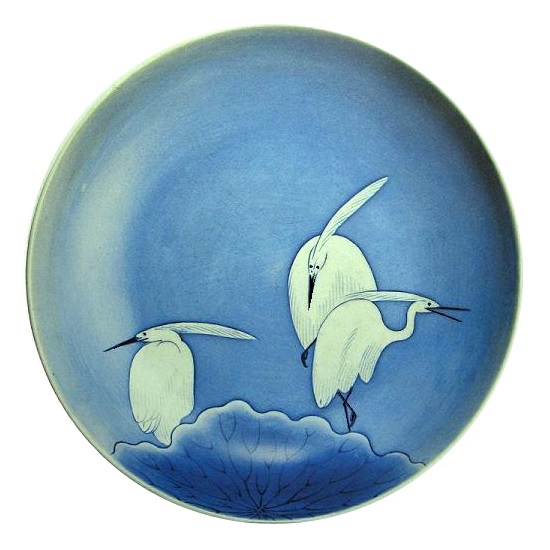
Nabeshima ware tripod large dish with heron design, underglaze blue, c. 1690–1710s (Important Cultural Property)

In the 1640s, rebellions in China and wars between the Ming dynasty and the Manchus damaged many kilns, and in 1656–1684 the new Qing dynasty government stopped trade by closing its ports. Chinese potter refugees were able to introduce refined porcelain techniques and enamel glazes to the Arita kilns. From 1658, the Dutch East India Company looked to Japan for blue-and-white porcelain to sell in Europe (see Imari porcelain). At that time, the Arita kilns like the Kakiemon kiln could not yet supply enough quality porcelain to the Dutch East India Company, but they quickly expanded their capacity. From 1659 to 1740, the Arita kilns were able to export enormous quantities of porcelain to Europe and Asia. Gradually the Chinese kilns recovered, and developed their own styles of the highly coloured enamelled wares that Europeans found so attractive, including famille rose, famille verte and the rest of that group. From about 1720 Chinese and European kilns also began to imitate the Imari enamelled style at the lower end of the market, and by about 1740 the first period of Japanese export porcelain had all but ceased. The Arita kilns also supplied domestic utensils such as the so-called Ko-Kutani enamelware.

Porcelain was also exported to China, much of which was resold by Chinese merchants to the other European "East Indies Companies" which were not allowed to trade in Japan itself. It has been suggested that the choice of such items was mainly dictated by Chinese taste, which preferred Kakiemon to "Imari" wares, accounting for a conspicuous disparity in early European collections that can be reconstructed between Dutch ones and those of other countries, such as England, France and Germany. Because Imari was the shipping port, some porcelain, for both export and domestic use, was called Ko-Imari (old Imari). The European custom has generally been to call blue and white wares "Arita" and blue, red and gold ones "Imari", though in fact both were often made in the same kilns arong Arita. In 1759 the dark red enamel pigment known as bengara became industrially available, leading to a reddish revival of the orange 1720 Ko-Imari style.

In 1675, the local Nabeshima family who ruled Arita established a personal kiln to make top-quality enamelware porcelain for the upper classes in Japan, which is called Nabeshima ware. This uses mainly decoration in traditional Japanese styles, often drawing from textiles, rather than the Chinese-derived styles of most Arita ware. Hirado ware was another kind of porcelain initially reserved for presentation as political gifts among the elite, concentrating on very fine painting in blue on an unusually fine white body, for which scroll painters were hired. These two types represented the finest porcelain produced after the export trade stalled by the 1740s. Unlike Nabeshima ware, Hirado went on to be a significant exporter in the 19th century.

During the 17th century, in Kyoto, then Japan's imperial capital, kilns produced only clear lead-glazed pottery that resembled the pottery of southern China. Among them, potter Nonomura Ninsei invented an opaque overglaze enamel and with temple patronage was able to refine many Japanese-style designs. His disciple Ogata Kenzan invented an idiosyncratic arts-and-crafts style and took Kyōyaki (Kyoto ceramics) to new heights. Their works were the models for later Kyōyaki. Although porcelain bodies were introduced to Kyōyaki by Okuda Eisen, overglazed pottery still flourished. Aoki Mokubei, Ninami Dōhachi (both disciples of Okuda Eisen) and Eiraku Hozen expanded the repertory of Kyōyaki.

In the late 18th to early 19th century, white porcelain clay was discovered in other areas of Japan and was traded domestically, and potters were allowed to move more freely. Local lords and merchants established many new kilns (e.g., Kameyama kiln and Tobe kiln) for economic profit, and old kilns such as Seto restarted as porcelain kilns. These many kilns are called "New Kilns" and they popularized porcelain in the style of the Arita kilns among the common folk.

=== Meiji period ===
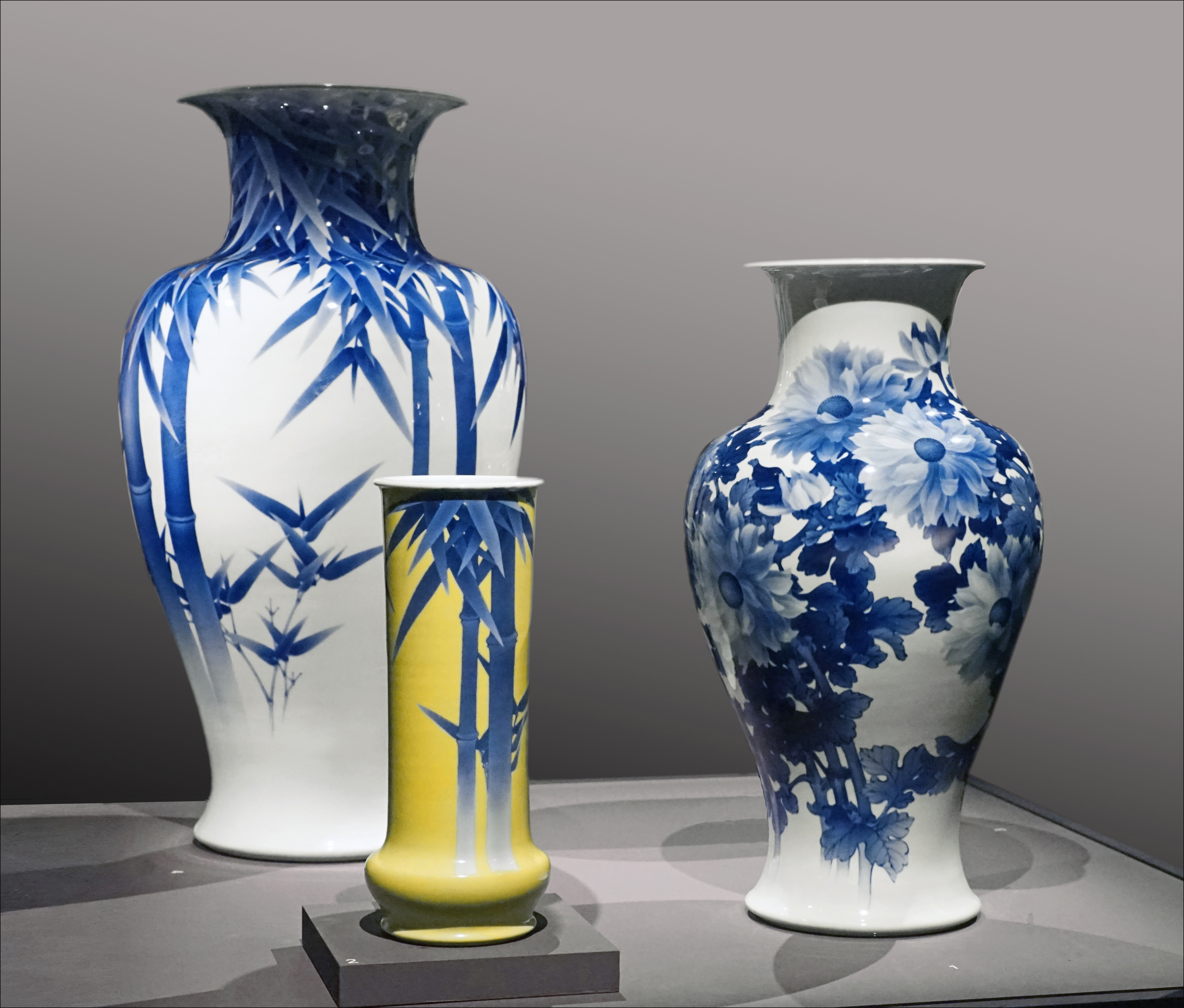
Porcelain vases by Miyagawa Kōzan I, 1905–1915

During the international openness of the Meiji period, Japanese arts and crafts had a new audience and set of influences. Traditional patrons such as the daimyō class broke away and many of the artisans lost their source of income. The government took an active interest in the art export market, promoting Japanese arts at a succession of world's fairs, beginning with the 1873 Vienna World's Fair. The Imperial Household also took an active interest in arts and crafts, appointing Imperial Household Artists and commissioning works ("presentation wares") as gifts for foreign dignitaries. Most of the works promoted internationally were in the decorative arts, including pottery.

Satsuma ware was a name originally given to pottery from Satsuma province, elaborately decorated with overglaze enamels and gilding. These wares were highly praised in the West. Seen in the West as distinctively Japanese, this style actually owed a lot to imported pigments and Western influences, and had been created with export in mind. Workshops in many cities raced to produce this style to satisfy demand from Europe and America, often producing quickly and cheaply. So the term "Satsuma ware" came to be associated not with a place of origin but with lower-quality ware created purely for export. Despite this, there were artists such as Yabu Meizan and Makuzu Kōzan who maintained the highest artistic standards while also successfully exporting. These artists won multiple awards at international exhibitions. Meizan used copper plates to create detailed designs and repeatedly transfer them to the pottery, sometimes decorating a single object with a thousand motifs.

Japan's porcelain industry was well-established at the start of the Meiji period, but the mass-produced wares were not known for their elegance. During this era, technical and artistic innovations turned porcelain into one of the most internationally successful Japanese decorative art forms. A lot of this is due to Makuzu Kōzan, known for Satsuma ware, who from the 1880s onwards introduced new technical sophistication to the decoration of porcelain, while committed to preserving traditional artistic values. During the 1890s he developed a style of decoration that combined multiple underglaze colours on each item. The technical sophistication of his underglazes increased during this decade as he continued to experiment. In the decade from 1900 to 1910 there was a substantial change in the shape and decoration of his works, reflecting Western influences. His work strongly influenced Western perceptions of Japanese design.

=== Taishō period ===
Japanese pottery strongly influenced British studio potter Bernard Leach (1887–1979), who is regarded as the "Father of British studio pottery". He lived in Japan from 1909 to 1920 during the Taishō period and became the leading western interpreter of Japanese pottery and in turn influenced a number of artists abroad.

=== Shōwa period ===
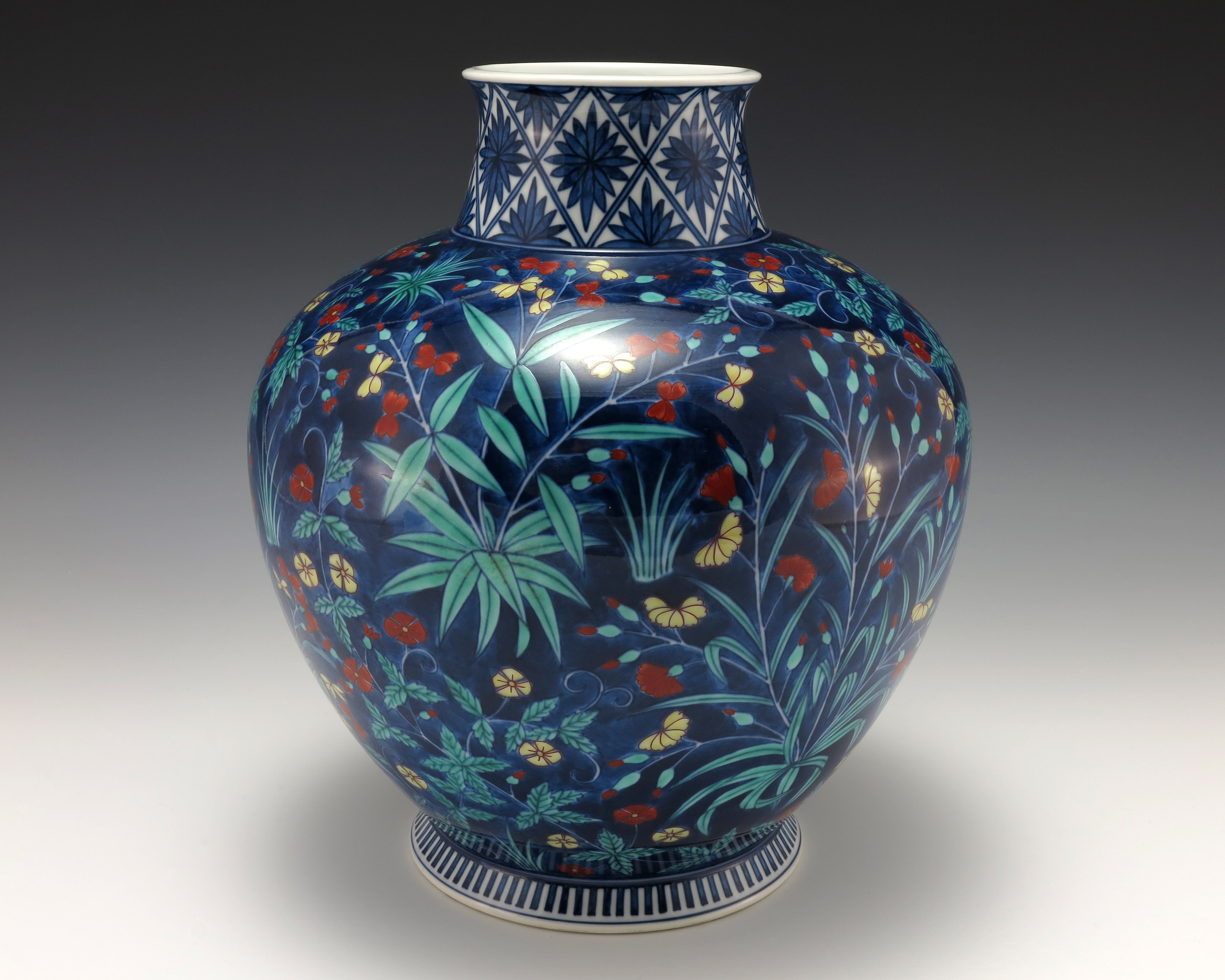
Blue porcelain vase decorated with red and yellow flowers and green foliage with geometric design around the neck and foot rim, by Imaemon Imaizumi XII (Living National Treasure). It was gifted by Emperor Shōwa and Empress Kōjun on the occasion of their first visit to the United States to President Gerald R. Ford in 1975.

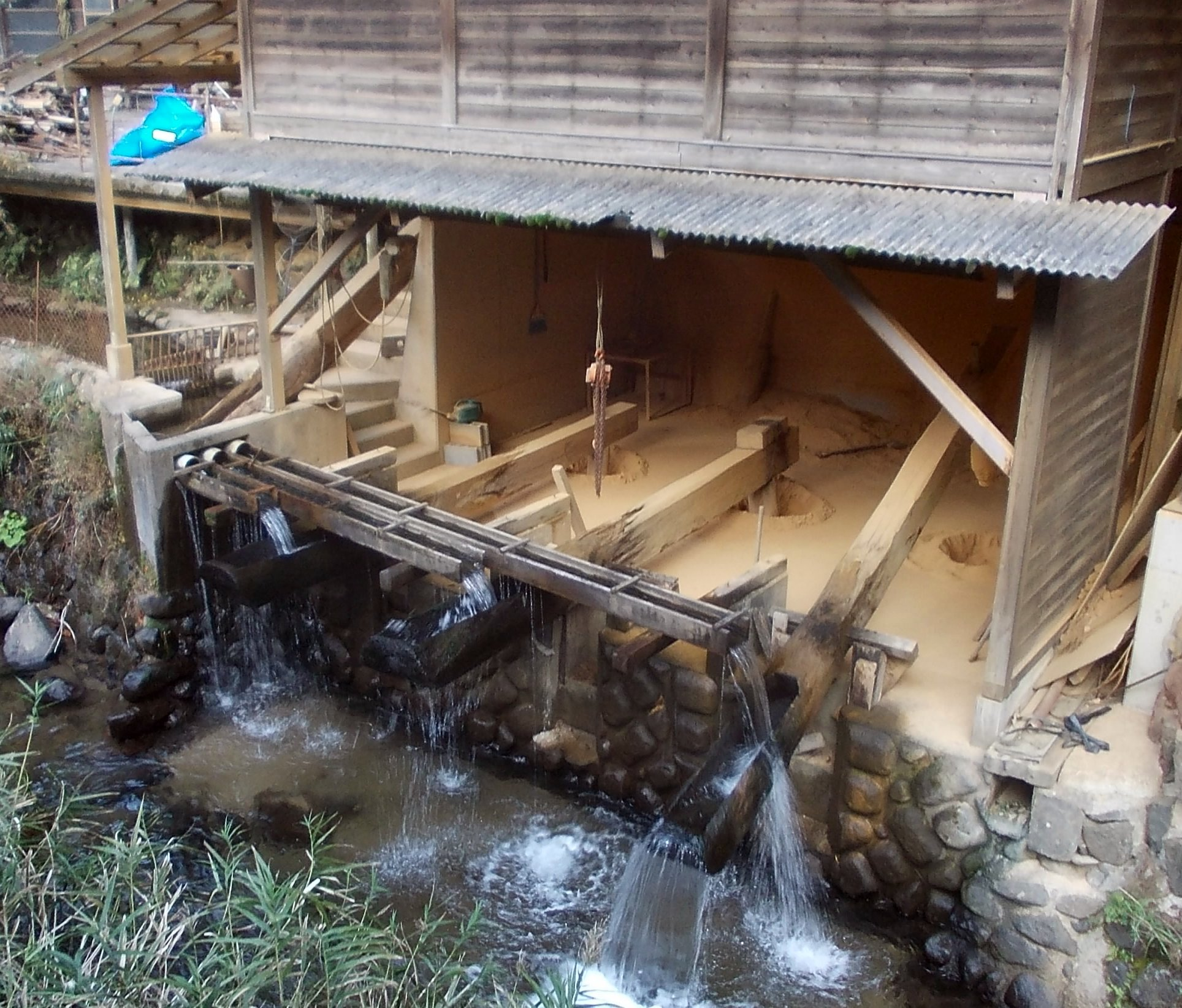
Water scoop or mill (kara-usu), used for the preparation of the clay for Onta ware, an Intangible Cultural Property

During the early Shōwa period, the folk art movement mingei (民芸) developed, starting in the late 1920s and 1930s. Its founding father was Yanagi Sōetsu (1889–1961). Yanagi was deeply moved by the quiet beauty of utilitarian wares made by common people—particularly simple, unpretentious pots and tools from the Edo and Meiji periods—that were rapidly vanishing in Japan’s increasingly urban and mechanized society. He rescued lowly pots used by commoners in the Edo and Meiji period that were disappearing in rapidly urbanizing Japan. Shōji Hamada (1894–1978) was a potter who was a major figure of the mingei movement, establishing the town of Mashiko as a renowned centre for Mashiko ware. Another influential potter in this movement was Kawai Kanjirō (1890–1966) and Tatsuzō Shimaoka (1919–2007). Shimaoka became renowned for his innovative jōmon zogan (rope-impressed inlay) technique, which fused modern creativity with ancient aesthetics, earning him the status of Living National Treasure in 1996. These artists studied traditional glazing techniques to preserve native wares in danger of disappearing, blending folk traditions with a personal spiritual sensibility, believing that beauty should be found in the act of making, not just in the final form. Both men embraced Yanagi’s vision, not merely as craftspeople but as artist-philosophers committed to preserving Japan’s cultural heritage. A central goal of these artists was to study, preserve, and revive traditional glazing and firing techniques, many of which were in danger of disappearing as Japan modernized. Their efforts were not simply nostalgic but rooted in a belief that handcrafted, everyday objects carried a deep connection to place, purpose, and human touch.

However, one of the most critical and challenging periods for the mingei movement came during the Pacific War (1941–1945). With the nation's resources redirected toward the war effort, artisanal production was severely curtailed. Materials such as clay, fuel, and glazes became scarce, and artistic practice gave way to utilitarian demands. Pottery workshops were shuttered or repurposed, and the market for handmade wares all but collapsed. Yet, despite these obstacles, the ideals of mingeiendured. In the post-war years, the movement experienced a resurgence, thanks in large part to the unwavering commitment of its key figures and the international recognition they began to receive.

=== Heisei period to present ===
A number of institutions came under the aegis of the Cultural Properties Protection Division.

The kilns at Tamba, overlooking Kobe, continued to produce the daily wares used in the Tokugawa period, while adding modern shapes. Most of the village wares were made anonymously by local potters for utilitarian purposes. Local styles, whether native or imported, tended to be continued without alteration into the present. In Kyūshū, kilns set up by Korean potters in the 16th century, such as at Koishiwara, Fukuoka and its offshoot at Onta ware, perpetuated 16th-century Korean peasant wares. In Okinawa, the production of village ware continued under several leading masters, with Jiro Kinjo honored as a ningen kokuho (人間国宝, lit. 'living cultural treasures', officially a Preserver of Important Intangible Cultural Properties).

The modern potters operate in Shiga, Iga, Karatsu, Hagi, and Bizen. Yamamoto Masao (Toushuu) of Bizen and Miwa Kyusetsu of Hagi were designated ningen kokuho. Only a half-dozen potters had been so honored by 1989, either as representatives of famous kiln wares or as creators of superlative techniques in glazing or decoration; two groups were designated for preserving the wares of distinguished ancient kilns.

In the old capital of Kyoto, the Raku family continued to produce the rough tea bowls that had so delighted Hideyoshi. At Mino, potters continued to reconstruct the classic formulas of Momoyama period Seto-type tea wares of Mino, such as the Oribe ware copper-green glaze and Shino ware's prized milky glaze. Artist potters experimented at the Kyoto and Tokyo arts universities to recreate traditional porcelain and its decorations under such ceramic teachers as Fujimoto Yoshimichi, a ningen kokuho. Ancient porcelain kilns around Arita in Kyūshū were still maintained by the lineage of Sakaida Kakiemon XIV and Imaizumi Imaemon XIII, hereditary porcelain makers to the Nabeshima clan; both were heads of groups designated mukei bunkazai (無形文化財; see Kakiemon and Imari porcelain).

British artist Lucie Rie (1902–1995) was influenced by Japanese pottery and Bernard Leach, and was also appreciated in Japan with a number of exhibitions. British artist Edmund de Waal (b. 1964) studied Leach and spent a number of years in Japan studying mingei style. Thomas Bezanson from Canada was influenced by it.

In contrast, by the end of the 1980s, many studio potters no longer worked at major or ancient kilns but were making classic wares in various parts of Japan. In Tokyo, a notable example is Tsuji Seimei, who brought his clay from Shiga but potted in the Tokyo area. A number of artists were engaged in reconstructing Chinese styles of decoration or glazes, especially the blue-green celadon and the watery-green qingbai. One of the most beloved Chinese glazes in Japan is the chocolate-brown tenmoku glaze that covered the peasant tea bowls brought back from southern Song China (in the twelfth and thirteenth centuries) by Zen monks. For their Japanese users, these chocolate-brown wares embodied the Zen aesthetic of wabi (rustic simplicity). In the United States, an example of the use of tenmoku glazes are pots thrown by Japanese-born artist Hideaki Miyamura.

== Raw materials ==
Raw materials are chosen largely based on local availability. There is an abundance of many basic in Japan. Due to naturally occurring kaolin deposits, many clays are found in Kyushu. Kilns were traditionally built at the sites of clay deposits, and most studio potters still use local clays, having developed a range of glazes and decoration techniques especially suited to that clay. Raw materials found in the Japanese archipelago range from those suitable for earthenwares to more refractory kaolins. From the Jōmon period to the Yayoi period, Japanese potters relied on high plastic iron-bearing shale and alluvial clays. Organic materials appear in much of the early Jōmon period work, but sand or crushed stone predominates thereafter.

Further refinements came about under the Chinese influence in the 8th and 9th centuries AD, when creators of Nara three-color wares and Heian ash glazed wares sought out white, refractory clays and enhanced their fineness through levigation.

== Traditional shaping methods ==
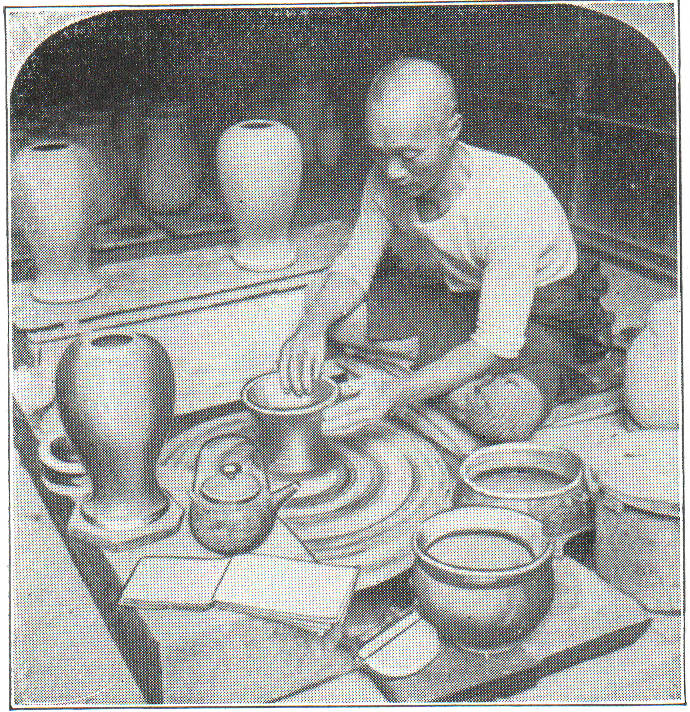
Potter at his wheel (1914)

The earliest pieces were made by pressing the clay into shape. This method continued to be employed after the invention of the wheel, such as when producing Rengetsu ware. Coiled methods developed in the Jōmon period. Production by kneading and cutting slabs developed later, for example, for haniwa clay figures.

=== Coil and throw ===
At Koishibara, Onda, and Tamba, large bowls and jars are first roughly coil-built on the wheel, then shaped by throwing, in what is known as the "coil and throw technique". The preliminary steps are the same as for coil building, after which the rough form is lubricated with slip and shaped between the potter's hands as the wheel revolves. The process dates back 360 years to a Korean technique brought to Japan following Hideyoshi's invasion of Korea.

=== Tools ===
Tools for shaping pottery were generally fashioned out of bamboo or other types of wood. While most of the tools used are similar to those used in other pottery traditions, some are unique to Japan.

- Gyūbera or "cows' tongues" are long sled-shaped bamboo ribs used to compress the bottoms and shape the sides of straight-sided bowls. They are a traditional tool from Arita, Kyushu.
- Marugote are round, shallow clam shell-shaped bamboo ribs used to shape the sides of curved bowls. They can also be used to compress the bottoms of thrown forms.
- Dango, similar to wooden ribs, are leaf-shaped bamboo ribs used to shape and smooth the surfaces of a pot.
- Takebera are bamboo trimming and modeling "knives" available in several different shapes for carving, cleaning up wet pots, cutting, and for producing sgraffito effects.
- Tonbo, "dragonflies", are the functional equivalent of Western calipers with an added feature. Suspended from a takebera or balanced on the rim of a pot, these delicate bamboo tools are used for measuring both the diameter and the depth of thrown forms.
- Yumi are wire and bamboo trimming harps that double as a fluting tool. They are used to cut off uneven or torn rims as well as to facet leather-hard forms.
- Tsurunokubi, "cranes' necks", are s-curved Japanese wooden throwing sticks used to shape the interiors of narrow-necked pieces such as bottles and certain vases.
- Kanna are cutting, carving and incising tools made of iron and used to trim pieces, for carving, sgraffito and for scraping off excess glaze.
- A tsuchikaki is a large looped ribbon tool made of iron that can be used for trimming as well as carving.
- An umakaki is a trimming harp used to level flat, wide surfaces, such as the bottom of a shallow dish or plate.
- Kushi are not strictly throwing tools; these combs are used to score a minimum of two decorative parallel lines on pot surfaces. The largest combs have about 20 teeth.
- A take bon bon is also not a throwing tool, but a Japanese slip-trailer. A take bon bon is a high-capacity bamboo bottle with a spout from which slip and glaze can be poured out in a steady, controlled stream so the potter can "draw" with it.

== Wares ==
Hundreds of different wares and styles have existed throughout its history. The most historic and well-known ones have received recognition from the government. For more information see the list of Japanese ceramics sites.

Name	Kanji	Traditional Sites	Notes	Example image
Agano ware	上野焼	Fukuchi, Tagawa District, Fukuoka		Agano ware sake bottle (tokkuri), Edo period, mid-19th century
Aizuhongō ware	会津本郷焼			Aizuhongō ware sake bottle (tokkuri), Edo period, mid-19th century
Akahada ware	赤膚焼			Akahada ware double-spouted sake decanter, Edo period, early 19th century
Akazu ware	赤津焼			
Amakusa pottery	天草陶磁器	Amakusa, Kumamoto		
Arita ware	有田焼	Arita, Saga	The main source of Japanese export porcelain from the mid 17th-century onwards. Production began by Korean potters at the beginning of the Edo period. A multitude of kilns produced a variety of styles, including Imari ware and Nabeshima ware, and most early pieces in the Kakiemon style of decoration.	Arita ware incense burner (kōro) with domestic scenes, late Edo period/early Meiji period, 19th century
Asahi ware	朝日焼			Asahi stoneware tea bowl with wood-ash glaze, Edo period, 18th century
Banko ware	萬古焼	Mie Prefecture	Most are teacups, teapots, flower vases, and sake vessels. Believed to have originated in the 19th century.	Banko ware Okame female figurine, Edo period, 19th century
Bizen ware	備前焼	Bizen Province	Also called Inbe ware. A reddish-brown long-fired stoneware, which is believed to have originated in the 6th century. One of the first medieval utilitarian wares to be taken up for use in the tea ceremony, and promoted to the status of art pottery.	Bizen ware flower vase tabimakura (portable pillow), Edo period, 17th century
Echizen ware	越前焼			Echizen ware sake bottle (tokkuri), Momoyama period, late 16th century
Hagi ware	萩焼	Hagi, Yamaguchi	Since it is burned at a relatively low temperature, it is fragile and transmits the warmth of its contents quickly.	Hagi ware tea bowl (chawan), by Tamamura Shogetsu
Hasami ware	波佐見焼			
Iga ware	伊賀焼			Iga ware flower vase with katamimi handles, Edo period, 17th century
Iwami ware	石見焼			
Izushi ware	出石焼			
Karatsu ware	唐津焼	Karatsu, Saga	The most produced pottery in western Japan. Believed to have started in the 16th century.	Karatsu ware jar with bush clover design, underglaze iron-brown, Egaratsu type, stoneware, Hizen, late Azuchi-Momoyama period/early Edo period, 1590-1610s
Kasama ware	笠間焼			
Kirigome ware	切込焼	Miyazaki, Miyagi		Kirigome ware dishes with landscape design in underglaze blue, Edo period, 19th century
Kiyomizu ware	清水焼	Kiyomizu, Kyoto	A subcategory of Kyō ware	Ko-Kiyomizu (old Kiyomizu) lidded brazier (te-aburi) with paulownia and geometric design, Edo period, 18th century
Koishiwara ware	小石原焼	Fukuoka Prefecture	Most are teacups, teapots, flower vases, and sake vessels, and as a result of the folk art movement, practical items for everyday household use. Originated by a Korean potter in the 16th century.	
Kosobe ware	古曽部焼			
Kutani ware	九谷焼	Ishikawa Prefecture		Ko-Kutani porcelain four colours Aote type plate with flower design in enamel, late 17th century, Edo period
Kyō ware	京焼	Kyoto		Kyō stoneware tiered food box with overglaze enamels, Edo period, 18th century
Mashiko ware	益子焼			Ko-Mashiko stoneware teapot mado-e dobin ("window picture"), Taisho/Showa era, c. 1915–35
Mikawachi ware	三川内焼			Mikawachi ware brush rest in the form of boys with a snowball, porcelain with underglaze blue, Edo period, 1800–1830
Mino ware	美濃焼	Mino Province	Includes Shino ware, Oribe ware, Setoguro ware, and Ki-Seto ware.	Mino ware cornered bowl in Oribe type, Edo period, 17th century
Mumyōi ware	無名異焼			
Ōborisōma ware	大堀相馬焼	Fukushima Prefecture	Image of a horse (uma or koma), which is very popular in this area, is the main pattern. Therefore, it is sometimes called Sōmakoma ware.	Sōma ware gourd-shaped bottle, horse design. Edo period, 18–19th century.
Onta ware	小鹿田焼	Onta, Ōita	Traditionalist ware produced by a small village community without electricity. Mostly simply but elegantly decorated slipware, in a style going back to the 18th century.	Onta ware sake bottle (tokkuri), 19th century, Edo period
Ōtani ware	大谷焼	Naruto, Tokushima	A large type of pottery	
Raku ware	楽焼		A technique and style practised all over Japan, and now the world. Typically, vessels are hand-thrown without using a wheel, giving a simple and rather rough shape, and fired at low temperatures before being cooled in the open air. In modern periods combustible material is generally placed in the kiln, reacting unpredictably with the glaze pigments. There is a proverb of the hierarchy of ceramic styles used for tea ceremony: 'First Raku, second Hagi, third Karatsu.'	Black Raku ware chawan tea bowl, Edo period, 19th century
Satsuma ware	薩摩焼	Satsuma Province	Earthenware, originally a local industry of plain vessels started by Korean potters about 1600. From the 19th century a term for a style of highly decorated ware produced in many areas, purely for export to the West.	Satsuma ware bowl with a multitude of women, Meiji period, c. 1904, by Yabu Meizan
Seto ware	瀬戸焼	Seto, Aichi	The most produced Japanese pottery in Japan. Sometimes, the term Seto-yaki (or Seto-mono) stands for all Japanese pottery. Includes Ofukei ware.	Kiseto water jar, clay covered with glaze and iron-brown splashes and black lacquer cover, Momoyama or Edo period, 17th century
Shigaraki ware	信楽焼	Shiga Prefecture	One of the oldest styles in Japan. Famous for tanuki pottery pieces.	Shigaraki ware small jar, Muromachi period, 15th century
Shitoro ware	志戸呂焼			
Shōdai ware	小代焼	Arao, Kumamoto		Bamboo-shaped sake bottle (tokkuri), stoneware with brown and white glazes, Edo period, late 17th-early 18th century
Takatori ware	高取焼			
Tamba ware	丹波立杭焼	Hyōgo Prefecture	Also called Tatekui ware. One of the six oldest kinds in Japan.	Tamba ware jar with three lugs, end of Heian period, 12th century. Important Cultural Property
Tobe ware	砥部焼	Ehime Prefecture	Most are thick porcelain table ware with blue cobalt paintings.	Tobe ware covered jar, grape and squirrel design, blue underglaze. Edo period, 19th century
Tokoname ware	常滑焼	Tokoname, Aichi	Most are flower vases, rice bowls, or teacups.	Tokoname stoneware coil-built with ash glaze, Kamakura period, 14th century
Tsuboya ware	壺屋焼	Tsuboya, Naha	A form of Ryukyuan pottery. Most are thick porcelain table ware with blue cobalt paintings.	Tsuboya ware wine bottle with spout, second Shō Dynasty, Ryukyu Kingdom, 19th century
Zeze ware	膳所焼	Ōtsu, former Zeze domain	Most are thick porcelain table ware with blue cobalt paintings.	

== Museums and collections ==
A number of museums in Japan are dedicated entirely only to ceramics. Amongst the most well-known ones are the Aichi Prefectural Ceramic Museum close to Nagoya, the Arita Porcelain Park, the Fukuoka Oriental Ceramics Museum, the Kyushu Ceramic Museum, the Noritake Garden, the Museum of Oriental Ceramics, Osaka, the Okayama Prefectural Bizen Ceramics Museum, and the Ōtsuka Museum of Art. Public museums such as the Kyushu National Museum, Kyoto National Museum, Nara National Museum, Tokyo National Museum and Ishikawa Prefectural Museum of Art have important ceramic collections. A number of private museums also have important items such as the MOA Museum of Art, Mitsui Memorial Museum, Seikadō Bunko Art Museum, Fujita Art Museum and Kubosō Memorial Museum of Arts, Izumi. A number of important ceramic items are also owned and kept in various temples in Japan such as the Ryūkō-in, Kohō-an and Shōkoku-ji, however the items are not exhibited publicly.

Most ceramic museums around the world have collections of Japanese pottery, many very extensive. Japanese modern ceramic works are often very sought-after and expensive. Apart from traditional styles art and studio pottery in contemporary art styles are made for the international market.

== See also ==
- Japanese craft
- Japanese art
- Chinese ceramics
- Korean pottery and porcelain
- Kintsugi
- List of National Treasures of Japan (crafts: others)
- Tokanabe
- List of Traditional Crafts of Japan
