= Chun Wen Wang =

Taiwanese-American ceramic artist

- 王俊文
- Born: 1956 (age 69–70); Taipei, Taiwan
- Citizenship: USA
- Known for: Father of liquid in liquid separated glaze, Re-creating the iron-crystalline glazes of the Song dynasty

Chun Wen Wang (王俊文, Wáng Jùn Wén, born 1956) is a Taiwanese-American ceramic artist living in San Diego, California, in the United States. He primarily specializes in high-fired temperature liquid-in-liquid saturated glazes.

== Early life and education ==
Chun Wen Wang was born in Taipei, Taiwan, in 1956. He graduated from Hsing Wu University in 1978 and immigrated to the United States in 1982. He studied and worked at San Diego Mesa College from 1988 to 2000. From 1992 to 1996, Wang also researched ancient Chinese glazes in the Department of Conservation Science at the National Palace Museum in Taipei, Taiwan.

== Career ==
In 1997, Wang's work of re-creating the elusive “liquid in liquid” iron-crystalline glazes of the Song dynasty was published in the April 1997 issue of Ceramics Monthly, the authoritative and largest-circulated studio ceramics magazine. He received accolades from Ceramics Monthly with a portrayal on the front cover. In addition, Wang has been honored with a gold medal from the National Museum of History in Taipei, Taiwan for his outstanding contributions to international ceramic research and named the "father of liquid in liquid separated glaze". Furthermore, he is credited with uncovering the secret of the Song dynasty Jian black glaze along with the development of seven different kinds of unprecedented separated glaze colors.

Wang's expertise lies in his understanding of glazes under high-fired temperatures (pyrometric cone 10, 11). Since 1993, his focus has been on the Jian ware and Tenmoku youhen glazes. In his two books, Beyond the Tian Mu Shan and The Glaze from a Merciful Heart, Wang showcases his signature glazes reminiscent of the Tenmoku Youhen style with the likes of iridescent black pearl rainbow, red oil spot with gold rings, and yellow and orange red oil spots. Using American techniques and technology in tandem with his personal research, Wang continues to push and re-innovate the boundaries of modern glaze research using the Song dynasty ceramics as inspiration.

Wang's work is included in more than 20 eminent museum collections worldwide including notable museums such as the British Museum, the Smithsonian American Art Museum, the Cleveland Museum of Art, the University of Michigan Museum of Art, the American Museum of Ceramic Art, the Asian Art Museum, the Los Angeles County Museum of Art, and the National Museum of History in Taiwan.

In addition, Wang has been invited to many multiple prestigious museums for exhibitions. In the past, the National Museum of History held eight domestic R.O.C. Ceramics Biennial Exhibitions between 1986 and 1998 to "promote modern ceramics." In the year 2000, Wang was invited by the National Museum of History to the International Biennial Exhibition of Ceramic Art as the American representative.

His first international solo exhibition also took place at the National Museum of History in Taiwan from October 9, 2007, to November 11, 2007. This time, Wang held a solo exhibition with the intent of "expanding the domestic arts field of vision, encouraging creativity, and founding a new scene for modern Taiwan ceramics." He has also held a solo exhibition, titled The Secret of the Song Dynasty, as part of the American Museum of Ceramic Art's Iron Saga exhibition running from April 7, 2005, to May 7, 2005.

== Reception ==
David Armstrong, the founder of the American Museum of Ceramic Art, stated that "there is one man, Chun Wen Wang, who has achieved spectacular results where others have failed" when it comes to reproducing the ceramic works of the Song dynasty. Furthermore, in Armstrong's words, Chun Wen Wang is "a master of the ceramic medium", and his artworks are not just a replication of the ancient Song dynasty glazes but a development of "a series of glazes unlike any others."

== Sources ==
- Wang, Chun Wen (2001). Beyond the Tien Mu Shan: The Ceramic Art of Chun Wen Wang (in English and Chinese). Taipei, Taiwan R.O.C.: Wushing Books. ISBN 978-957-8964-16-7.
- Wang, Chun Wen (2007). The Glaze from a Merciful Heart: The Ceramic Art of Chun Wen Wang (in English and Chinese). Taipei, Taiwan R.O.C.: Huang Yung-Chuan. ISBN 978-986-01-1043-2.
- Hachigian, J. (1997, April). Wang Chun Wen. Ceramics Monthly, 59–62.
