= Jizhou ware =

Pottery from Jiangxi, China

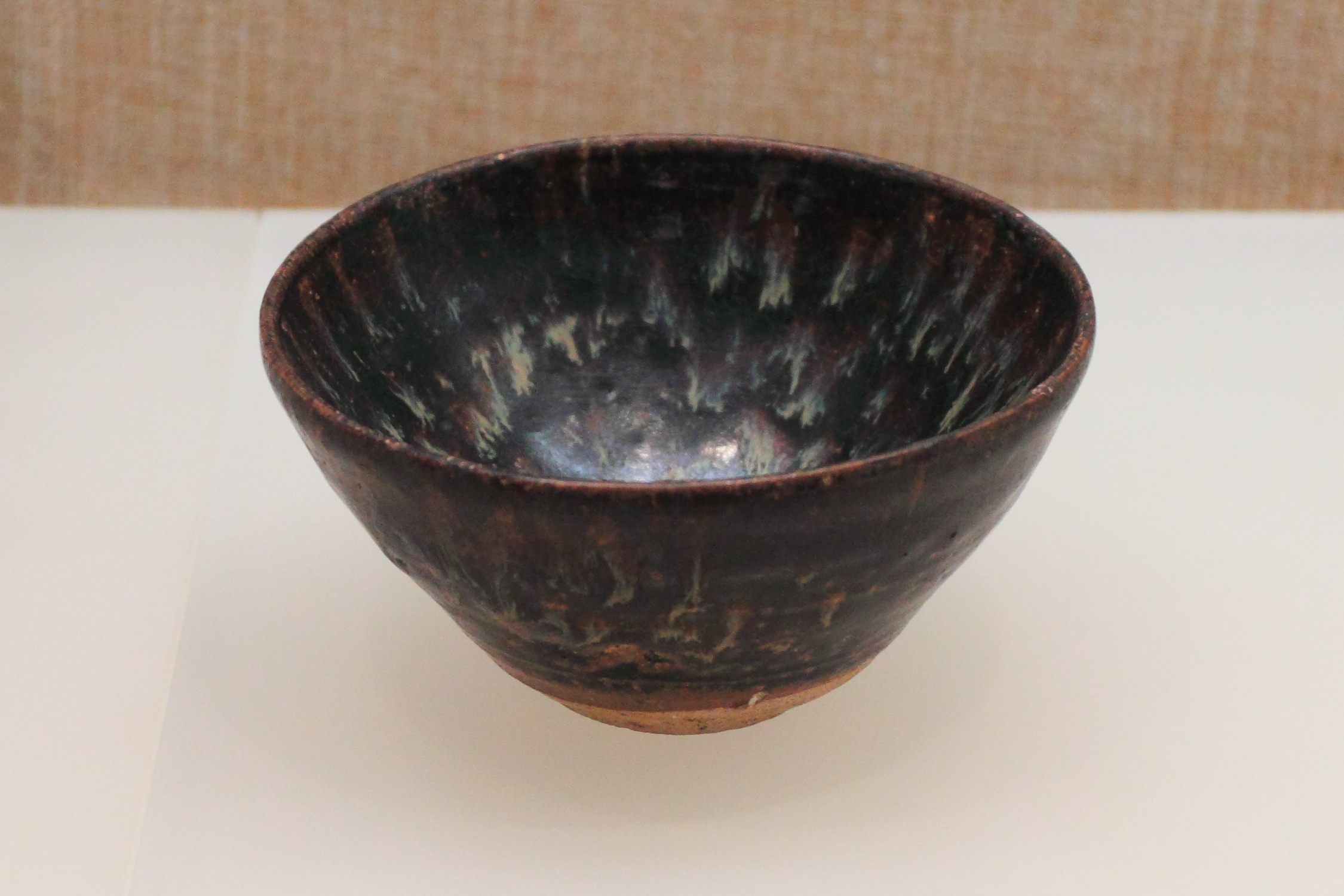
Jizhou tea bowl with "tortoiseshell" glaze effect

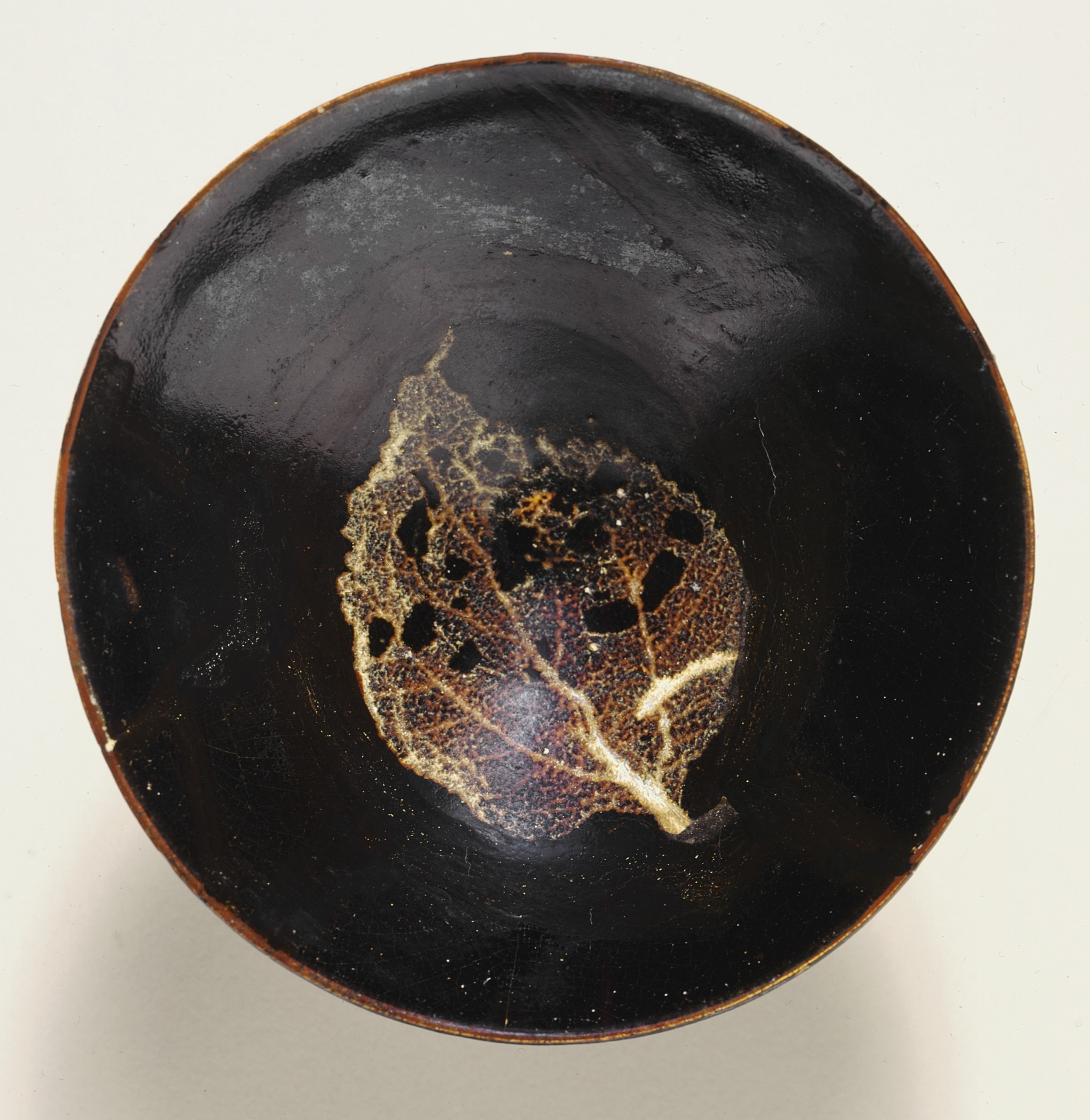
Tea bowl (from above), wheel-thrown stoneware with natural leaf resist decoration and brown glaze, late southern Song dynasty, about 1200–1279

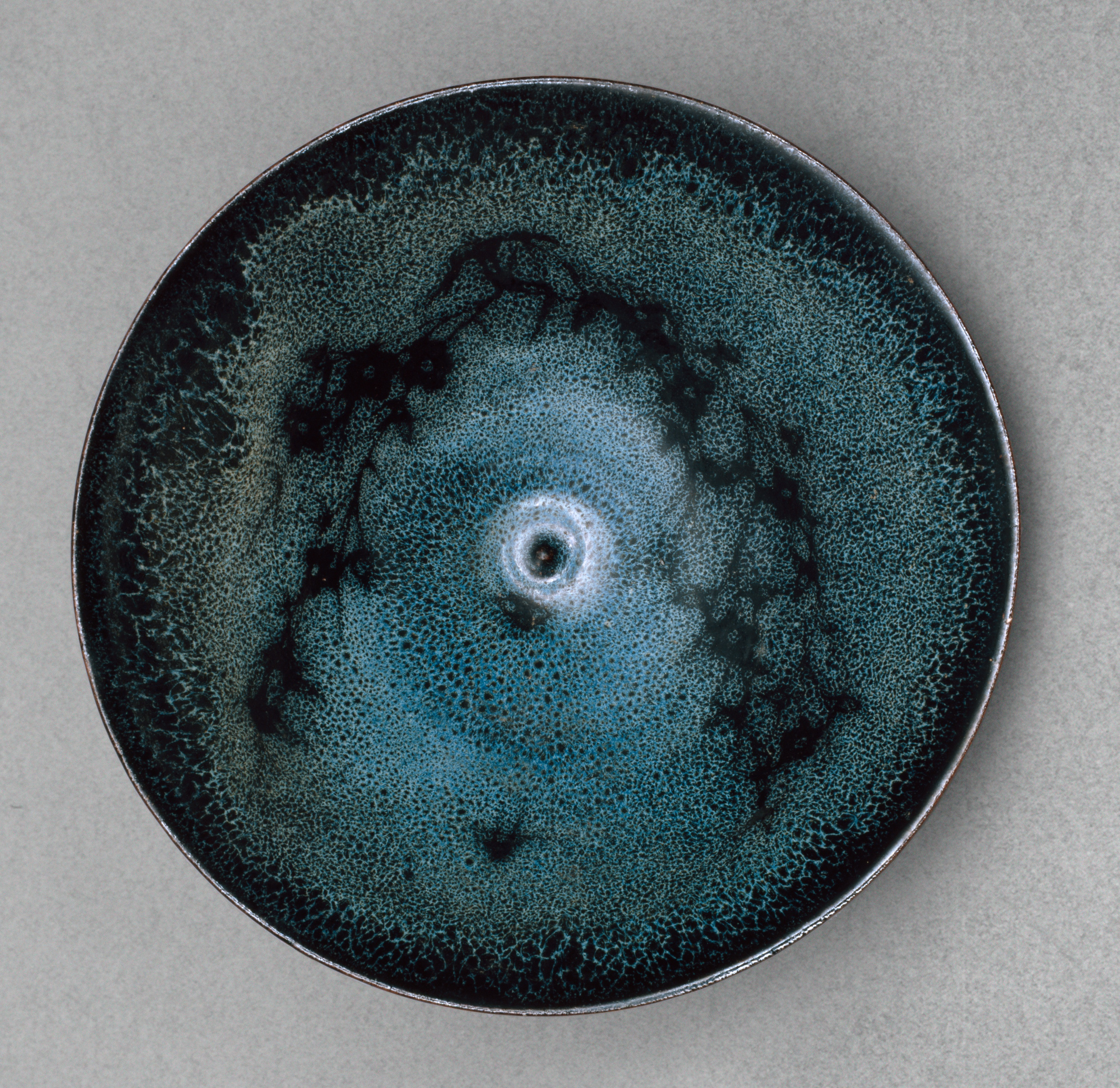
Conical bowl with blossoming plum. Glazed light gray stoneware with reserved papercut decoration. Southern Song period (1127–1279). Art Institute of Chicago

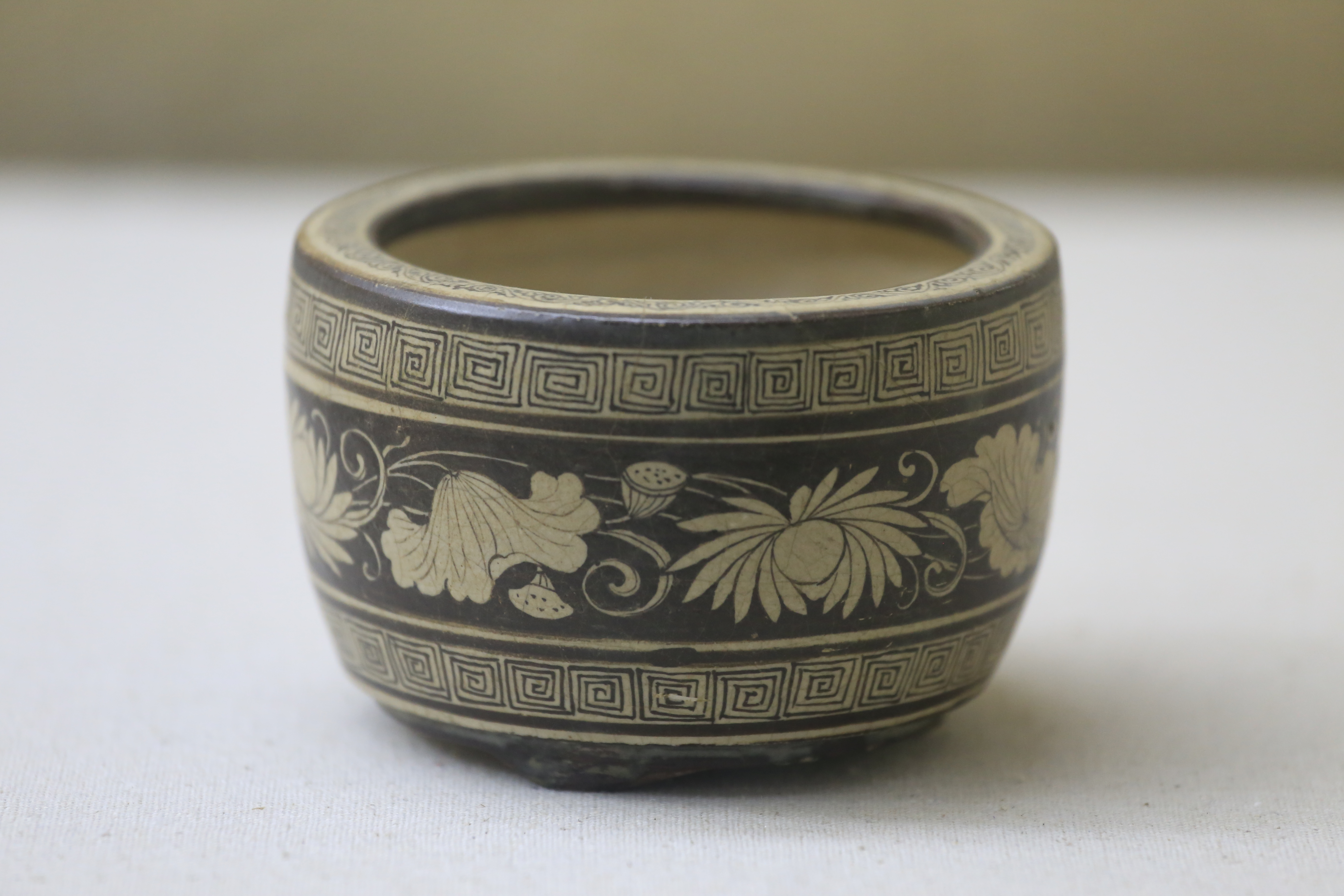
Brown and white underglaze painting

Jizhou ware or Chi-chou ware (Chinese: 吉州窯; pinyin: Jízhōu yáo; Wade–Giles: Chi-chou yao) is Chinese pottery from Jiangxi province in southern China; the Jizhou kilns made a number of different types of wares over the five centuries of production. The best known wares are simple shapes in stoneware, with a strong emphasis on subtle effects in the dark glazes, comparable to Jian ware, but often combined with other decorative effects. In the Song dynasty they achieved a high prestige, especially among Buddhist monks and in relation to tea-drinking. The wares often use leaves or paper cutouts to create resist patterns in the glaze, by leaving parts of the body untouched.

In the Yuan dynasty Jizhou also produced Qingbai ware, as well as brown and white slip-painted wares that borrowed their technique from Cizhou ware, popular wares produced at many sites in north China, and may have been significant in influencing the start of blue and white pottery in Jingdezhen ware, from relatively nearby.

Production seems to have begun in the late Tang dynasty or under the Five Dynasties, and continued until the Yuan dynasty. Production seems to have ended suddenly in the 14th century, for reasons that are not yet clear. In a ranking of Chinese wares from 1388, in the Essential Criteria of Antiquities, Jizhou ware is listed in ninth place, above Longquan celadon, which was falling from fashion by then.

== Characteristics ==
Jizhou ware was known for a "tortoiseshell glaze" (玳瑁釉; dàimàoyòu), alone or in combination with other types of decoration. The leaf and paper cut-outs were left in place, and burnt away in the kiln during firing. Paper cut-outs featured "auspicious characters" or simple floral patterns, often spread around the sides of the bowl. The leaves were more often placed in the centre of the bowl, and often only the skeleton of the leaf is seen. The technique seems to have been to soak a real leaf in the glaze mixture, then place it on the vessel, where the leaf itself burnt away in firing. Another, rather rare, resist glaze effect is called "leopard-spot". "Deer-spot" decoration, with rows of light brown spots with a white centre, was painted into place.

The bodies of the wares seem to have been made entirely from the local low-grade petunse, giving a light buff colour to the body. The painted wares are under a transparent glaze, and the designs can be elaborate and finely-executed. Common motifs include geometric patterns including basket-weave, floral patterns, especially tight "fronded spirals", and also breaking-waves. All of these, together with handles in the form of fishes with scales and fins, are found on a Yuan dynasty vase in the British Museum, which borrows both its shape and decoration from metalware.

== Kiln site ==
It was produced in several kilns at Yonghe Town, Ji'an County, Jiangxi, called the Jizhou Kiln. The historic site has been classified by the government as a major national historical and cultural sites in Jiangxi.

Excavations at the site revealed large numbers of discarded fragments of Qingbai, an early blueish-white porcelain, below the layers with brown and white painted wares. Jizhou was clearly one of the secondary sites where this was produced, with Jingdezhen the main centre.
