= Resist =

Protection used in manufacturing and art

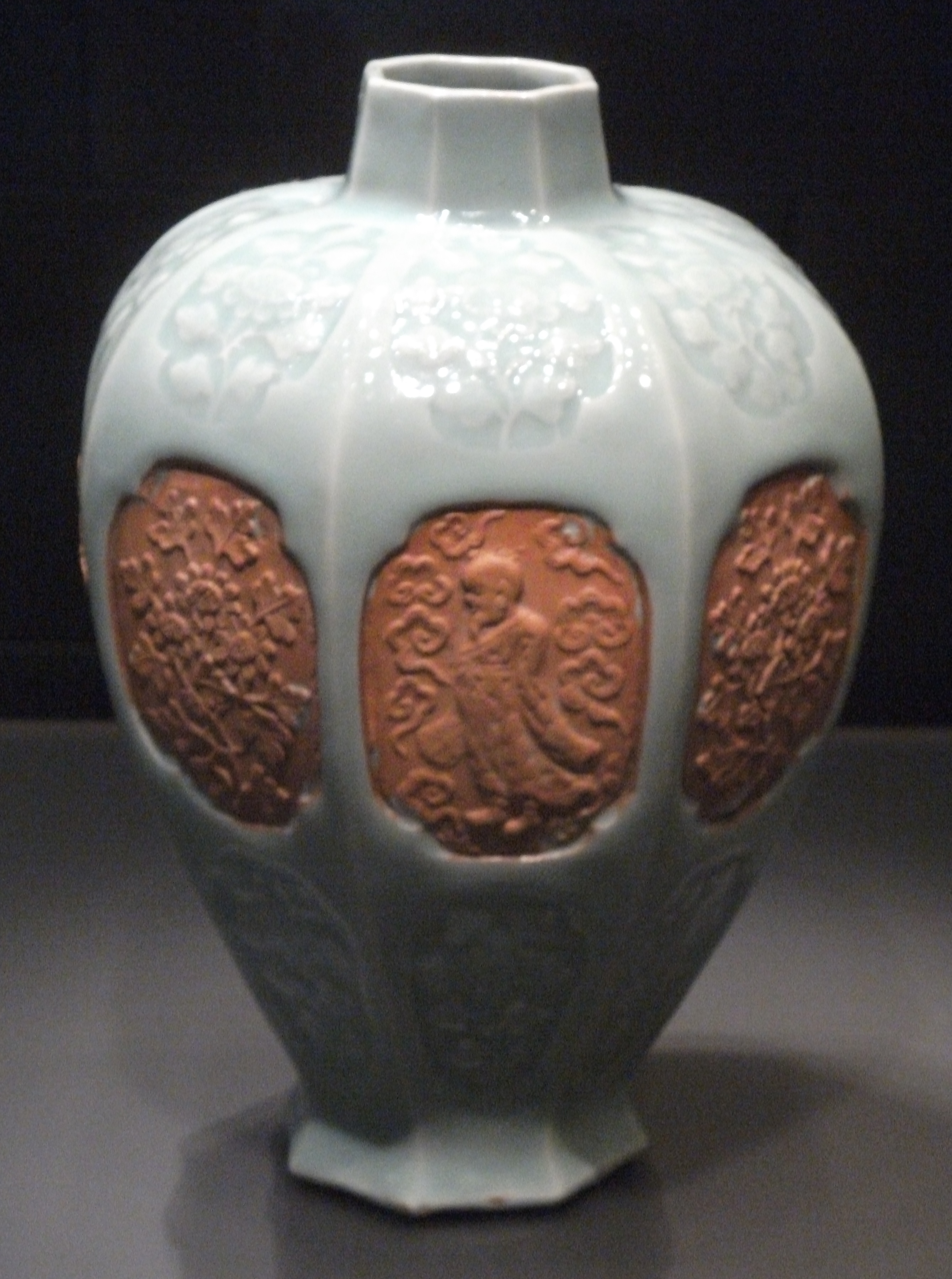
Longquan celadon vase, 14th century; the unglazed medallions were coated with a resist before the vase was coated with liquid glaze.

A resist, used in many areas of manufacturing and art, is something that is added to parts of an object to create a pattern by protecting these parts from being affected by a subsequent stage in the process. Often the resist is then removed.

For example, in the resist dyeing of textiles, wax or a similar substance is added to places where the dye is not wanted. The wax will "resist" the dye, and after it is removed there will be a pattern in two colours. Batik, shibori and tie-dye are among many styles of resist dyeing.

Wax or grease can also be used as a resist in pottery, to keep some areas free from a ceramic glaze; the wax burns away when the piece is fired. Song dynasty Jizhou ware used paper cut-outs and leaves as resists or stencils under glaze to create patterns. Other uses of resists in pottery work with slip or paints, and a whole range of modern materials used as resists. A range of similar techniques can be used in watercolour and other forms of painting. While these artistic techniques stretch back centuries, a range of new applications of the resist principle have recently developed in microelectronics and nanotechnology. An example is resists in semiconductor fabrication, using photoresists (often just referred to as "resists") in photolithography.

== Etching ==
Etching processes use a resist, though in these typically the whole object is covered in the resist (called the "ground" in some contexts), which is then selectively removed from some parts. This is the case when a resist is used to prepare the copper substrate for champlevé enamels, where parts of the field are etched (with acid or electrically) into hollows to be filled with powdered glass, which is then melted. In chemical milling, as many forms of industrial etching are called, the resist may be referred to as the "maskant", and in many contexts the process may be known as masking. A fixed resist pre-shaped with the pattern is often called a stencil, or in some contexts a frisket.

The Oxford English Dictionary does not record the word "resist" in this sense before the 1830s, when it was used in relation to both "calico-printing" (1836) and metalwork with copper (1839). Resists were also used to etch steel from the mid-19th century.

== Gallery ==
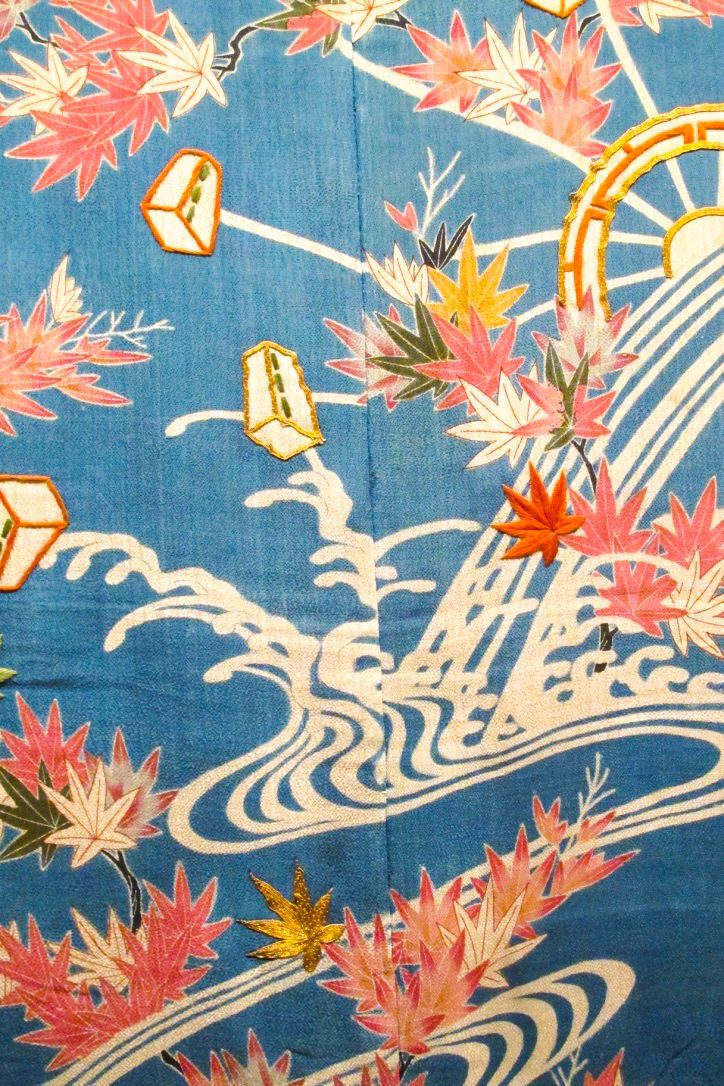
Yūzen resist technique, with crisp, thin white outlines around the dyed patterns, created by ridges of resist paste that separate areas of dye

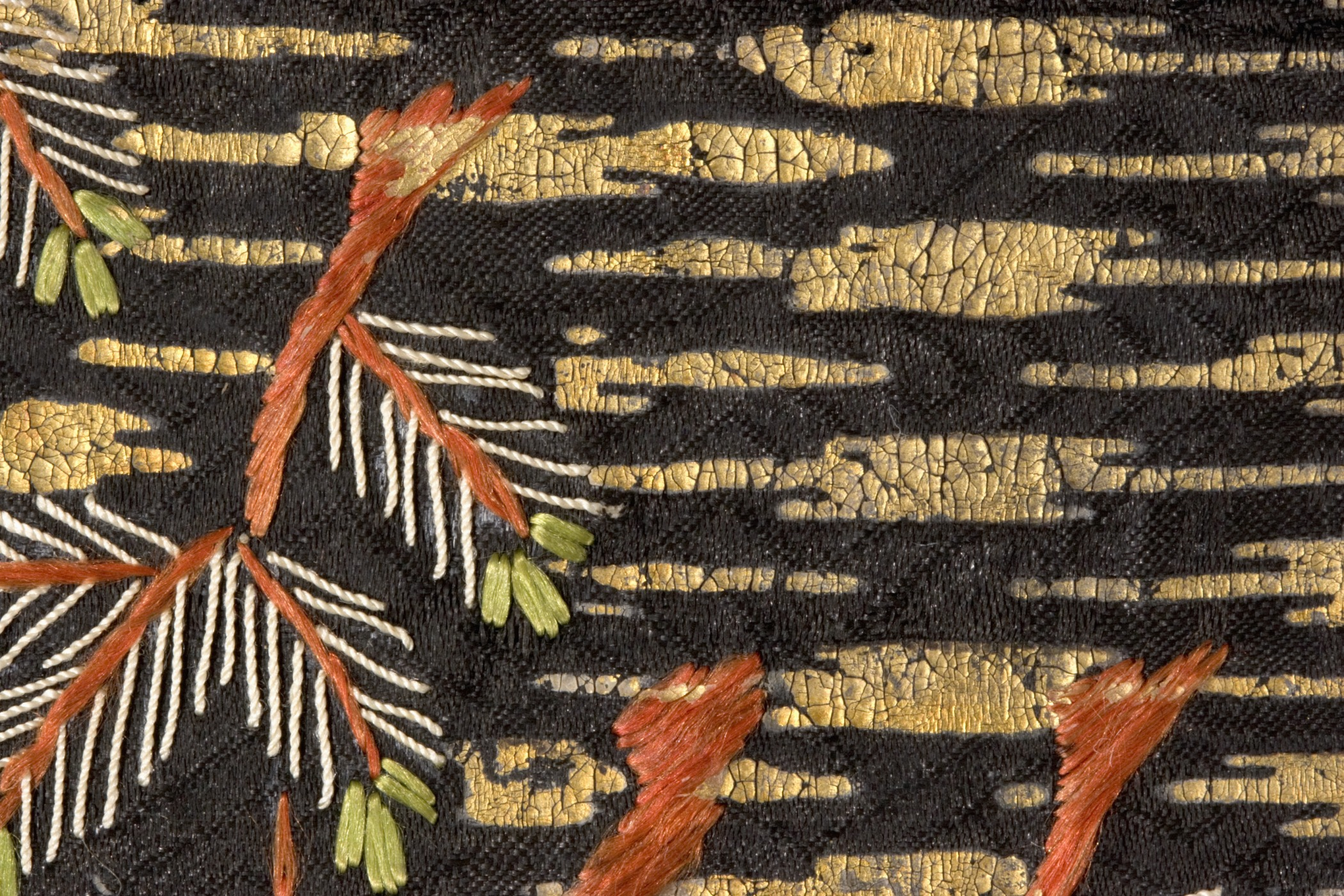
Detail of tie-dyed silk (kanako shibori) with embroidery, Japan, 17th century. Pressure resist, no paste.

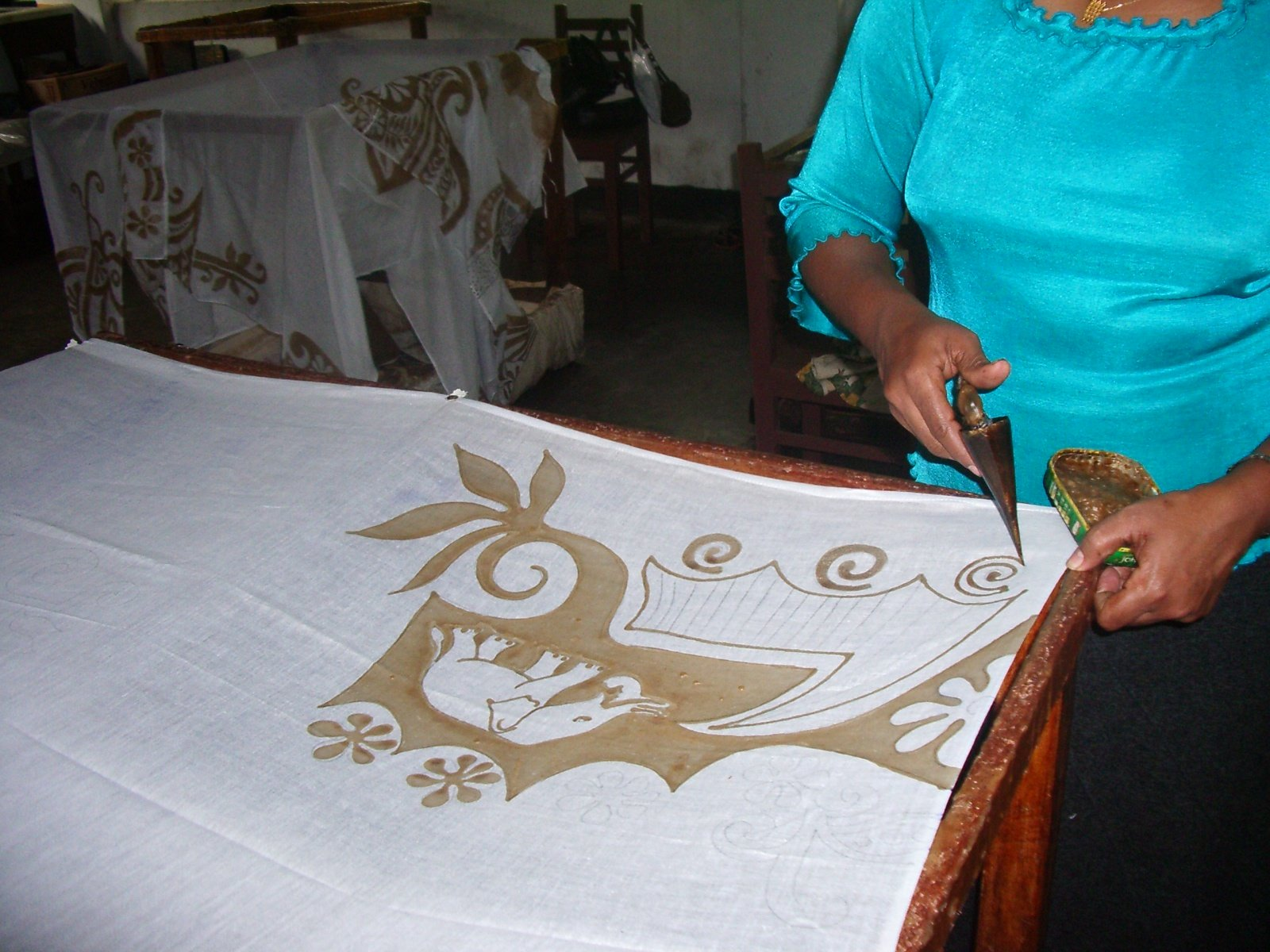
Applying a batik resist in Sri Lanka

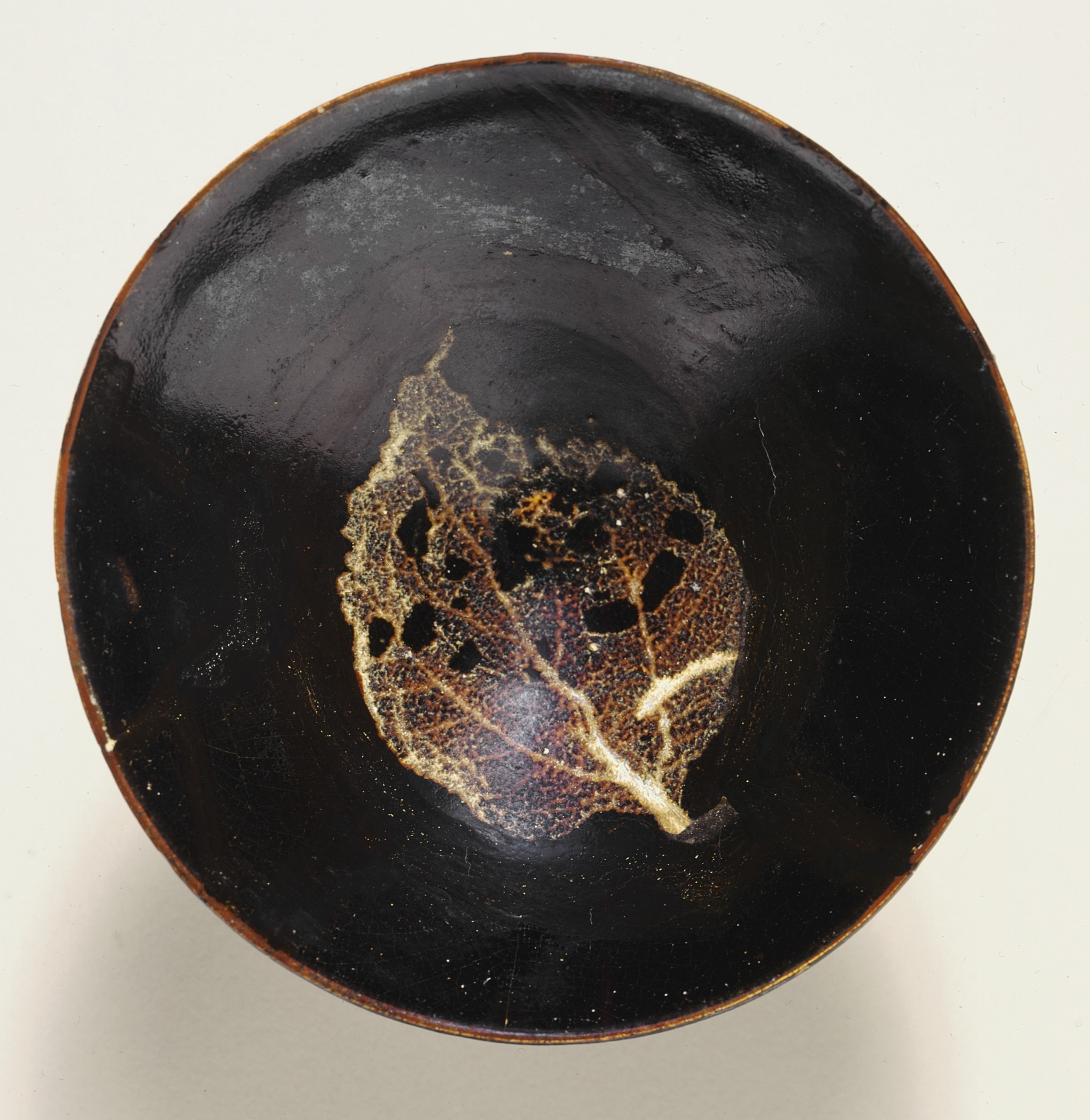
Jizhou ware tea bowl with natural leaf resist decoration and brown glaze, late southern Song dynasty, about 1200–1279

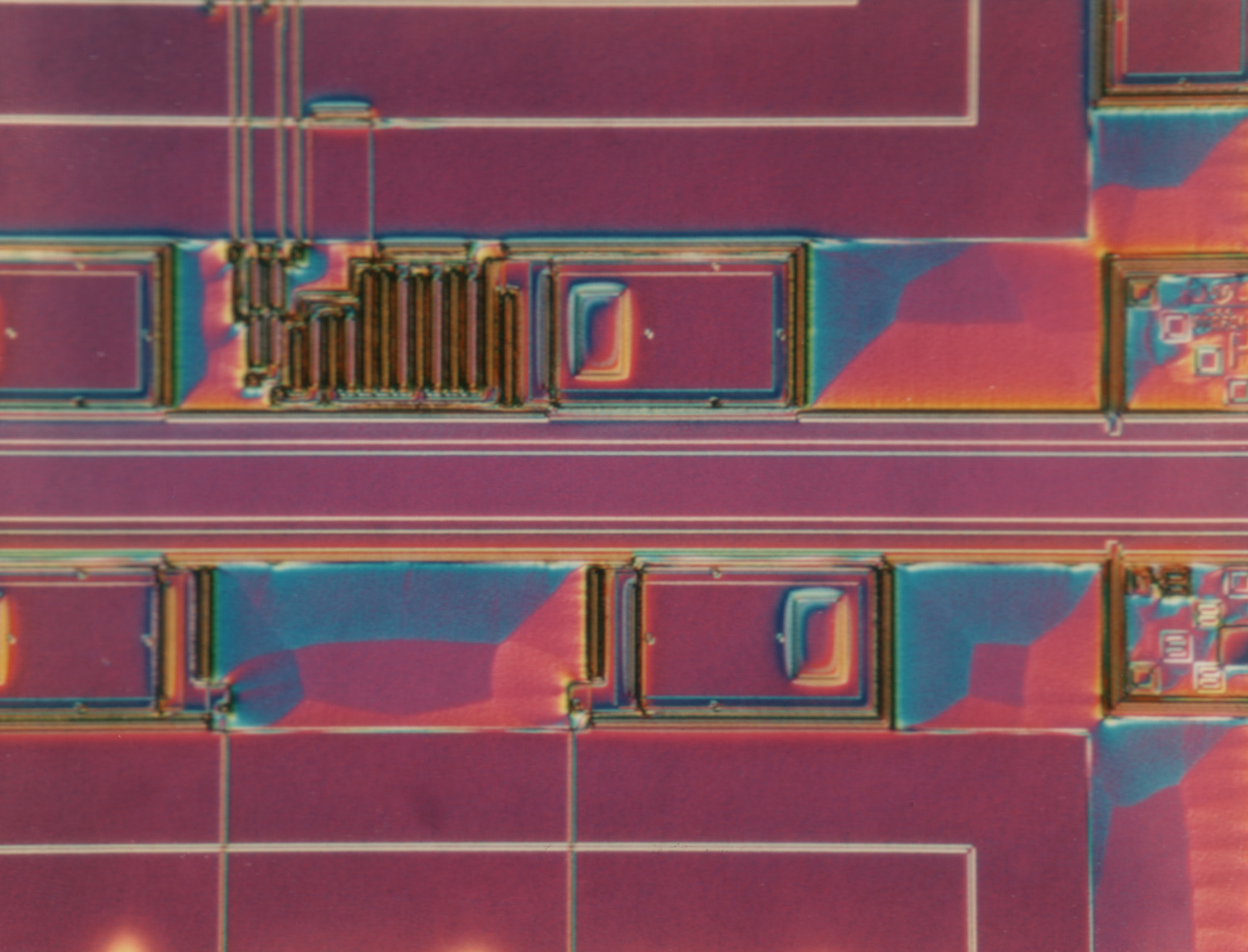
A problem in a silicon integrated circuit wafer. The pink and blue irregularly shaped rectangles are areas of photoresist that should have been fully developed and rinse away (purple), but there was a defect in processing. Seen under differential interference contrast microscopy.
