= Jian ware =

Type of Chinese pottery

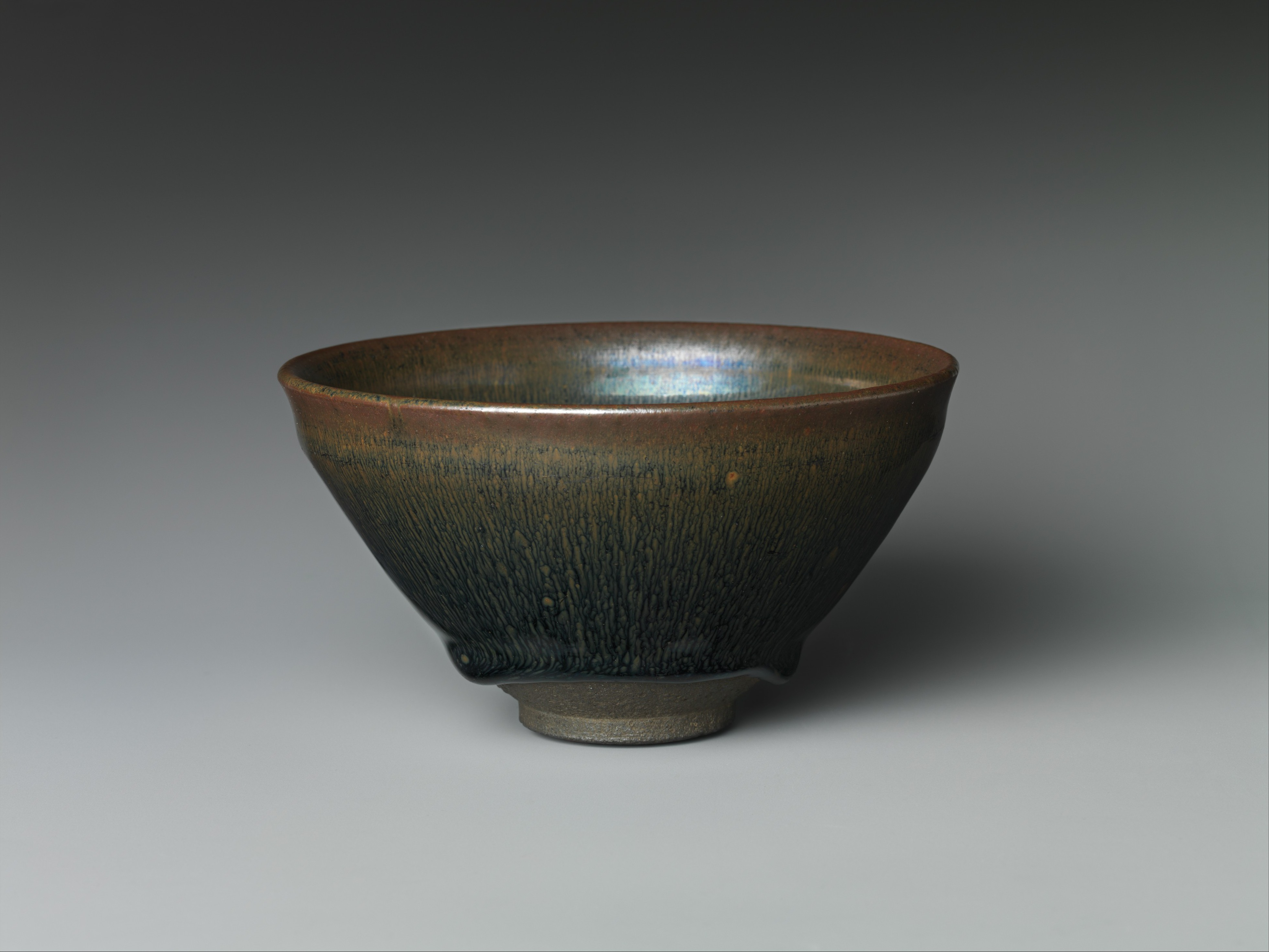
- Jian tea bowl with "hare's fur" glaze, southern Song dynasty, 12th century, Metropolitan Museum of Art
- Branch: Chinese ceramics
- Years active: Tang – Yuan dynasty (9th–14th century); peak during Song dynasty
- Location: Jianyang (ancient Jian'an), Fujian, China
- Influences: Earlier Fujian black-glazed wares
- Influenced: Jizhou ware, Tenmoku, Korean tea bowls

Jian ware or Chien ware (Chinese: 建窯; pinyin: Jiàn yáo; Wade–Giles: Chien-yao) is a type of Chinese pottery originally made in Jianyang, Fujian province. It, and local imitations of it, are known in Japan as Tenmoku (天目). It consists of simple shapes in stoneware, with a strong emphasis on subtle effects in the glazes. In the Song dynasty they achieved a high prestige, especially among Buddhist monks and in relation to tea-drinking. They were also highly valued in Japan, where many of the best examples were collected. Though the ceramic body is light-coloured, the wares, generally small cups for tea, bowls and vases, normally are glazed in dark colours, with special effects such as the "hare's fur" "oil-spot" and "partridge feather" patterns caused randomly as excess iron in the glaze is forced out during firing.

== History ==
In Chinese it is called Jian zhan (建盏), which translates as "Jian (tea)cup". The original kiln was called Jian Yao (建窑). The original prefecture where it came from was then renamed into Jianzhou (建州) in 621 CE during the Tang dynasty. The ware therefore became also known based on its origin as Jianzhou zhan (建州盏).

The Song dynasty scholar and Fujian native Cai Xiang (1012–1067) noted in his "The Record of Tea":

Tea is of light colour and looks best in black cups. The cups made at Jianyang are bluish-black in colour, marked like the fur of a hare. Being of rather thick fabric they retain the heat, so that when once warmed through they cool very slowly, and they are additionally valued on this account. None of the cups produced at other places can rival these. Blue and white cups are not used by those who give tea-tasting parties.

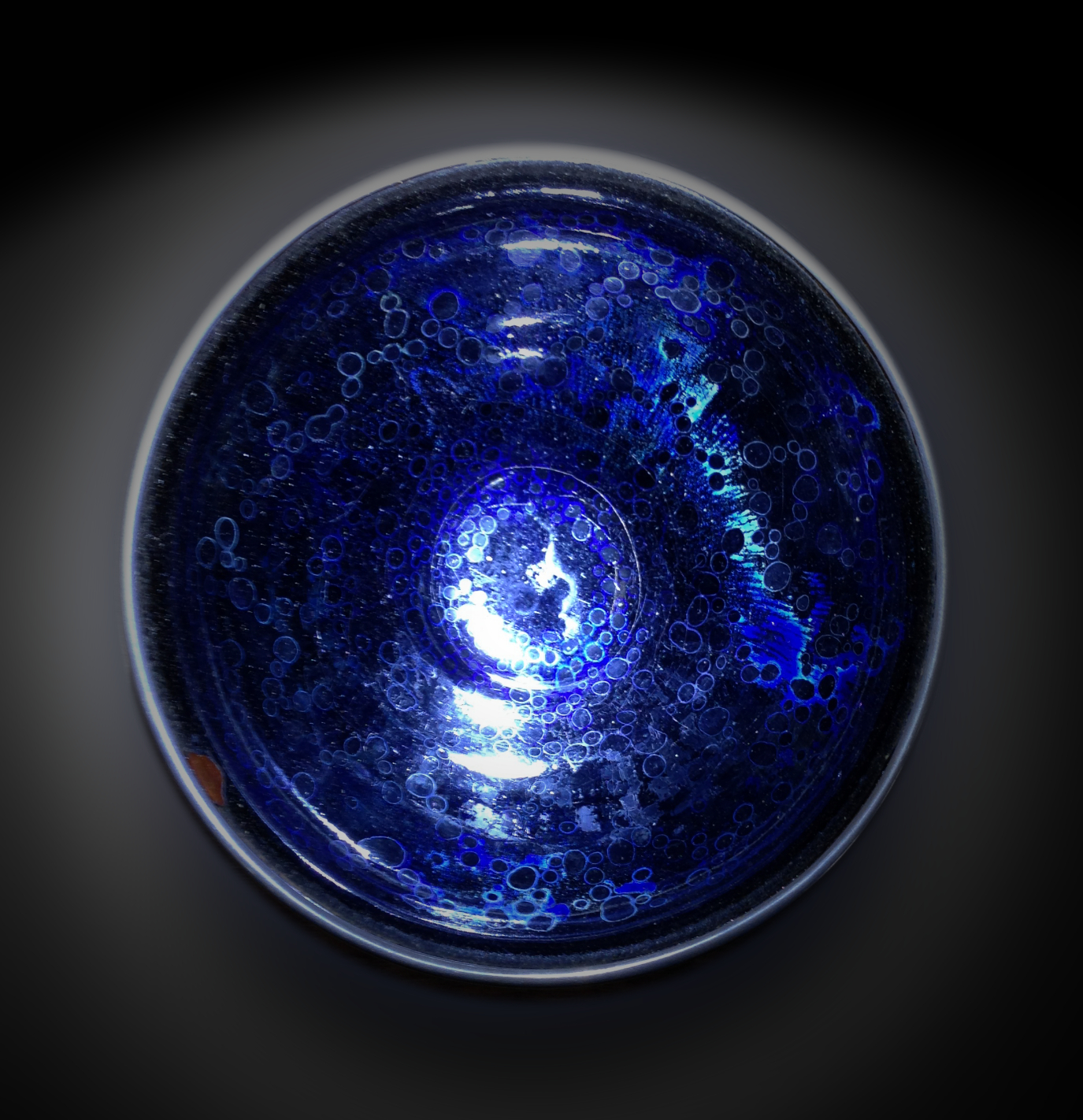
Jian yohen tenmoku tea bowl with blue and green "oil spot" marks, southern Song dynasty, 13th century. National Treasure (Japan)

At the time, tea was prepared by whisking powdered leaves that had been pressed into dried cakes together with hot water, which was somewhat akin to matcha in the Japanese tea ceremony. The water added to this powder produced a white froth that would stand out better against a dark bowl. Jian ware reached the peak of its popularity during the Song dynasty. Vessels of this time were also greatly appreciated and copied in Japan, where they are known as tenmoku (天目) wares. The Japanese term derives from Tianmu Mountain (天目山), where this type of vessel was supposed to originate from and be appreciated. Five of these vessels that originate during the southern Song dynasty are so highly valued that they were included by the government in the list of National Treasures of Japan (crafts: others).

Tastes in preparation changed during the Ming dynasty; the Hongwu Emperor (1328–1398) himself preferred leaves to powdered cakes, and would accept only leaf tea as tribute from tea-producing regions. Leaf tea, in contrast to powdered tea, was prepared by steeping whole leaves in boiling water – a process that led to the invention of the teapot and subsequent popularity of Yixing wares over the dark tea bowls. While in China the art of Jian ware faded and then died out, in Japan it continued and became the foremost producer of this type of ware, also due to the importance and development of the tea ceremony.

Renewed interest in the history and cultural heritage in China has revived starting in the 1990s. At the Jiyufang Laolong site (吉玉坊老龍窯), located in a village near the town of Shuiji not far from Wuyishan, Master Xiong Zhonggui has been able to restart production of Jian Zhan using original clay, after studying with Japanese maskers. Kilns in Dehua County are also attempting in recreating it.

On 15 September 2016 a Song-era Jian ware tea-bowl of the yuteki tenmoku type, long in the Japanese Kuroda family collection, was auctioned at Christie's New York for over $US11 million. The pre-sale estimate was $US1.5 to 2.5 million. The bowl was registered by the Japanese government as an Important Art Object on 18 December 1935 and deregistered on 4 September 2015 for the sale.

== Characteristics ==
The wares were made using local iron-rich clays and fired in an oxidising atmosphere at temperatures in the region of 1,300 °C (2,370 °F). The glaze was made using clay similar to that used for forming the body, except fluxed with wood-ash. They share some similarities with Jizhou ware, which developed around the same time.

Many examples have distinct finishes in the glaze, which are much prized by collectors. The main three types of glaze patterns are:

- "hare's fur" (兔毫盞)
- "tortoiseshell" (鼈甲盞)
- "partridge feathers" (雪鷓鴣盞)

At high temperatures the molten glaze separates to produce the pattern called "hare's fur". When Jian wares were set tilted for firing, drips run down the side, creating pooling of the liquid glaze, which is retained after firing.

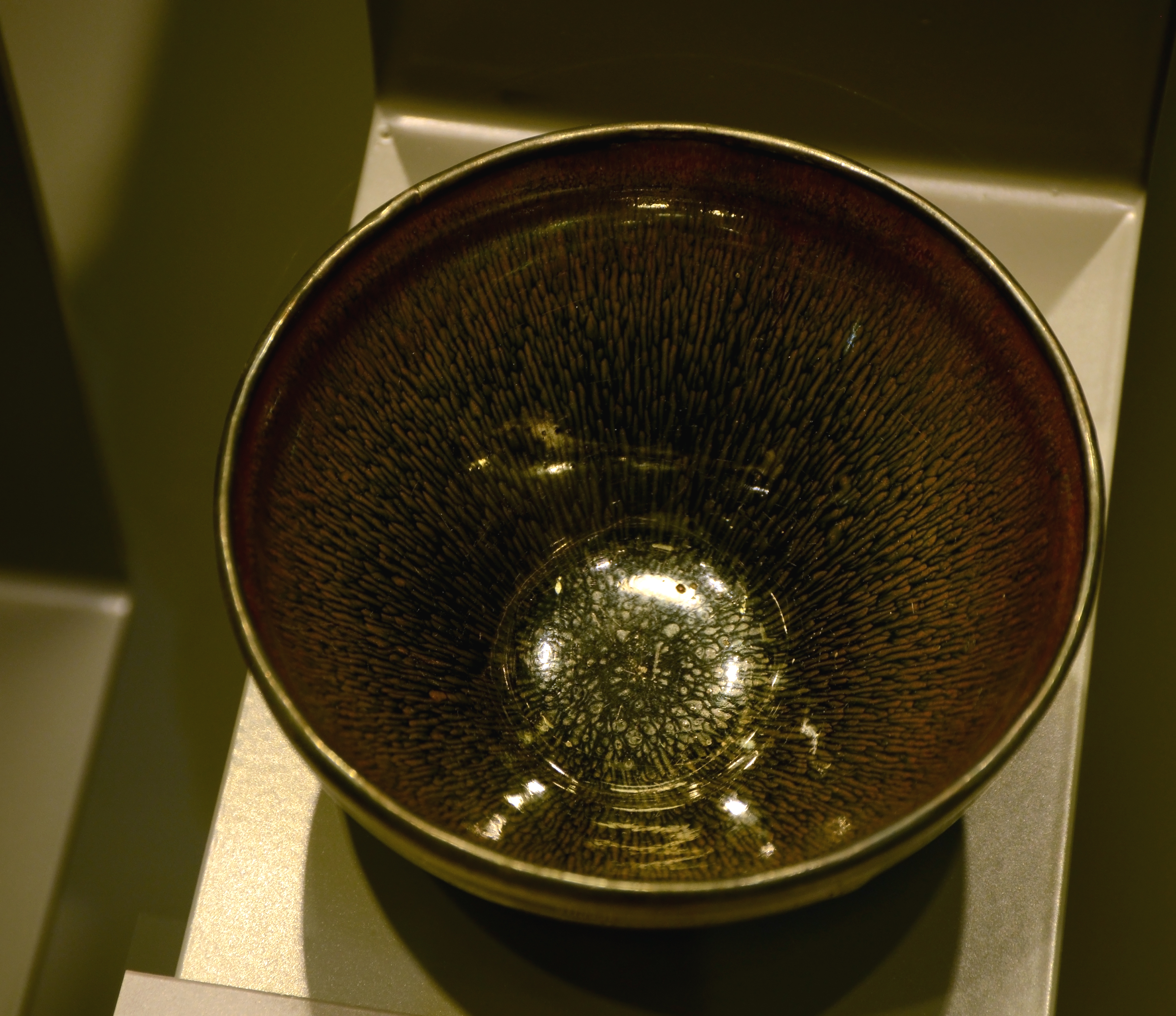
Hare's fur glaze, Song dynasty, China

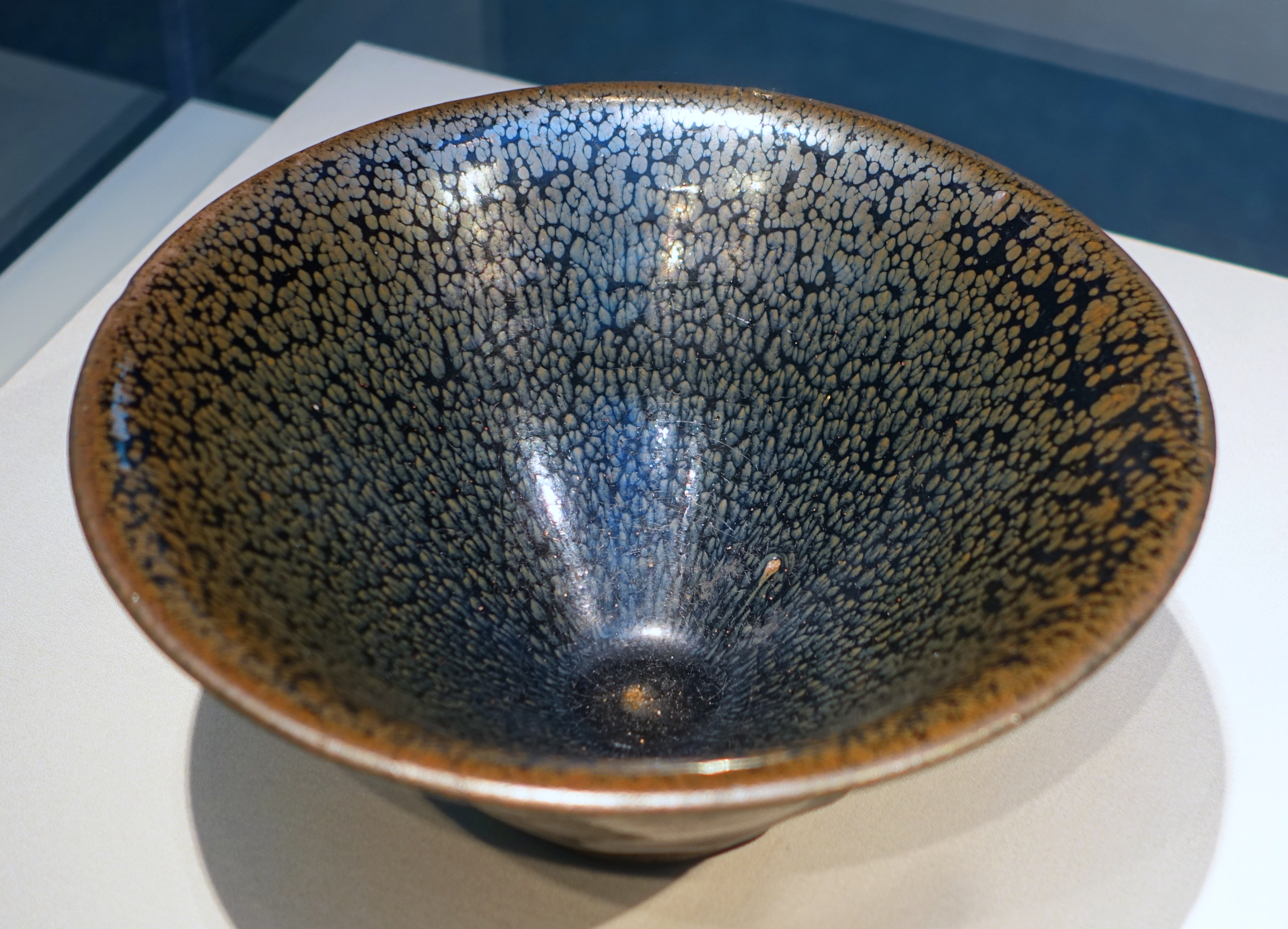
Oil spot glaze, Song dynasty, China

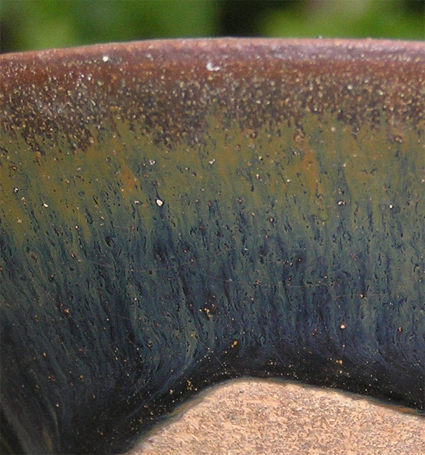
View of the "hare's fur" glazing effect on a Jian bowl

== Example ==
A "hare's fur" Jian tea bowl in the Metropolitan Museum of Art was made during the Song dynasty (960–1279) and exhibits the typical pooling, or thickening, of the glaze near the bottom.

The "hare's fur" patterning in the glaze of this bowl resulted from the random effect of phase separation during early cooling in the kiln and is unique to this bowl. This phase separation in the iron-rich glazes of Chinese blackwares was also used to produce the well-known "oil-spot" (油滴), "teadust" and "partridge-feather" (鷓鴣斑) glaze effects. No two bowls have identical patterning. The bowl also has a dark brown "iron-foot" which is typical of this style. It would have been fired, probably with several thousand other pieces, each in its own stackable saggar, in a single-firing in a large dragon kiln. One such kiln, built on the side of a steep hill, was almost 150 metres in length, although most Jian dragon kilns were shorter than 100 metres.

== Revival ==
The style of Jian ware has been much imitated over the last century, in Japan, the West, and recently also in China. Starting in the 1990s, the Ji Yu Fang Lao Long factory outside of Wuyishan, Fujian, in the village of Shui Ji under Master Xiong has been able to restart production of Jian Zhan using the original raw materials. People in Dehua County are also attempting in recreating it. Notably, the Taiwanese American ceramics master Chun Wen Wang has successfully recreated the Jian ware and tenmoku styles through a mix of modern technology and ancient research. His work has been recognized to be a faithful recreation of the Jian ware style and collected by multiple eminent international museums.
