= Ash glaze =

Ceramic glazes made from wood-ash

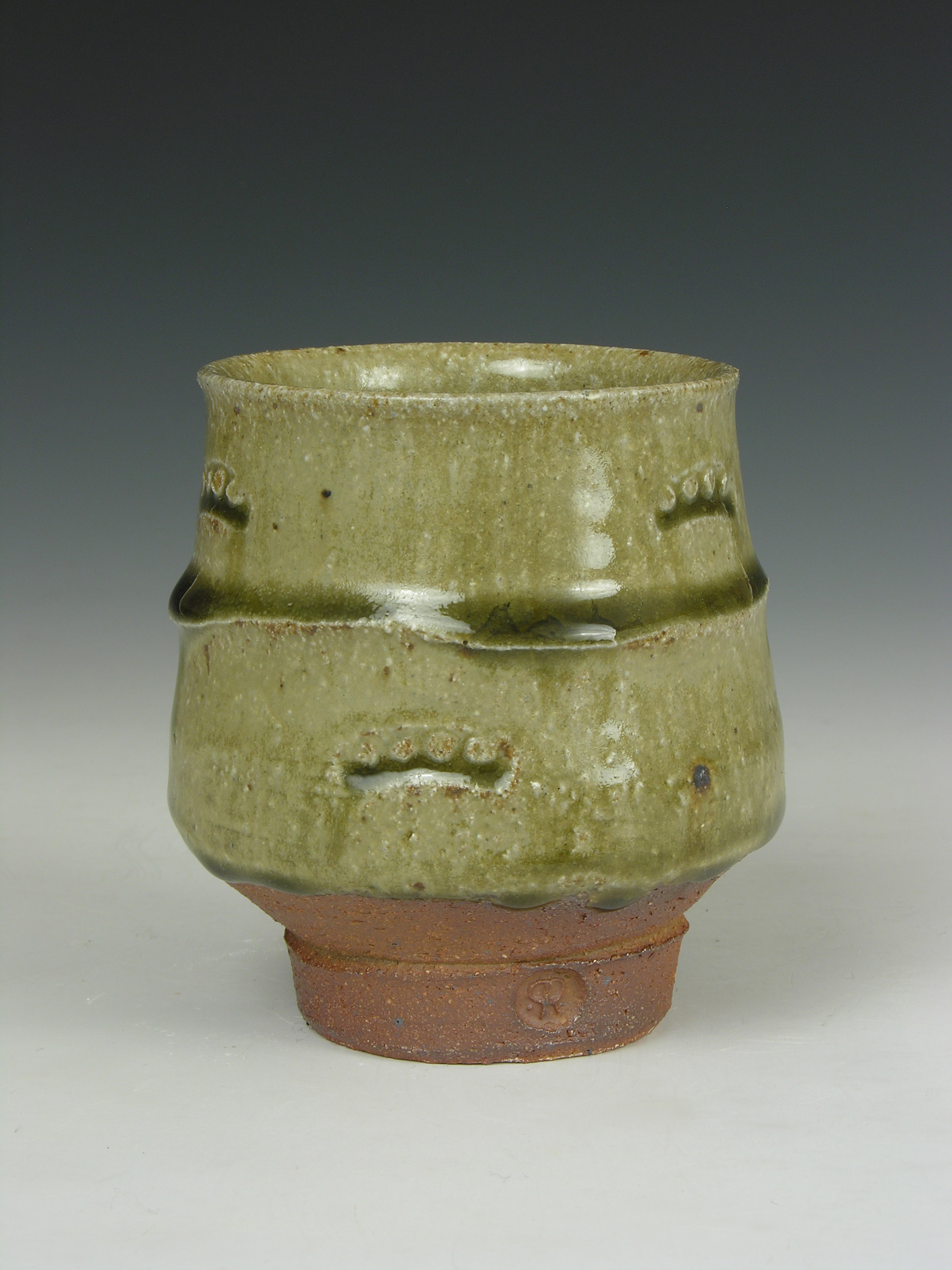
A yunomi or tea cup with an ash glaze, pooling at the horizontal ridges, made from pine ash by Phil Rogers

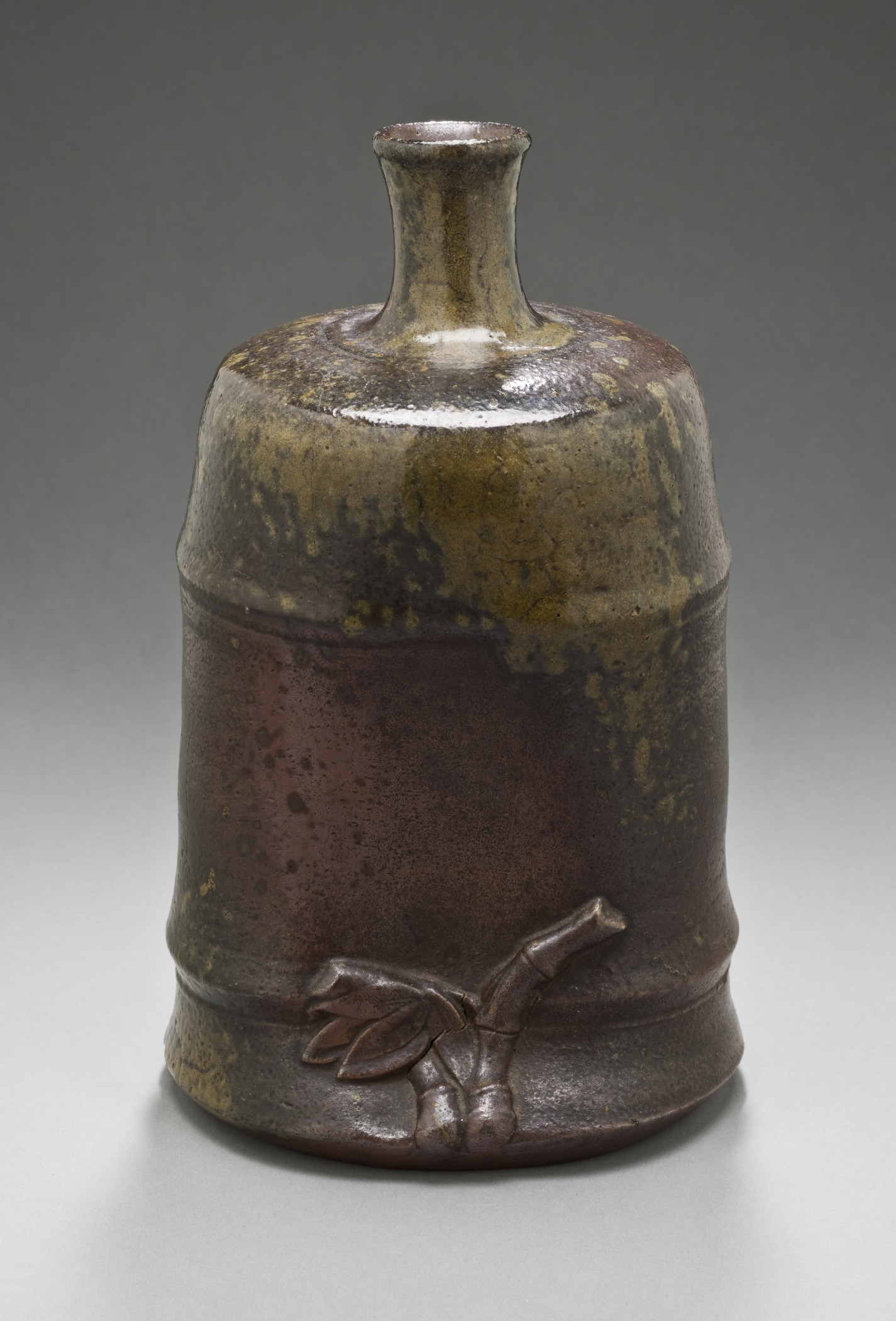
Sake bottle (tokkuri) in the form of a bamboo node, with "naturally occurring" ash glaze, most heavily collected on the shoulder. Japan, 18th century.

Ash glazes are ceramic glazes made from the ash of various kinds of wood or straw. They have historically been important in East Asia, especially Chinese pottery, Korean pottery, and Japanese pottery. Many traditionalist East Asian potteries still use ash glazing, and it has seen a large revival in studio pottery in the West and East. Some potters like to achieve random effects by setting up the kiln so that ash created during firing falls onto the pots; this is called "natural" or "naturally occurring" ash glaze. Otherwise the ash is mixed with water, and often clay, and applied as a paste.

Ash glazing began around 1500 BC, in China during the Shang dynasty, initially by accident as ash from the burnt wood in the kiln landed on pots. Around 1000 BC, the Chinese apparently realized that the ash covering the pieces was causing the glaze so they started adding ash as a glaze before the pot went into the kiln. Ash glaze was the first glaze used in East Asia, and contained only ash, clay, and water.

One of the ceramic fluxes in ash glazes is calcium oxide (CaO), commonly known as quicklime, and most ash glazes are part of the lime glaze family, not all of which use ash. In some ash glazes extra lime was added to the ash, which may have been the case with Chinese Yue ware. A relatively high temperature of around 1170 °C is required, high enough to make the body into stoneware or (above about 1200 °C and with the right materials) porcelain.

== Appearance ==
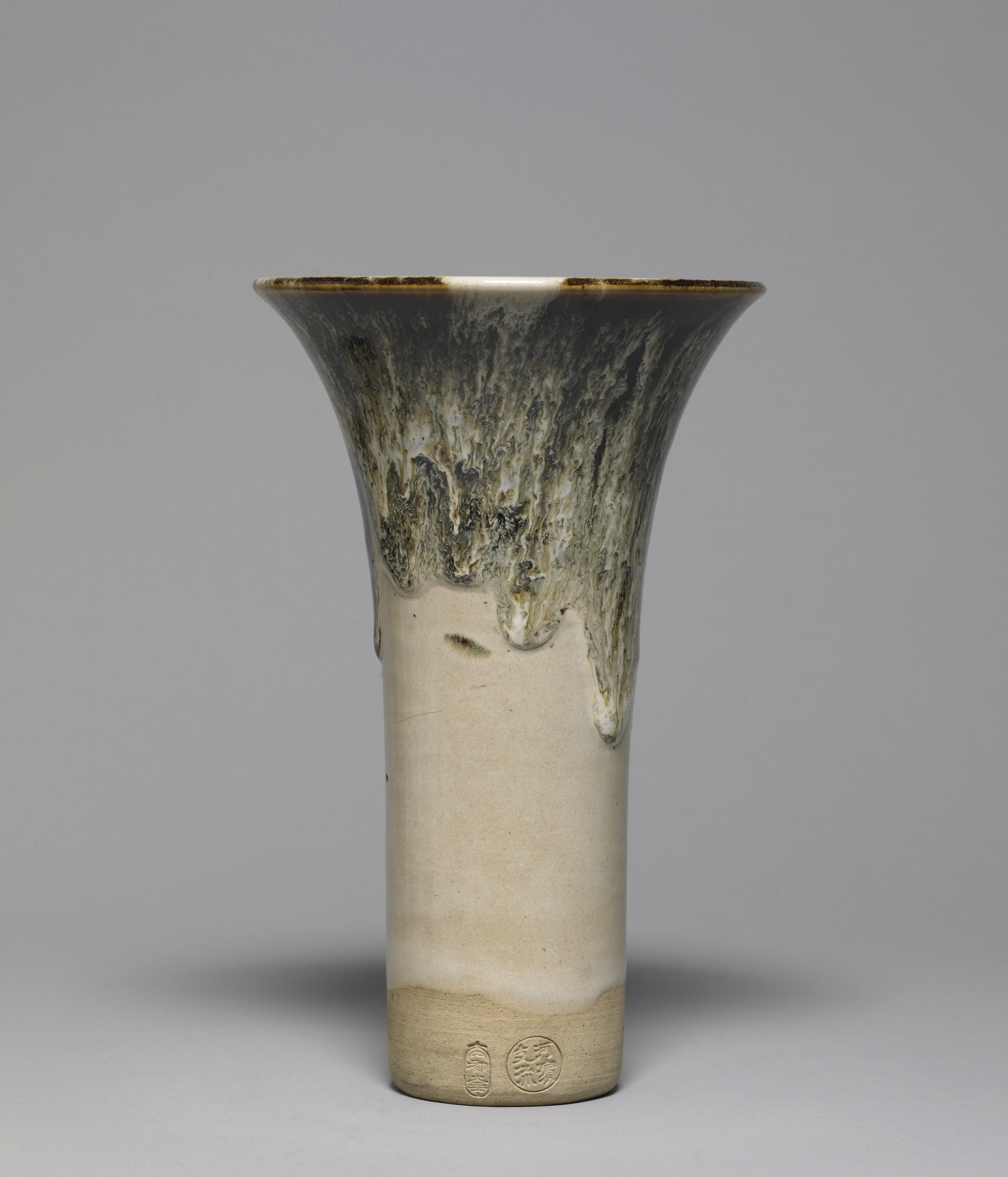
Detail of dripping rice-straw ash glaze (top), Japan, 1852

The glaze has glasslike and pooling (buildup of glaze) characteristics which puts emphasis on the surface texture of the piece being glazed. When the glaze is mostly made up of wood ash, the final result is mostly dark brown to green. The pots with these glazes resemble the earth in color and texture. As the ash percentage decreases, the artist has more control on the color and the final glaze color, using wood, differs from light to dark shades of brown or green, if no other coloring agents are added. Rice-straw ash glaze produces an opaque creamy-white glaze; it is high in silica. If the ash is very thick, there may be sufficient phosphorus to give an "opalescent blue"; rice-husk ash is good for this.

"Natural" ash glaze from ash falling in the kiln tends to collect thickly on the shoulders of typical shapes of storage jar, and begin to drip down the walls of the vessel. This effect might be aided by tying plaits of straw around the shoulders before placing in the kiln.

== Making the ash ==
To create the ash, the material needs to burn completely in a kiln. Wood ash is around 1% the mass of the original wood, though some kinds of straw leave ash at a much higher percentage of the original weight. Usually a large quantity of wood or straw is necessary to produce the ash. The ash is then put through a sieve to eliminate the excess clumps from the ash. At this point, artists can process the ash further to create a more uniform mixture or leave it unprocessed so there are more random final results. To process the ash, water is first added to the mixture and left to settle for a couple of hours. The solution is drained and dried and the result is ash containing less harmful chemicals like some soluble alkalis.

A wide range of plants have been used, and their differing chemical compositions can give very different effects.

== Composition ==
Most wood ash is primarily made up of calcium carbonate (CaCO_{3}), which is used in many glaze recipes. The ash also contains potassium carbonate (K_{2}CO_{3}), phosphates, and other metals; however, the ratio of these chemicals depend on the location, soil, and type of wood the ash came from. The varying chemical compositions of ashes used to make the glaze produce different results from batch to batch. Furthermore, two pieces with the same glaze batch can even have different results. If the ash is not cleaned or mixed thoroughly the glaze mixture may be inconsistent in chemical composition.

== Present glaze ==
Current ash glazes usually contain 50% less wood ash than they did when the majority of the glaze was ash. The decrease in ash percentage is to give the artist some control over the chemical make up and result of the glaze. Currently, ash glazes are mostly used by artists as a decorative tool, but some still use ash glaze ware. In Korea, the traditional ash glaze composed of only ash and water is used to make functional pottery such as bowls, cups, and teapots.

== See also ==
- Celadon – Term for ceramics with two different types of glazes
- Onggi – Type of Korean earthenware
- Raku ware – Type of Japanese pottery traditionally used in tea ceremonies
- Shino ware – Type of Japanese pottery
