= Tenmoku =

Type of Japanese pottery imitating Chinese stoneware

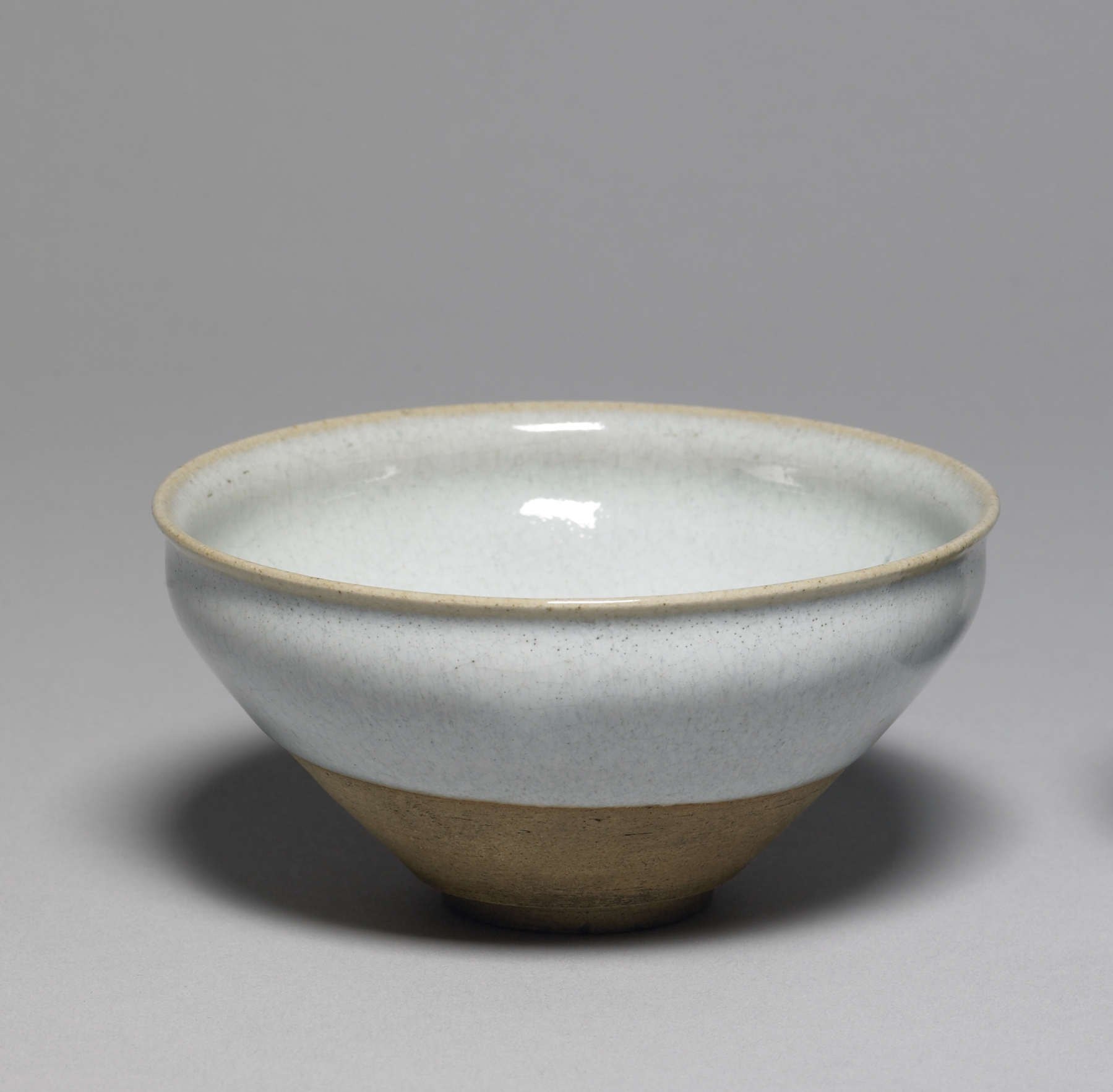
White tenmoku Ofuke ware bowl, medium stoneware with rice-straw ash glaze, between 1700–1850 Edo period

Tenmoku (天目, also spelled "temmoku" and "temoku") is a type of glaze that originates in imitating Chinese Jian ware (建盏) of the southern Song dynasty (1127–1279), original examples of which are also called tenmoku in Japan.

Jian ware tea bowl shapes are conical in form with a slight indent below the rim. They are about 4–5 inches (10–13 cm) in width and 2–3.5 inches (5.1–8.9 cm) in height. The emphasis is on the ceramic glaze, where a number of distinct effects can be produced, some including an element of randomness that has a philosophical appeal to the Japanese. The tea-masters who developed the Japanese tea ceremony promoted the aesthetic underlying tenmoku pottery.

== History ==
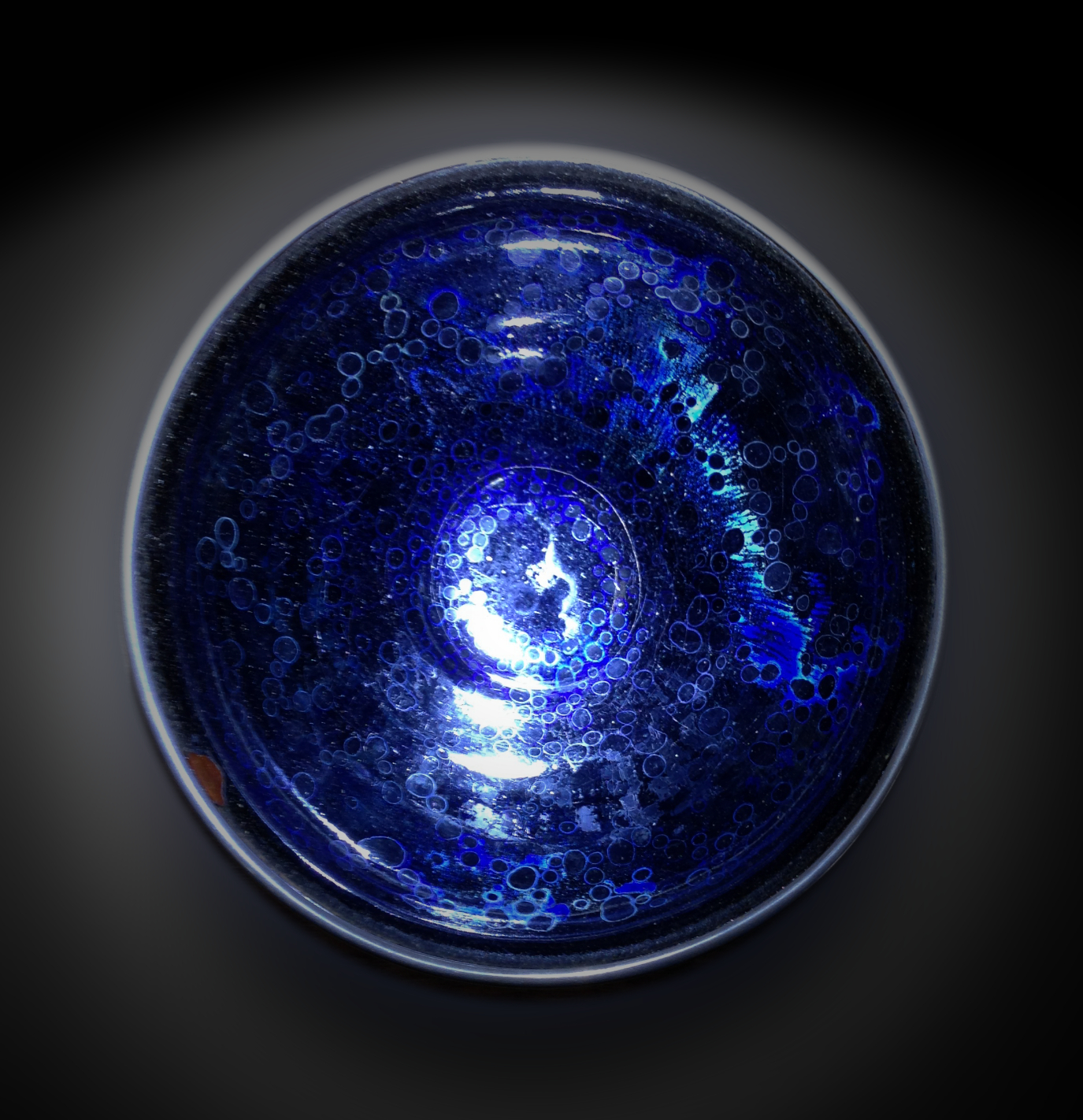
Chinese Jian ware yohen tenmoku tea bowl with blue and green "oil spot" marks, southern Song dynasty, 13th century. National Treasure (Japan)

Tenmoku takes its name from the Tianmu Mountain (天目 Mandarin: tiān mù; Japanese: ten moku; English: Heaven's Eye) temple in China where iron-glazed bowls were used for tea. The style became widely popular during the Song dynasty. In Chinese it is called Jian Zhan (建盏), which means "Jian (tea)cup".

According to chronicles in 1406, the Yongle Emperor (1360–1424) of the Ming dynasty sent ten Jian ware bowls to the shōgun Ashikaga Yoshimitsu (1358–1408), who ruled during the Muromachi period. A number of Japanese monks who traveled to monasteries in China also brought pieces back home. As they became valued for tea ceremonies, more pieces were imported from China where they became highly prized goods. Three of these vessels from the southern Song dynasty are so highly valued that they were included by the government in the list of National Treasures of Japan (crafts: others).

The style was eventually produced in Japan as well, where it endures until this day. The Japanese term gradually replaced the original Chinese one for general ware of the type. Of particular renown were the kilns that produced tenmoku are Seto ware.

The glaze is still produced in Japan amongst a very small circle of artists, one being Kamada Kōji (鎌田幸二). Others are Nagae Sōkichi (長江惣吉), Hayashi Kyōsuke (林恭助), and Oketani Yasushi (桶谷寧). In the 1990s, renewed interest in the Jian ware in China means that masters such as Xiong Zhonggui in the village of Shuiji in Fujian has been able to restart production of Jian Zhan using the original raw materials.

== Characteristics ==
Contemporary chawan bowl with brownish tenmoku glaze

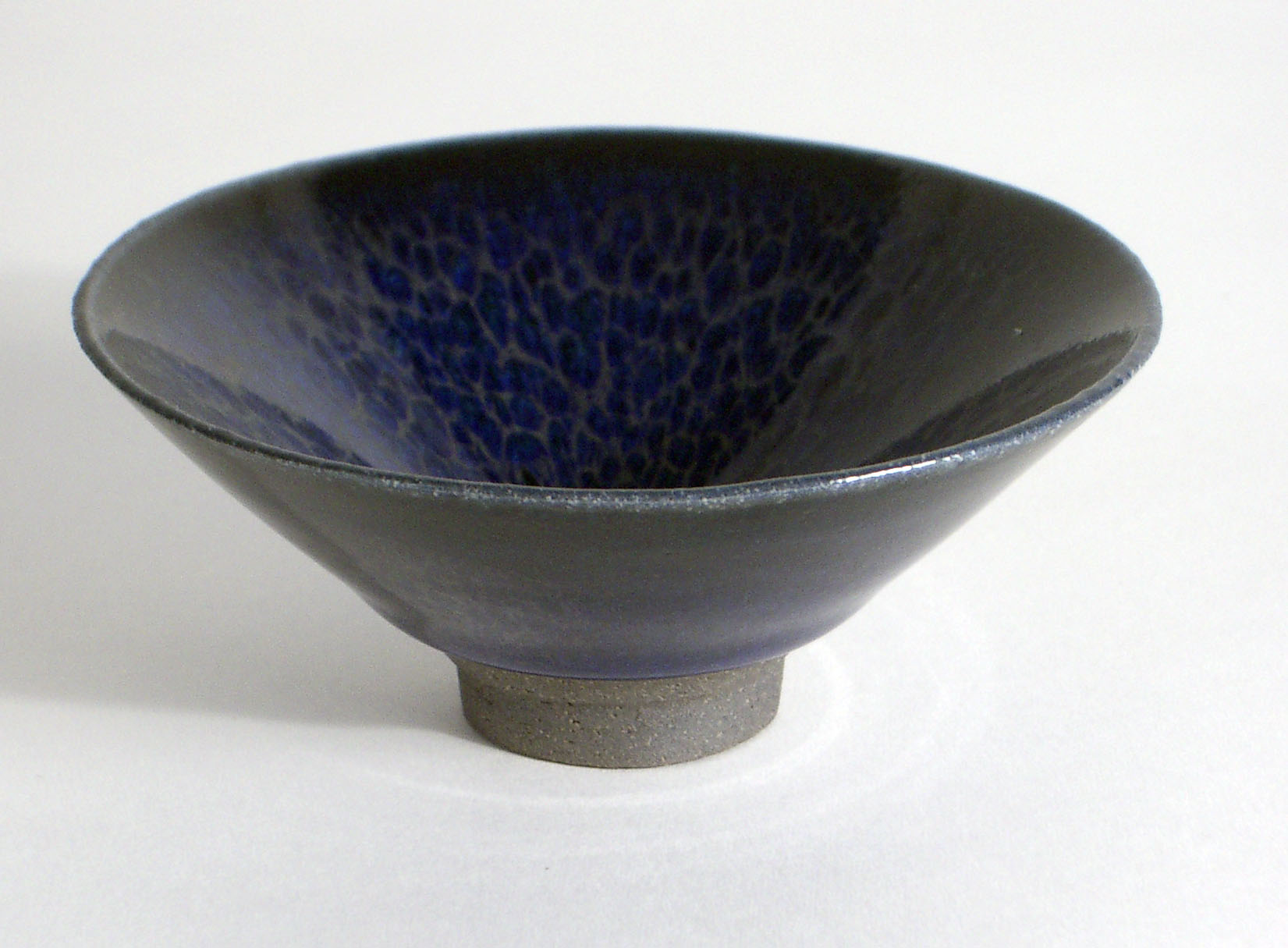
Contemporary sake cup with blue tenmoku glaze, by Kamada Kōji

It is made of feldspar, limestone, and iron oxide. The more quickly a piece is cooled, the blacker the glaze will be.

Tenmokus are known for their variability. During their heating and cooling, several factors influence the formation of iron crystals within the glaze. A long firing process and a clay body which is also heavily colored with iron increase the opportunity for iron from the clay to be drawn into the glaze. While the glaze is molten, iron can migrate within the glaze to form surface crystals, as in the "oil spot" glaze, or remain in solution deeper within the glaze for a rich glossy color. Oil spots are more common in an oxidation firing.

A longer cooling time allows for maximum surface crystals. Potters can "fire down" a kiln to help achieve this effect. During a normal firing, the kiln is slowly brought to a maximum temperature by adding fuel, then fueling is stopped and the kiln is allowed to cool slowly by losing heat to the air around it. To fire down a kiln, the potter continues to add a limited amount of fuel after the maximum temperature is reached to slow the cooling process and keep the glazes molten for as long as possible.

Tenmoku glazes can range in color from dark plum (persimmon), to yellow, to brown, to black.

The most common types of glaze are:

- Youhen (曜変天目)
- Yuteki (油滴天目)
- Haikatsugi (灰被天目)
- Nogime (禾目天目)
- Konoha (木葉天目)
- Moji (文字天目)
- Ran (鸞天目)
