= Yunomi =

Japanese type of teacup

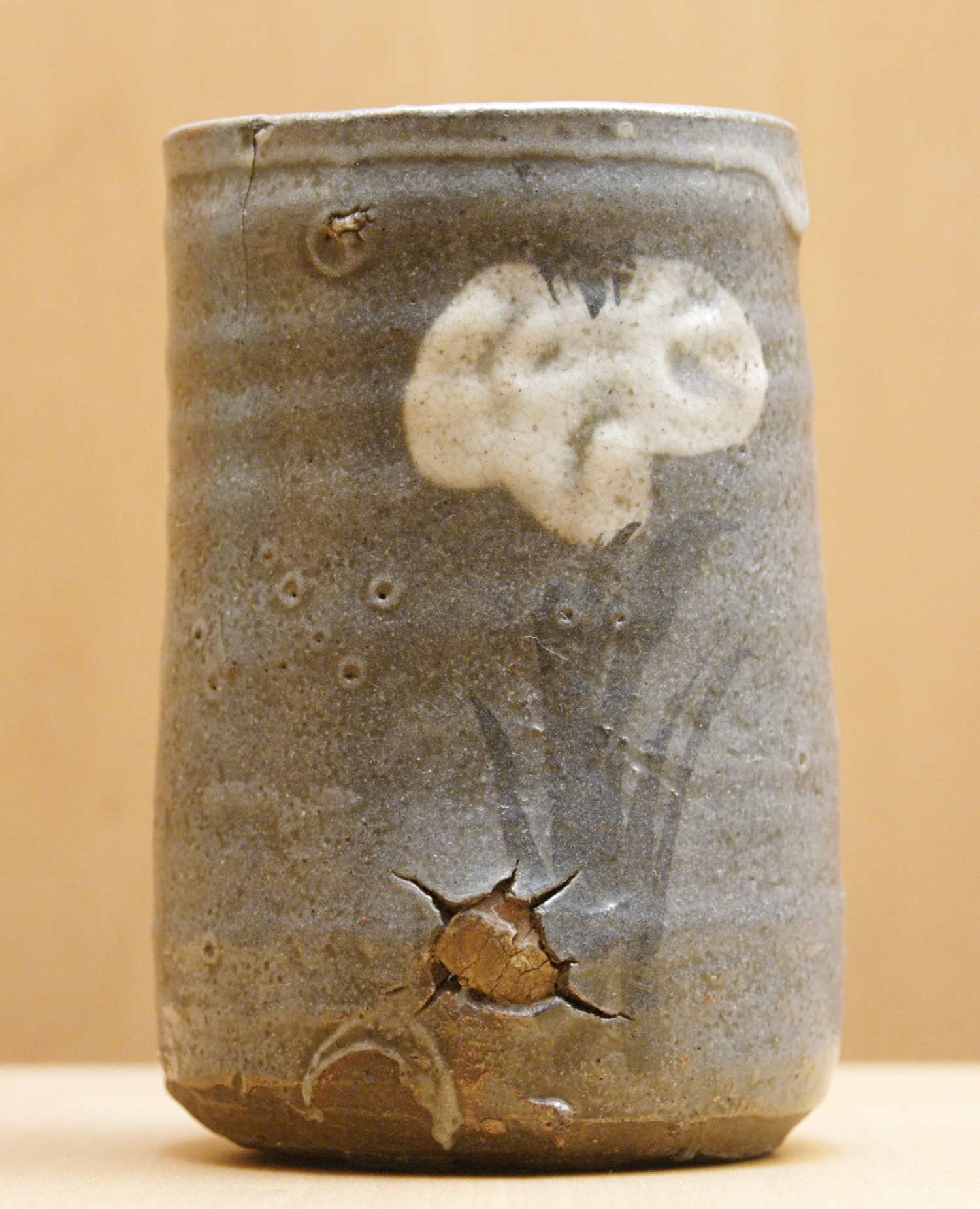
Karatsu ware yunomi, stoneware, Edo period, 16th–17th century

A yunomi (湯のみ) is a tall form of a Japanese teacup, typically made from a ceramic material and having no handle.

== Description ==
Yunomi teacups are tall with a trimmed or turned foot. They are usually held with two hands. Unlike the more formal chawan tea bowl which is used during the Japanese tea ceremony, the yunomi is made for daily or informal tea drinking.

== Variations ==
There are special pairs of yunomi called meoto yunomi. Meoto yunomi usually consist of two cups with the same pattern (sometimes in different colours) but slightly different sizes and often slightly different shapes (the larger cup being the "husband" and the smaller being the "wife" cup). This pairing is popular for wedding gifts.

== Genre ==
Many contemporary potters, both in the East and West, make yunomi. As a genre, the yunomi has become a much-collected item.
