= Japanese craft =

Handicrafts of Japan

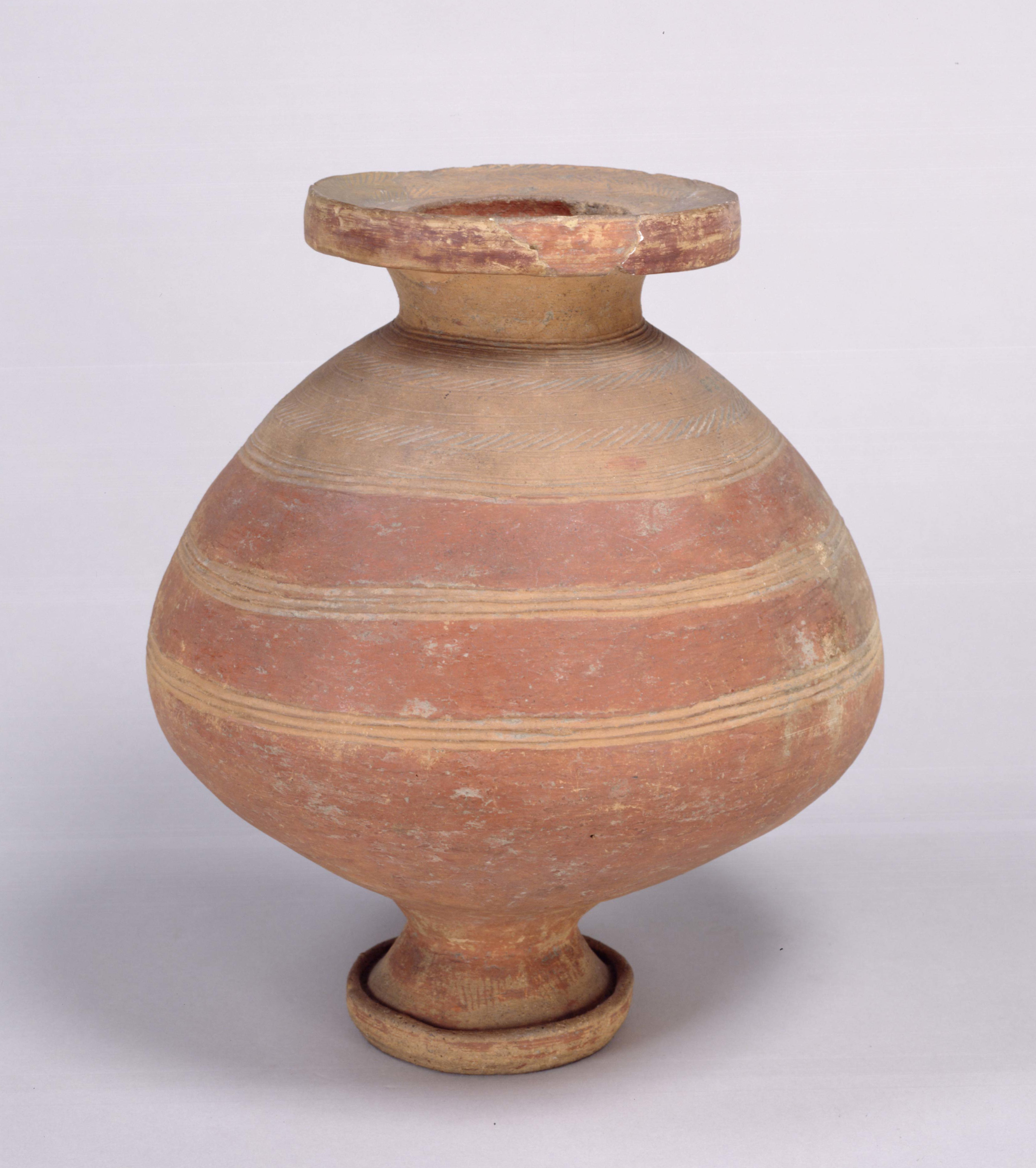
"Palace Style" footed jar, Aichi (found), Yayoi period, Tokyo National Museum (c. 1st–3rd century AD)

Traditional Japanese crafts (工芸, kōgei; lit. 'engineered art') have a long history. Included in the category of traditional crafts are handicrafts produced by individual artisans or groups, as well as works created by independent studio artists working with traditional craft materials, processes, or techniques.

== History ==
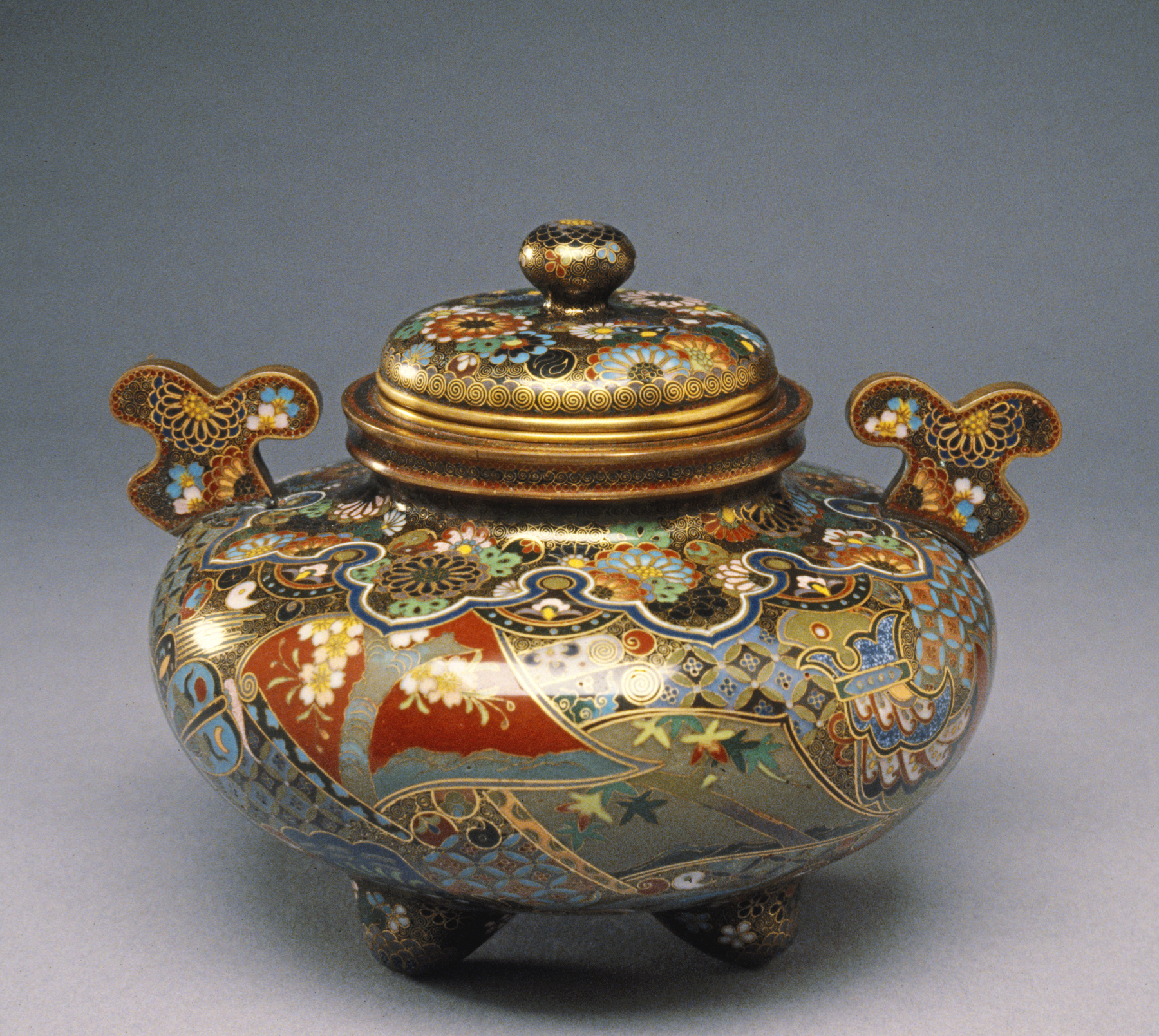
Cloisonné incense burner with brocade pattern by Takahara Komajiro, Meiji era, Walters Art Museum (1880s)

Japanese craft dates back to the earliest human settlement of the islands. Handicrafting in Japan has its roots in the rural crafts and the material-goods necessities of ancient times. Traditionally, artisans used naturally and indigenously occurring materials, and objects were created to be used, not just to be displayed. As such, the border between art and craft is not always clearly defined. Crafts were needed by all strata of society and became increasingly sophisticated in their design and execution. Craft had close ties to folk art, but developed into fine art, with a number of aesthetic schools of thought, such as wabi-sabi, arising. Craftsmen and women therefore became artisans with increasing sophistication. However, wares were not just produced for domestic consumption, but at some point items such as ceramics made by studio craft were produced for export and became an important pillar of the economy.

Family affiliations or bloodlines are of special importance to the aristocracy and the transmission of religious beliefs in various Buddhist schools. In Buddhism, the use of the term "bloodlines" likely relates to a liquid metaphor used in the sutras: the decantation of teachings from one "dharma vessel" to another, describing the full and correct transference of doctrine from master to disciple. Similarly, in the art world, the process of passing down knowledge and experience formed the basis of familial lineages. For ceramic, metal, lacquer, and bamboo craftsmen, this acquisition of knowledge usually involved a lengthy apprenticeship with the master of the workshop, often the father of the young disciple, from one generation to the next. In this system called dentō (伝 統), traditions were passed down within a teacher-student relationship (師弟, shitei). It encompassed strict rules that had to be observed in order to enable learning and teaching of a way (dō (道)). The wisdom could be taught either orally (denshō (伝承)), or in writing (densho (伝書)). Living in the master's household and participating in household duties, apprentices carefully observed the master, senior students, and workshop before beginning any actual training. Even in the later stages of an apprenticeship, it was common for a disciple to learn only through conscientious observation. Apprenticeship required hard work from the pupil almost every day in exchange for little or no pay. It was quite common that mastery in certain crafts were passed down within the family from one generation to the next, establishing veritable dynasties. In that case the established master's name was assumed instead of the personal one. Should there be an absence of a male heir, a relative or a student could be adopted in order to continue the line and assume the prestigious name.

With the end of the Edo period and the advent of the modern Meiji era, industrial production was introduced; western objects and styles were copied and started replacing the old. On the fine art level, patrons such as feudal daimyō lords were unable to support local artisans as much as they had done in the past. Although handmade Japanese craft was once the dominant source of objects used in daily life, modern era industrial production as well as importation from abroad sidelined it in the economy. Traditional craft began to wane, and disappeared in many areas, as tastes and production methods changed. Forms such as swordmaking became obsolete. Japanese scholar Okakura Kakuzō wrote against the fashionable primacy of western art and founded the periodical Kokka (國華, lit. 'Flower of the Nation') to draw attention to the issue. Specific crafts that had been practiced for centuries were increasingly under threat, while others that were more recent developments introduced from the west, such as glassmaking, saw a rise.

=== 20th century ===
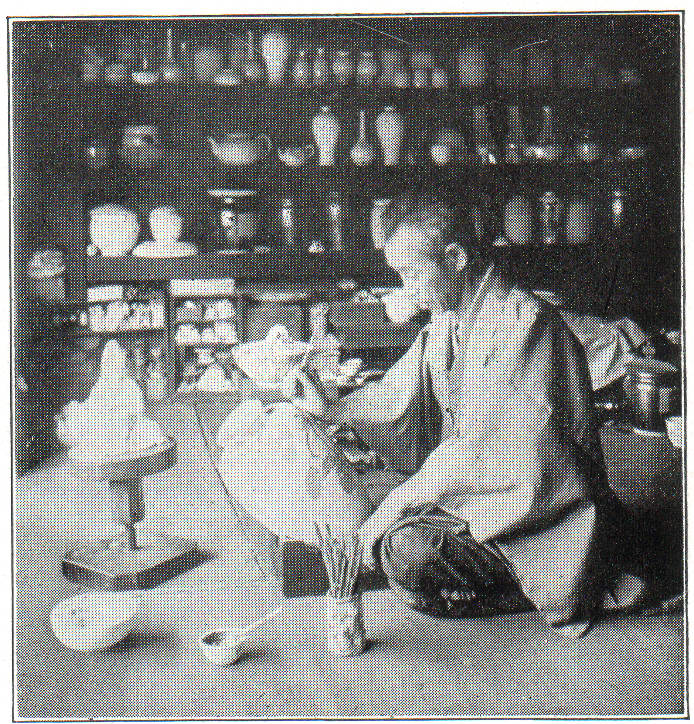
Application of painted decoration, porcelain workshop, Kyoto (1914)

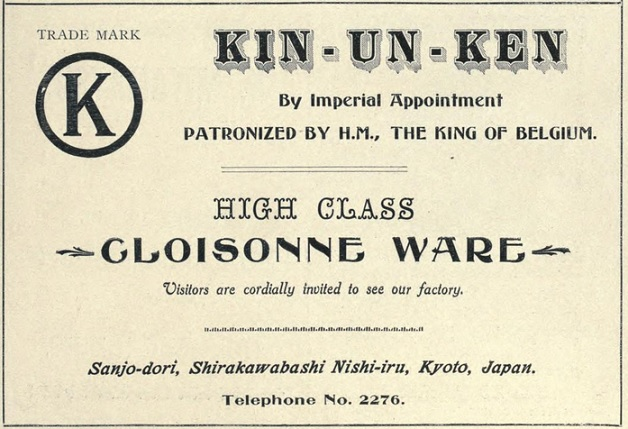
Advertisement for the Kin'unken cloisonné company, Kyoto (c. 1910)

Although these objects were designated as National Treasures – placing them under the protection of the imperial government – it took some time for their cultural value to be fully recognized. In order to further protect traditional craft and arts, the government, in 1890, instituted the guild of Imperial Household Artists (帝室技芸員, Teishitsu Gigei-in), who were specially appointed to create works of art for the Tokyo Imperial Palace and other imperial residences. These artists were considered most famous and prestigious and worked in the areas such as painting, ceramics, and lacquerware. Although this system of patronage offered them some kind of protection, craftsmen and women on the folk art level were left exposed. One reaction to this development was the mingei (民芸, "folk arts" or "arts of the people") – the folk art movement that developed in the late 1920s and 1930s, whose founding father was Yanagi Sōetsu (1889–1961). The philosophical pillar of mingei was "hand-crafted art of ordinary people" (民衆的な工芸, minshū-teki-na kōgei). Yanagi Sōetsu discovered beauty in everyday ordinary and utilitarian objects created by nameless and unknown craftspersons.

The Second World War left the country devastated and as a result, craft suffered. The government introduced a new program known as Living National Treasure to recognise and protect craftspeople (both individually and as groups) on the fine and folk art level. Inclusion in the list came with financial support for the training of new generations of artisans so that the art forms could continue. In 1950, the national government instituted the intangible cultural properties classification, which is given to cultural property considered of high historical or artistic value in terms of the craft technique. The term refers exclusively to the human skill possessed by individuals or groups, which are indispensable in producing cultural property. It also took further steps: in 2009, for example, the government inscribed yūki-tsumugi into the UNESCO Intangible Cultural Heritage Lists. Prefectural governments, as well as those on the municipal level, also have their own system of recognising and protecting local craft (meibutsu). Although the government has taken these steps, private sector artisans continue to face challenges trying to stay true to tradition whilst at the same time interpreting old forms and creating new ideas in order to survive and remain relevant to customers. They also face the dilemma of an ageing society wherein knowledge is not passed down to enough pupils of the younger generation, which means dentō teacher-pupil relationships within families break down if a successor is not found.

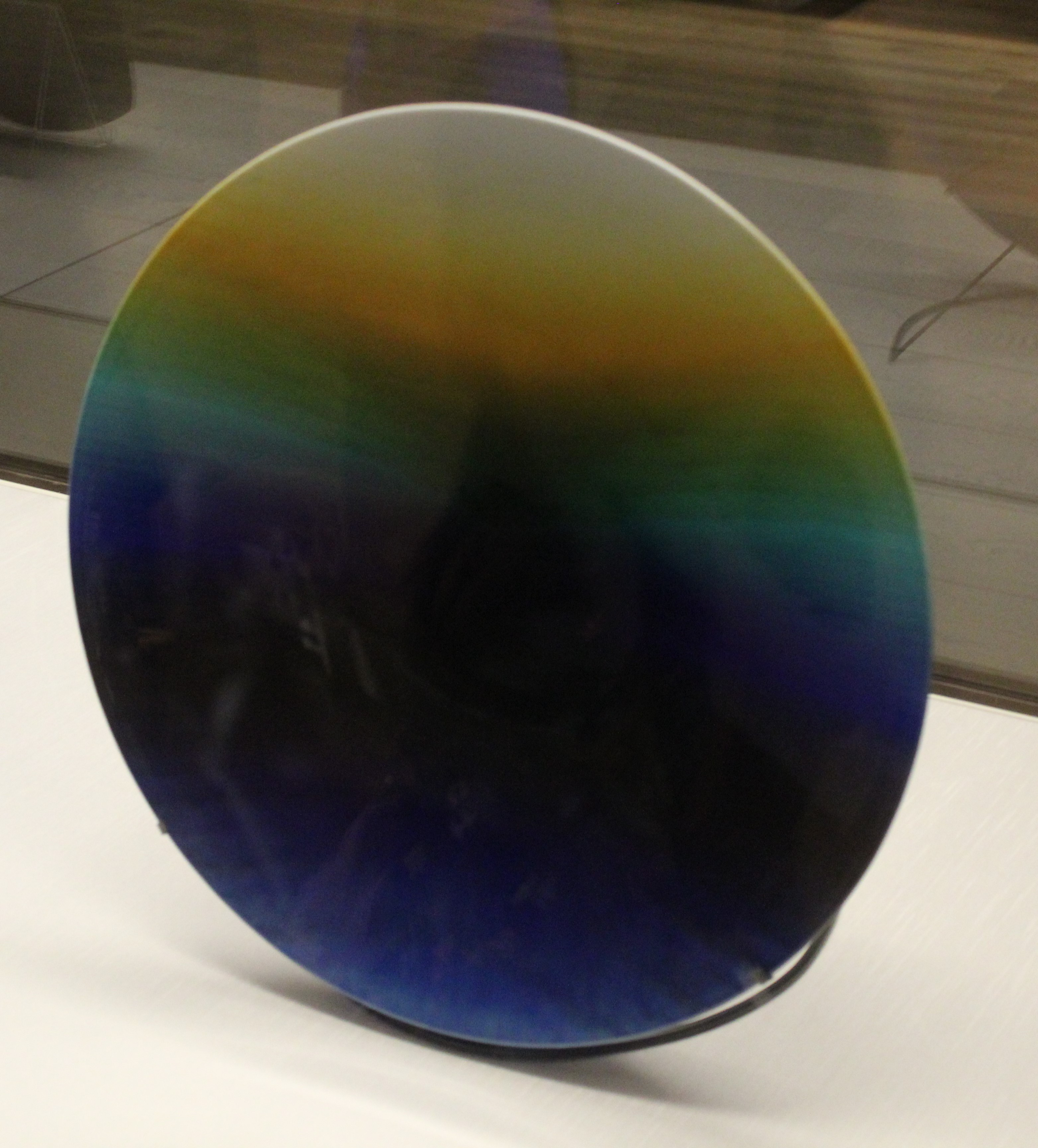
Dawn by Tokuda Yasokichi III (1992)

As societal rules changed and became more relaxed, the traditional patriarchal system has been forced to undergo changes as well. In the past, males were predominantly the holders of "master" titles in the most prestigious crafts. Ceramist Tokuda Yasokichi IV was the first female to succeed her father, Tokuda Yasokichi III, as a master, since he did not have any sons and was unwilling to adopt a male heir. Despite modernisation and westernisation, a number of art forms still exist, partly due to their close connection to certain traditions: examples include the Japanese tea ceremony, ikebana, and to a certain degree, martial arts (in the case of sword making).

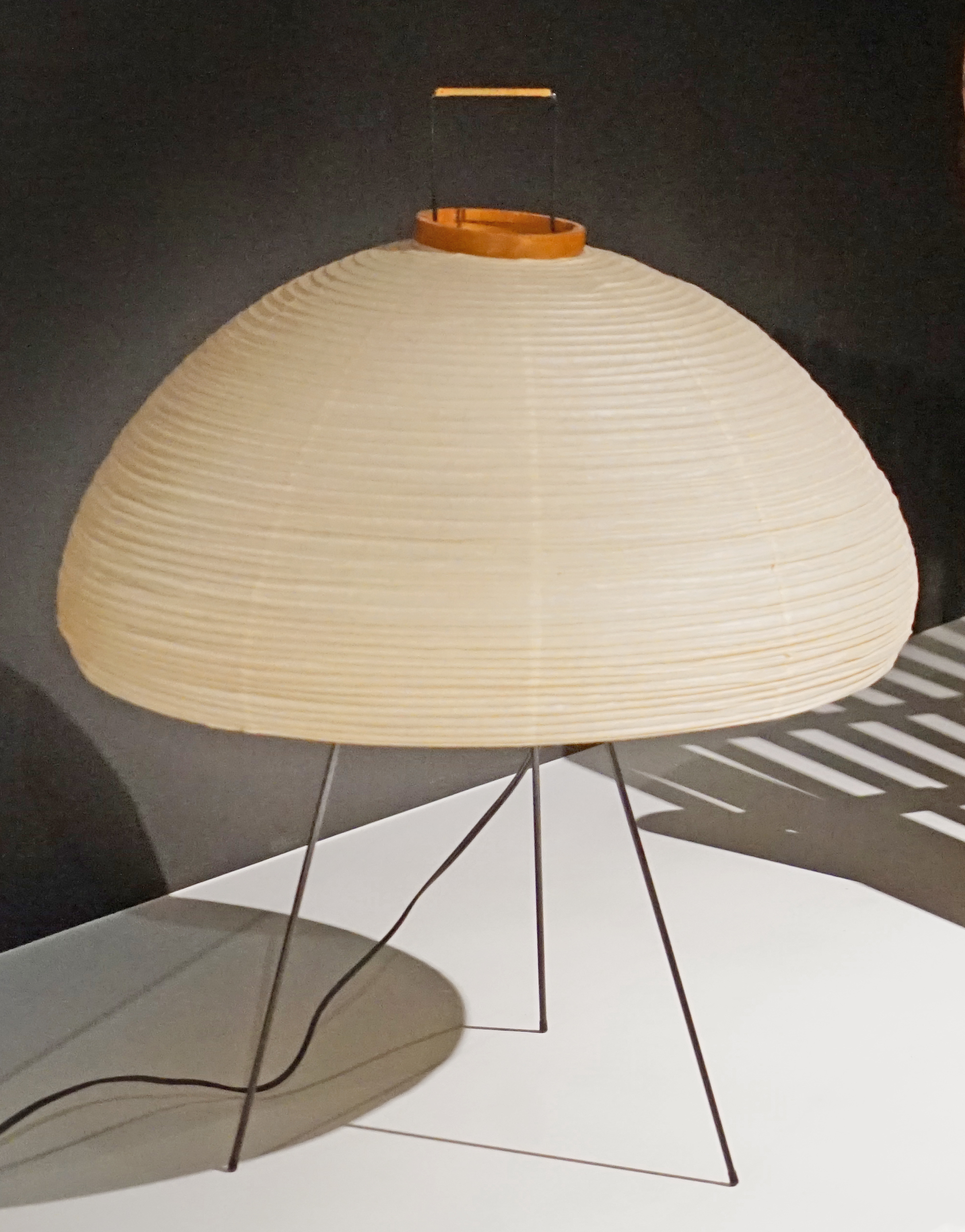
Akari light sculpture model 10A by Isamu Noguchi (1951)

In the 1950s the mayor of Gifu invited Isamu Noguchi to help revitalise the declining local Washi paper industry. The collaboration led to the artist's reinterpretation and modernisation of traditional Akari lanterns. Noguchi reimagined the lamps using wire in addition to the traditional wood and paper for the structure, and electric lightbulbs rather than candles. The resulting Akari light sculptures (光の彫刻, hikari no chōkoku), as the artist called them, could be easily flattened and shipped, and were an immediate commercial success in Japan and worldwide. The lamps are still handmade in Gifu by the original manufacturer, Ozeki & Co.

=== Contemporary practice ===
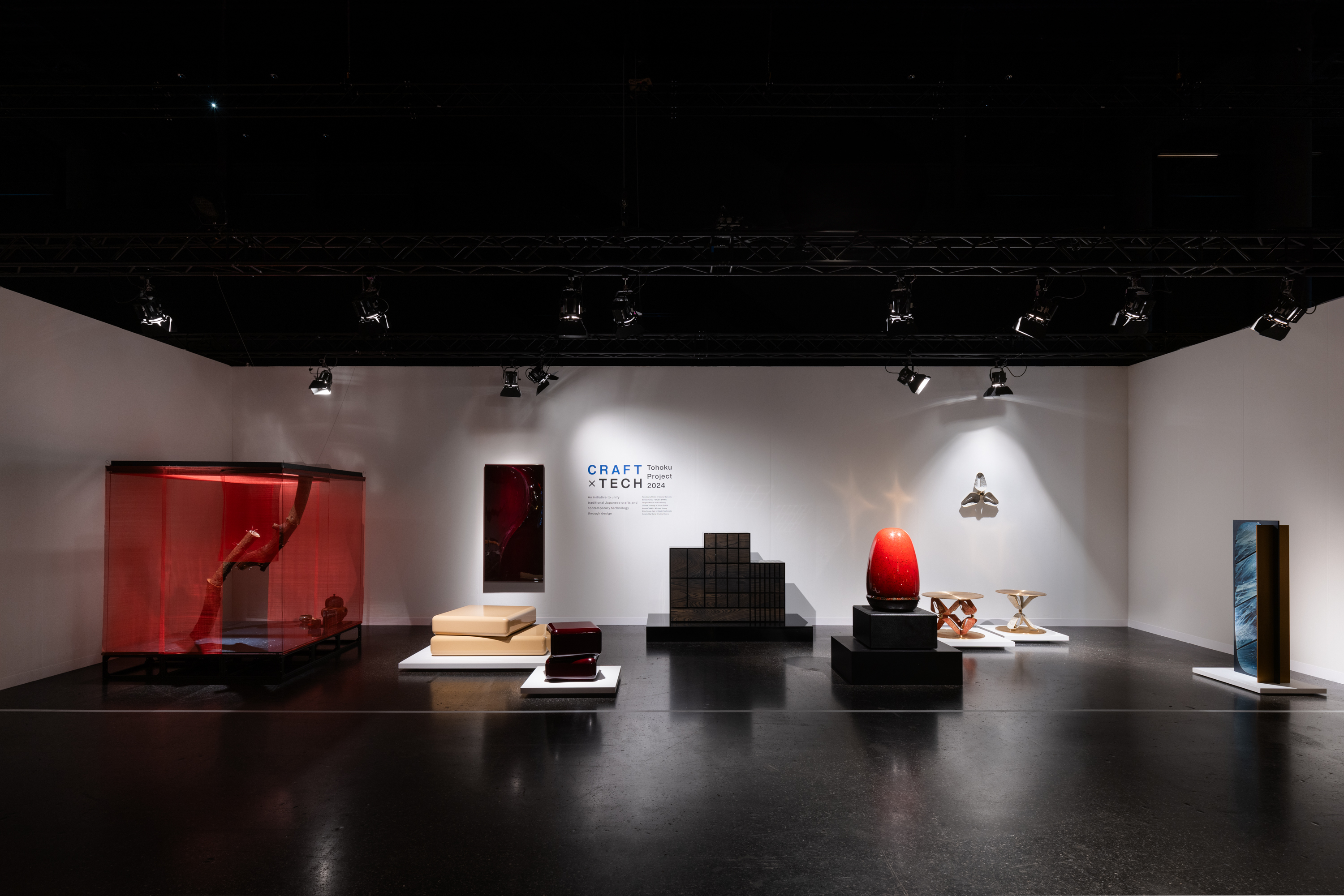
Craft x Tech Tohoku Project exhibition at Design Miami Art Basel (2024)

The Japan Traditional Kōgei Exhibition (日本伝統工芸展) takes place every year with the aim of reaching out to the public. In 2015, the Museum of Arts and Design in New York exhibited a number of modern kōgei artists in an effort to introduce Japanese craft to an international audience. In 2020 the Victoria and Albert Museum exhibition Kimono: Kyoto to Catwalk "presented the kimono as a dynamic and constantly evolving icon of fashion." The show, which was described as "a revelation" and "unmissable", was subsequently displayed at the V&A Dundee.

More recent exhibitions and initiatives such as the ORIGIN of SIMPLICITY at the ADI Design Museum in Milan, Nendo sees Kyoto at the Friedman Benda gallery in New York, the Craft x Tech Tohoku Project andTokai Project, as well as Distillation of Architecture at the Architectural Association in London have set out to both preserve these unique craft traditions and bring them to a wider audience by introducing modern technologies and instigating collaborations with Japanese and international artists, architects, and designers such as Kengo Kuma, Sabine Marcelis, Yoichi Ochiai, Oki Sato, Schemata Architects, Studio SWINE, Atang Tshikare, and Bethan Laura Wood. These initiatives have taken diverse approaches to the overall question of how the ancient "aesthetic sensibilities embedded in Japanese craft can be reimagined" through the lens of contemporary design and technology so that they continue to exist and remain relevant in the future.

Other initiatives and promotional activities highlighting the contemporary practice and relevance of Japanese craft traditions include collaborations with Japanese and international luxury brands, exhibitions such as international art, craft, and design fairs, and events such the Osaka-Kansai Expo 2025.

== Ceramics ==
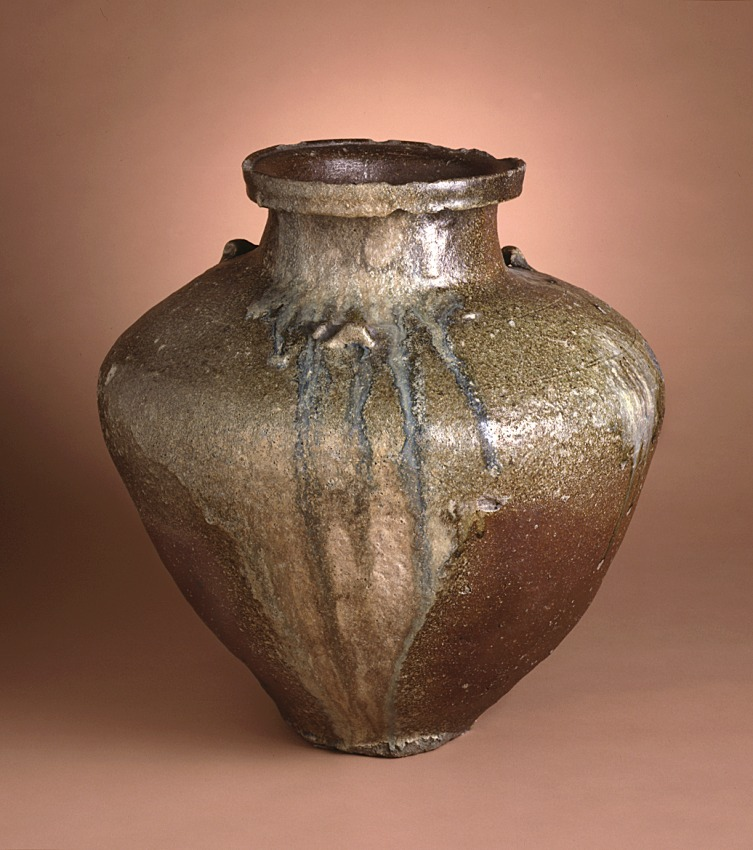
Coil-built Tokoname stoneware with ash glaze, Kamakura period, Los Angeles County Museum of Art (c. 1200–1400)

Japanese pottery and porcelain, one of the country's oldest art forms, dates back to the Neolithic period. Kilns have produced earthenware, pottery, stoneware, glazed pottery, glazed stoneware, porcelain, and blue-and-white ware. Japan has an exceptionally long and successful history of ceramic production. Earthenware was created as early as the Jōmon period (10,000–300 BC), giving Japan one of the oldest ceramic traditions in the world. Japan is further distinguished by the unusual esteem that ceramics holds within its artistic tradition, owing to the enduring popularity of the tea ceremony.

Some of the recognised techniques of Japanese ceramic craft are:

- Iro-e (色絵, colour painting)
- Neriage (練上げ, using different colours of clay together)
- Sansai (三彩, three colours of brown, green, and a creamy off-white)
- Saiyū (彩釉, glaze technique with dripping effect)
- Seihakuji (青白磁, a form of blue-white hakuji porcelain)
- Sometsuke (染付, blue and white pottery)
- Tetsu-e (鉄絵, (also known as Tetsugusuri), iron glazing)
- Yūri-kinsai (釉裏金彩, metal-leaf application)
- Zōgan (象嵌, damascening and champlevé)

There are many different types of Japanese ware. Those more identified as being close to the craft movement include:

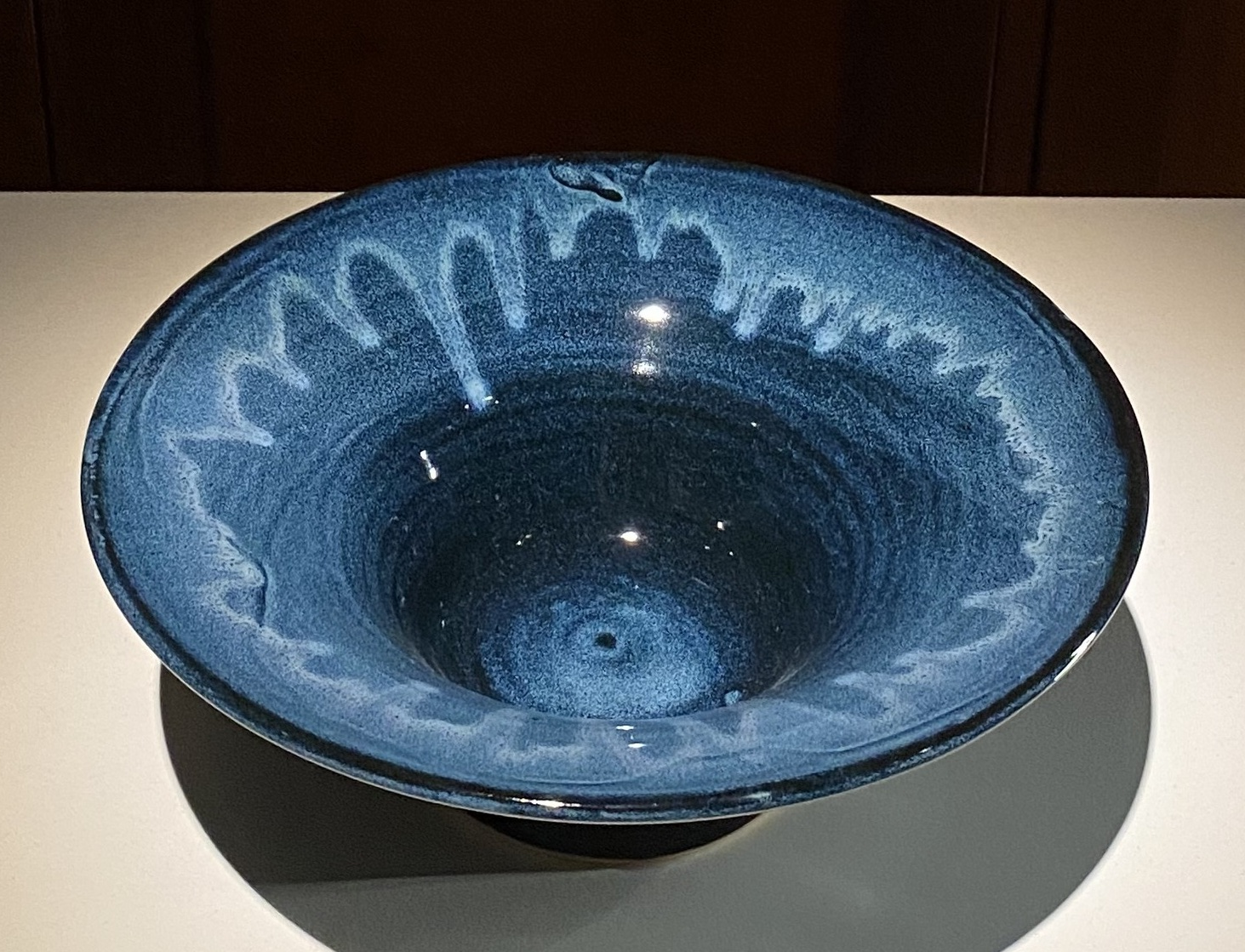
Aizuhongō ware bowl, Craft x Tech Tohoku Project exhibition, V&A (2024)

- Aizuhongō ware (会津本郷焼), from Aizu in Fukushima Prefecture
- Bizen ware (備前焼), from Imbe in Bizen province
- Echizen ware (越前焼), from Echizen, Odacho, and Miyazaki in Fukui Prefecture
- Hagi ware (萩焼), from Hagi, Yamaguchi prefecture
- Hasami ware (波佐見焼), from Hasami, Nagasaki prefecture
- Kakiemon (柿右衛門), porcelain developed by Sakaida Kakiemon in Arita, Saga prefecture
- Karatsu ware (唐津焼), from Karatsu, Saga prefecture
- Kutani ware (九谷焼), from Kutani, Ishikawa prefecture
- Mashiko ware (益子焼), from Mashiko, Tochigi prefecture
- Mumyōi ware (無名異焼), from Sado, Niigata prefecture
- Ōborisōma ware (大堀相馬焼), from the Hamadōri area of Fukushima Prefecture
- Onta ware (小鹿田焼), from Onta, Ōita prefecture
- Setoguro (瀬戸黒), from Seto, Aichi prefecture
- Shigaraki ware (信楽焼), from Shigaraki, Shiga prefecture
- Shino ware (志野焼), from Mino province
- Tokoname ware (常滑焼), from Tokoname, Aichi prefecture
- Tsuboya ware (壺屋焼), from Ryūkyū Islands

== Textiles ==
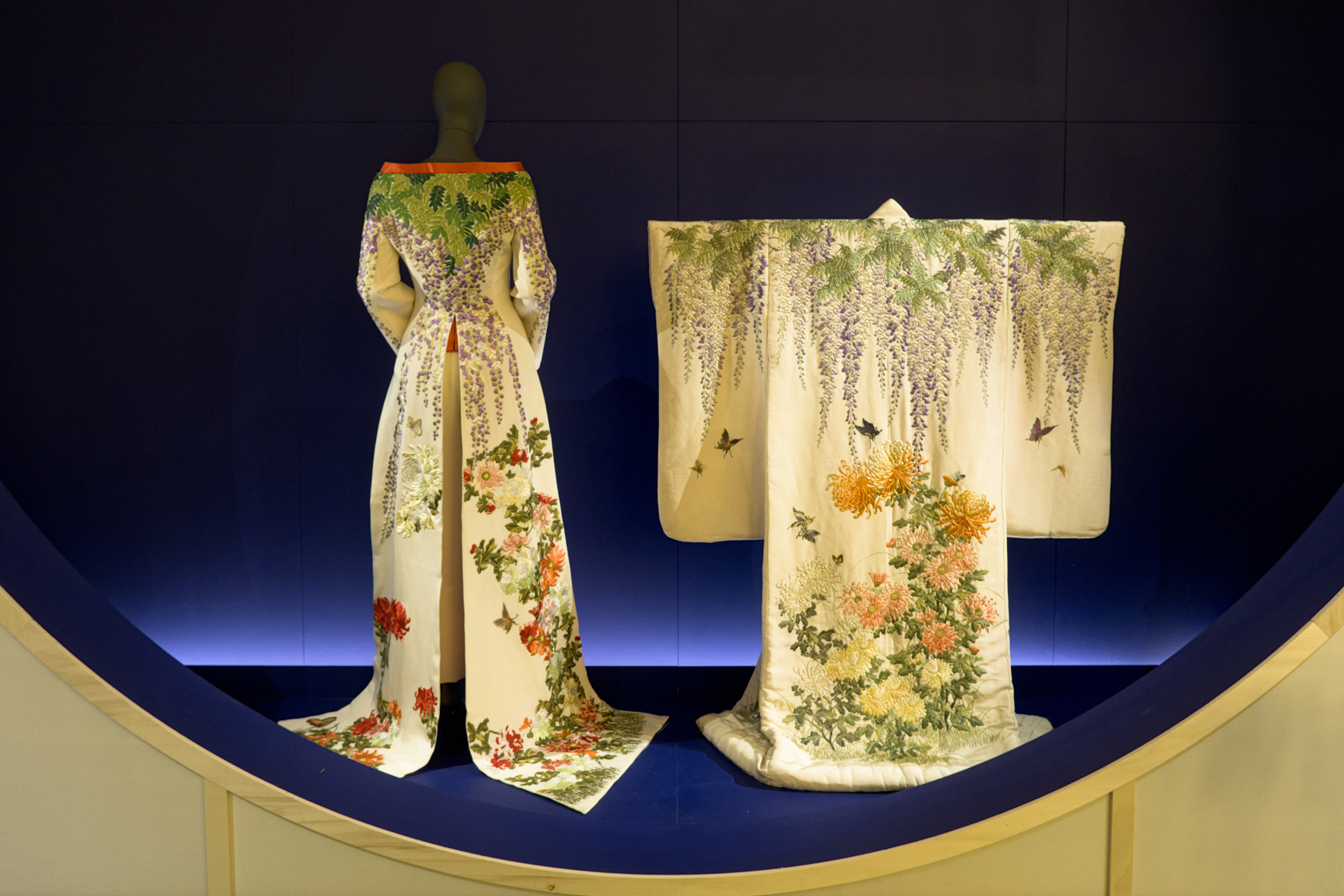
Trouser suit and kimono, Kyoto to Catwalk exhibition, V&A Dundee (2024)

Textile crafts include silk, hemp, linen and cotton woven, dyed and embroidered into various forms—from crafts originating from folk designs to complex silk weaves intended for the upper classes.

Village crafts that evolved from ancient folk traditions also continued in the form of weaving and indigo dyeing—by the Ainu people of Hokkaidō (whose distinctive designs have prehistoric prototypes) and by other remote farming families in northern Japan.

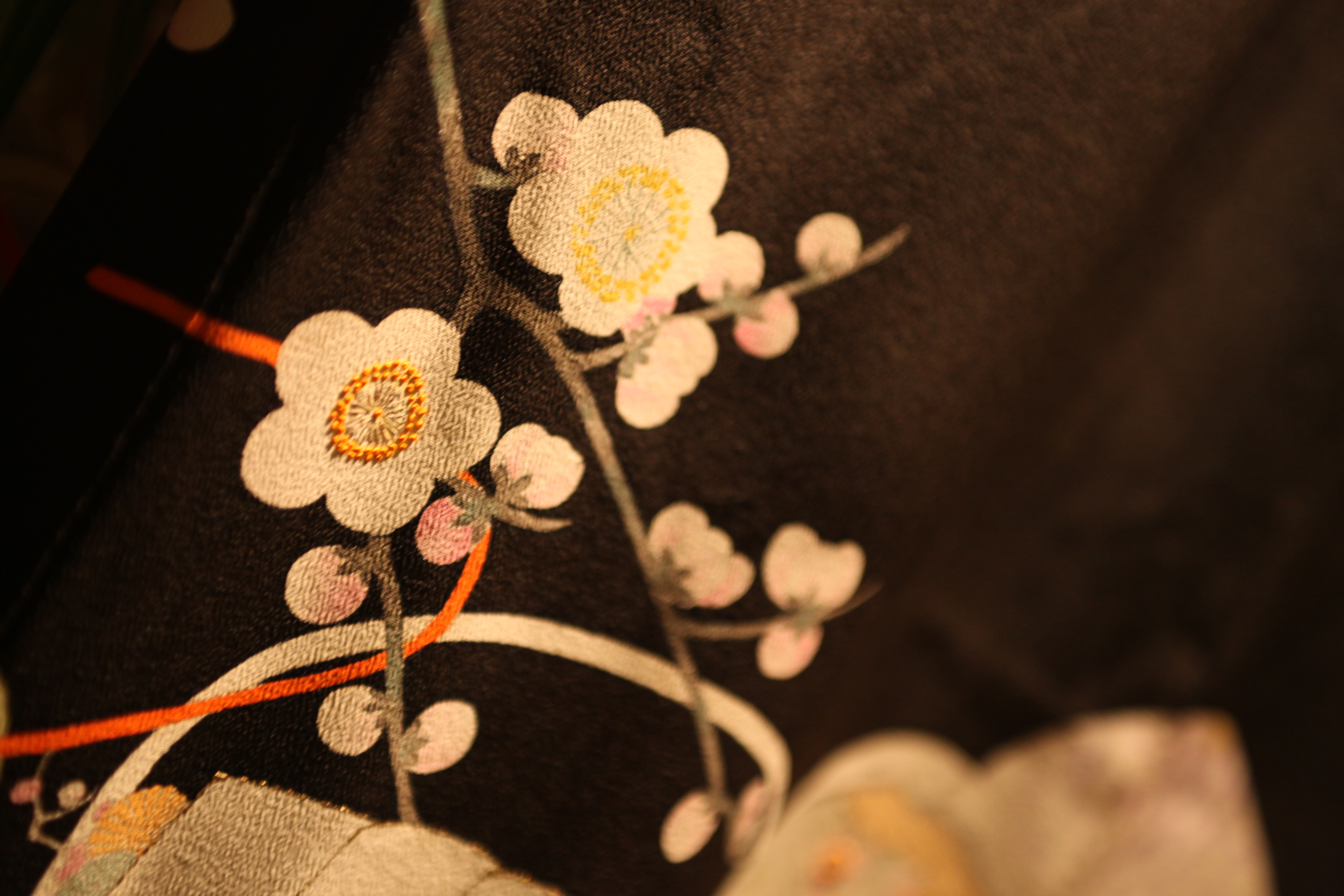
Yūzen detail of a kimono

Traditional craft textiles are typically used primarily for Japanese clothing, such as long, thin bolts of cloth (tanmono) used to sew kimono, yukata and furisode, as well as other types of kimono. Historically, these textiles would have been used to sew the kosode (the historic precursor to the kimono). They are also used to sew obi, the sash worn with a kimono. Accessories such as kanzashi are also commonly made from textiles such as kinsha and chirimen (smooth crêpe and textured crêpe respectively). Traditional footwear, such as geta, zōri and okobo, also use textiles in the form of hanao, the fabric thongs used to hold the shoe on the foot; some okobo also feature brocade fabric around the body of the shoe.

The different techniques for dyeing designs onto fabric are:

- Yūzen (友禅染)
- Katazome (型絵染)
- Edo komon (江戸小紋)
- Nagaita chugata (長板中形)
- Mokuhan-zome (木版染)
- Tsujigahana
- Shibori

Some weaving techniques are:

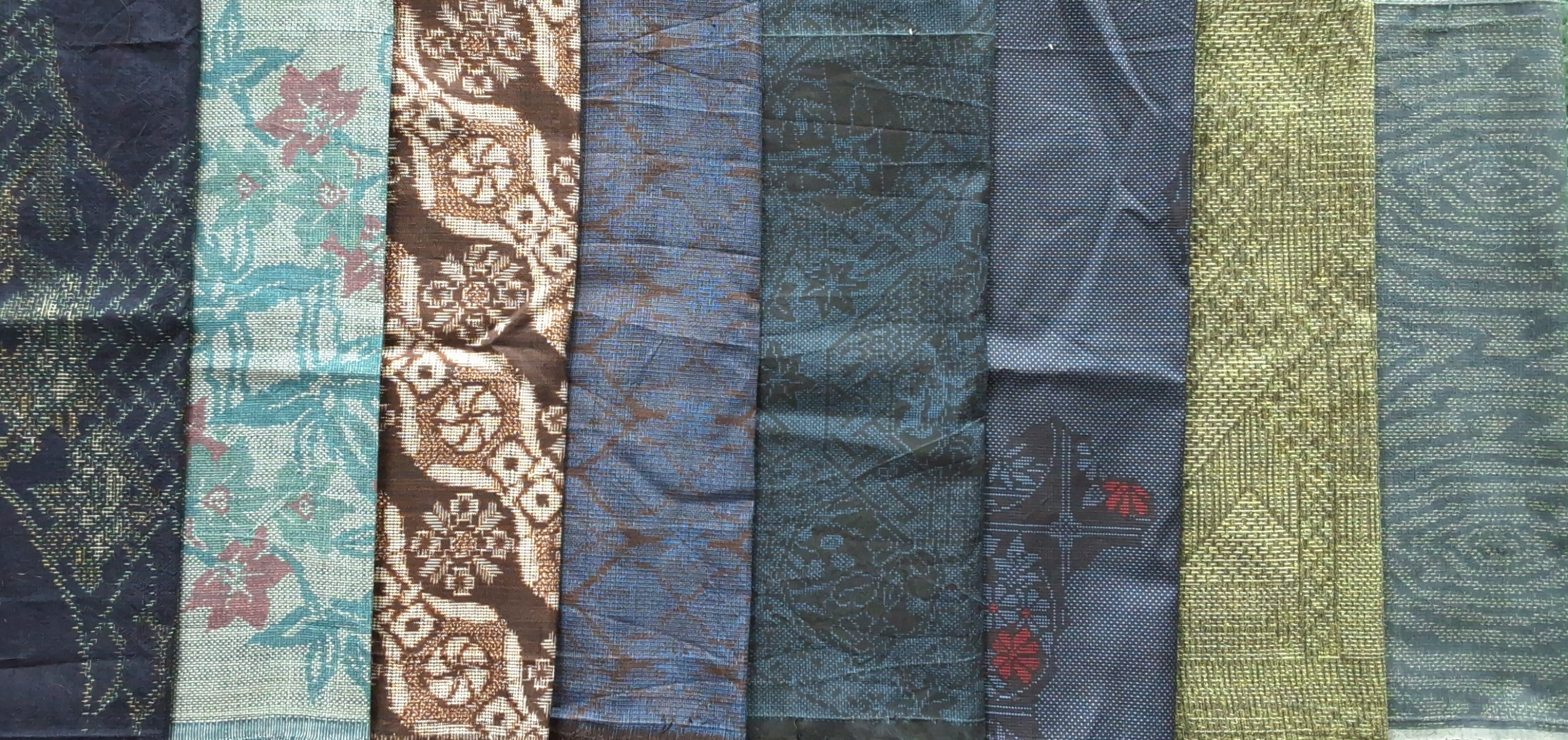
Various patterned tsumugi fabrics

- Kasuri (絣織)
- Tsumugi (紬織)
- Echigi-jōfu (越後上布)
- Saga Nishiki (佐賀錦)

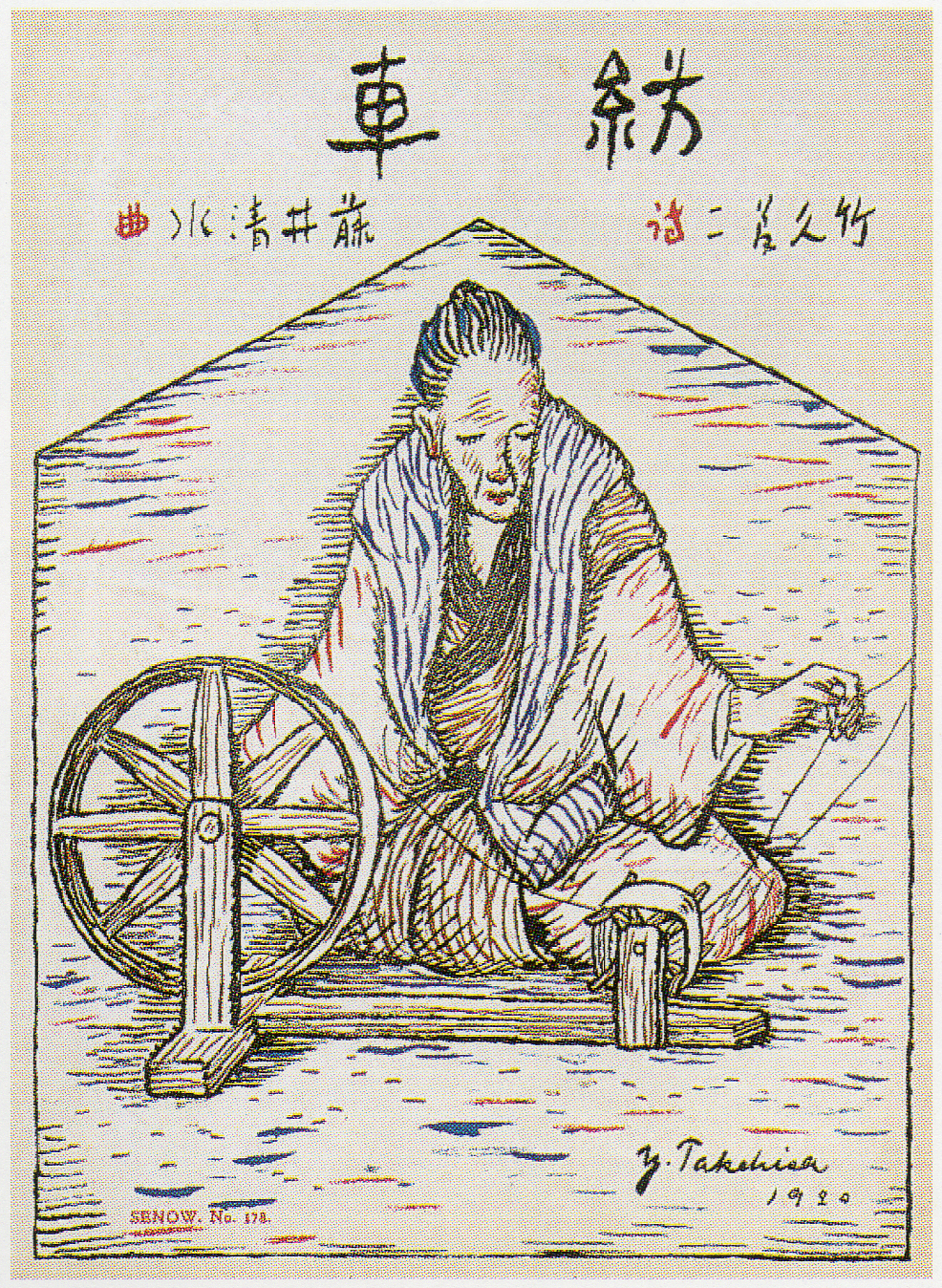
Yumeji Takehisa, Senowo spinning wheel, 1920

Amongst the more well-known regional textiles are:

- Nishijin-ori (西陣織), silk brocade using flosting yarns and gilt paper from the Nishijin district of Kyoto
- Yūki-tsumugi (結城紬), a variety of tsumugi from Yūki, Ibaraki prefecture
- Kumejima-tsumugi (久米島紬), a variety of tsumugi from Kumejima, Okinawa
- Kagayūzen (加賀友禅), a dyeing techniwue from Kaga, Ishikawa prefecture
- Kyōyūzen (京友禅), a dyeing technique from Kyoto
- Bingata, a stencil-dye technique from the Ryukyuan Islands

Other techniques include kumihimo (組紐) braid making, and kogin zashi (こぎん刺し), a form of sashiko embroidery.

== Lacquerware ==
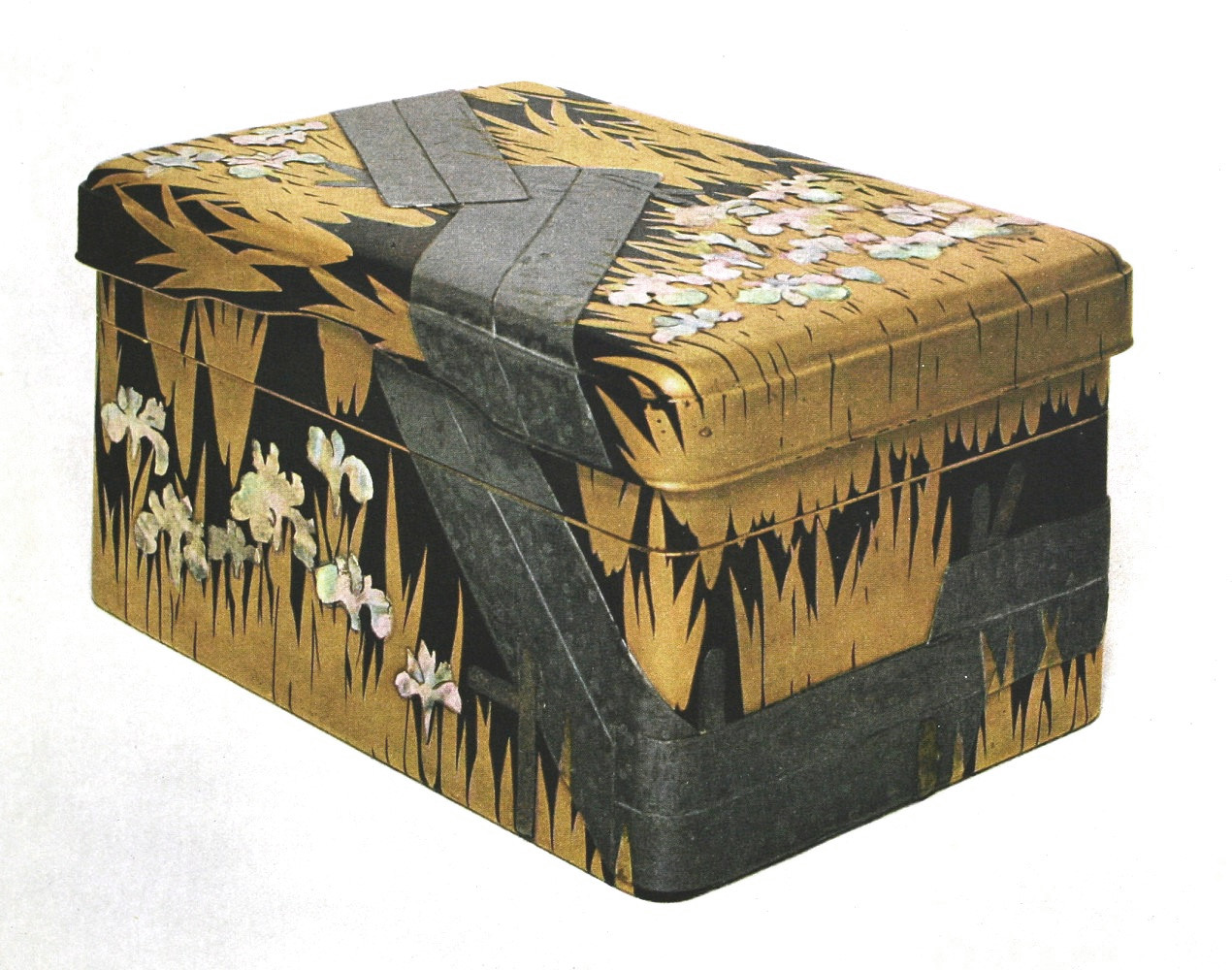
Writing lacquer box by Ogata Kōrin, Edo period, Tokyo National Museum (18th century)

The art of Japanese lacquerware can be traced to prehistoric artefacts. Japanese lacquerware is most often employed on wooden objects, which receive multiple layers of refined lac juices, each of which must dry before the next is applied. These layers make a tough skin impervious to water damage and resistant to breakage, providing lightweight, easy-to-clean utensils of every sort. The decoration on such lacquers, whether carved through different-colored layers or in surface designs, applied with gold or inlaid with precious substances, has been a prized art form since the Nara period (710–94 AD).

Items produced using lacquer are used for daily necessities like bowls and trays, but also for tea ceremony utensils such as chaki (tea caddies) and kōgō (incense containers). Items also decorated with lacquer, and used more commonly in the past, include netsuke and inrō.

Japanese lacquerware is closely entwined with wood and bamboo work; the base material is usually wood, but bamboo (藍胎, rantai) or linen (乾漆, kanshitsu) can also be used.

The different techniques used in the application and decoration of lacquer are:

- Urushi-e (漆絵), which is the oldest and most basic decorative technique
- Maki-e (蒔絵)
- Raden (螺鈿)
- Chinkin (沈金)
- Kinma (蒟醤)
- Choshitsu (彫漆)
- Hiramon (平文)
- Rankaku (卵殻)
- Kamakura-bori (鎌倉彫)

Amongst the more well-known types of lacquerware are:

- Wajima-nuri (輪島塗), lacquerware from Wajima, Ishikawa prefecture
- Tsugaru-nuri (津軽塗), lacquerware from Tsugaru region around Hirosaki, Aomori prefecture

== Wood and bamboo ==
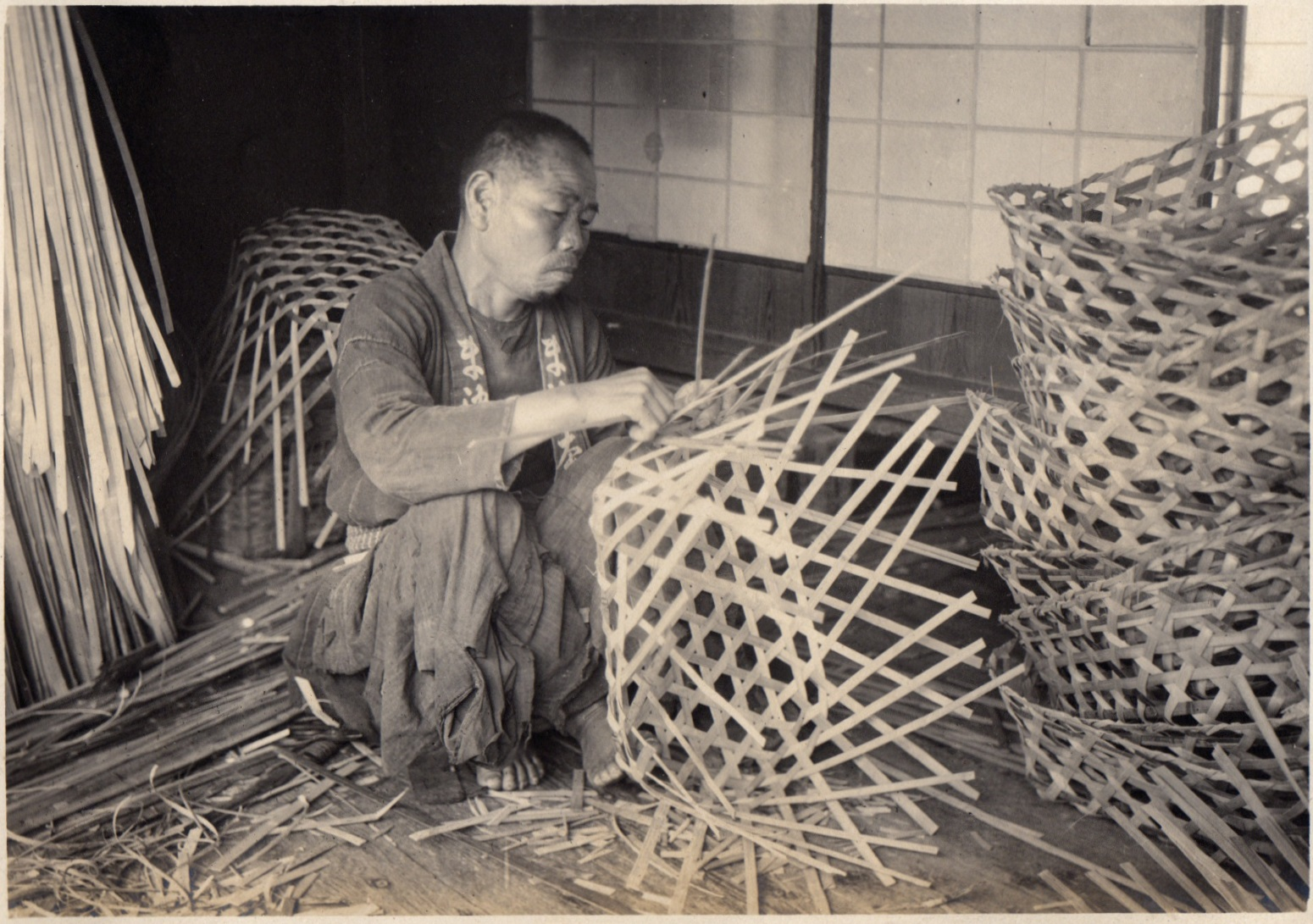
Basket weaver working with kagome pattern (1915)

The kagome weaving lattice

Wood and bamboo have always had a place in Japanese architecture and art due to the abundance of available materials, resulting in the long tradition of Japanese carpentry. Both secular and religious buildings were and are made out of wood, as well as items used in the household, typically dishes and boxes.

Other traditions of woodwork include yosegi (Japanese marquetry work) and the making of furniture such as tansu. Japanese tea ceremony is closely entwined with the practices of bamboo crafts (for spoons) and woodwork and lacquerware (for natsume).

Types of woodwork include:

- Sashimono (指物)
- Kurimono (刳物)
- Hikimono (挽物)
- Magemono (曲物)

Japanese bamboowork implements are produced for tea ceremonies, ikebana flower arrangement and interior goods. The types of bamboowork are:

- Amimono (編物)
- Kumimono (組物)

The art of Japanese bamboo weaving in patterns such as kagome (籠目) is well known; its name is composed from the words kago (basket) and me (eyes), referring to the pattern of holes found in kagome, where laths woven in three directions (horizontally, diagonally left and diagonally right) create a pattern of trihexagonal tiling. The weaving process gives the kagome pattern a chiral wallpaper group symmetry of p6 (632).

Other materials such as reeds are also used in the broad category of Japanese woodwork. Neko chigura is a traditional form of weaving basket for cats.

Amongst the more well-known varieties of miscellaneous woodwork are:

- Hakoneyosegizaiku (箱根寄木細工), wooden marquetry from Hakone, Ashigarashimo district, and Odawara, Kanagawa prefecture
- Iwayadotansu (岩谷堂箪笥), wooden chests of drawers, from Oshu, Iwate prefecture

== Metalwork ==
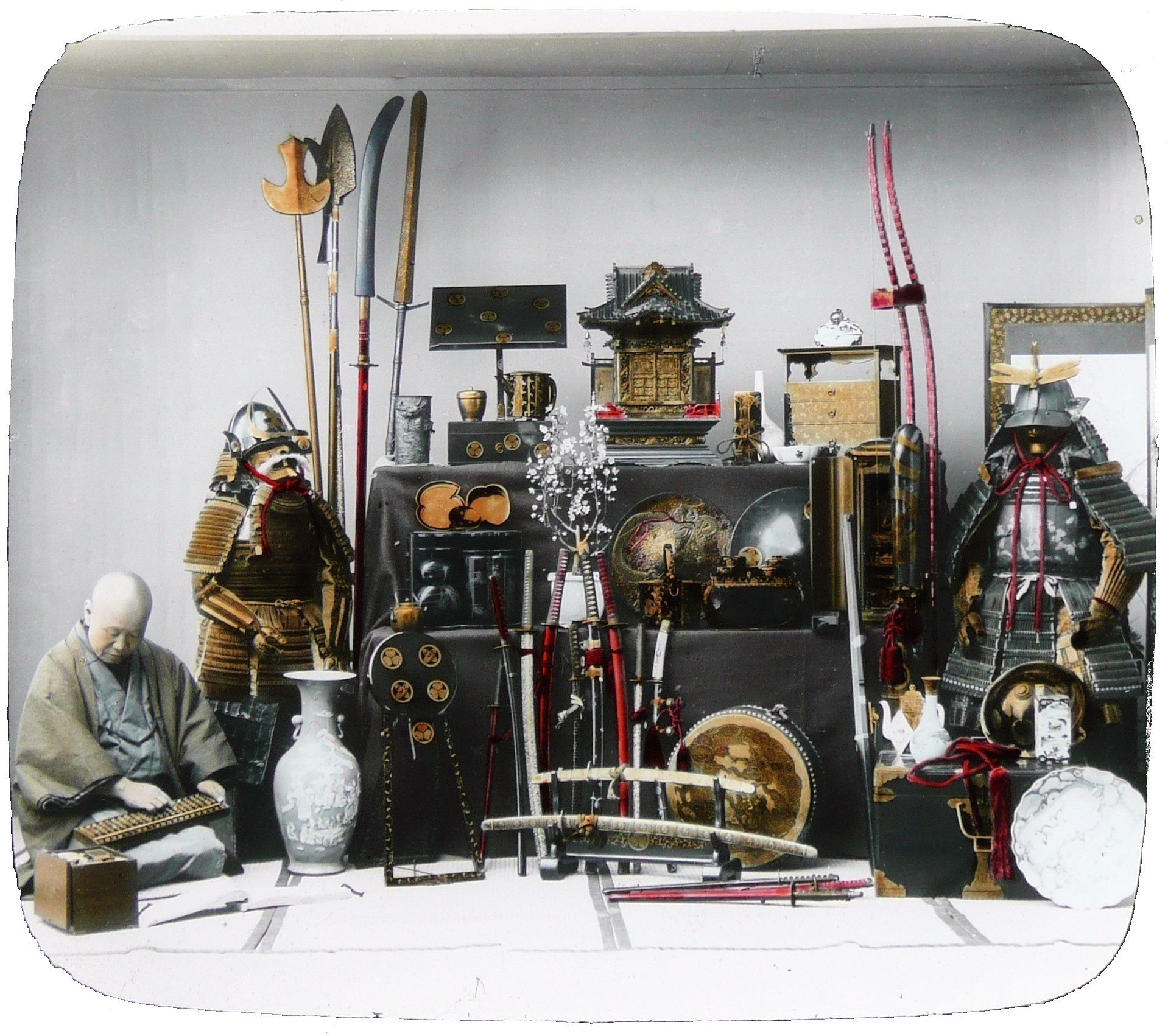
Assorted armour, swords, and other weapons and related accoutrements photographed by T. Enami (early 1890s)

Early Japanese iron-working techniques date back to the 3rd to 2nd century BC. Japanese swordsmithing is of extremely high quality and greatly valued; swordsmithing in Japan originated before the 1st century BC, and reached the height of its popularity as the chief possession of warlords and samurai. Swordsmithing is considered a separate artform from iron- and metalworking, and has moved beyond the craft it once started out as.

Outside of swordsmithing, a number of items for daily use were historically made out of metal, resulting in the development of metalworking outside of the production of weaponry.

Traditional metal casting techniques include:

- Rogata (蝋型)
- Sogata (惣型)
- Komegata (込型)

Smithing (鍛金), the technique of shaping metal items through beating them with a hammer, is also used in traditional Japanese metalwork.

Arguably the most important Japanese metalworking technique is forge welding (鍛接), the joining of two pieces of metal—typically iron and carbon steel—by heating them to a high temperature and hammering them together, or forcing them together by other means. Forge welding is commonly used to make tools such as chisels and planes. One of the most famous areas for its use of forge welding is Yoita, Nagaoka City, located in Niigata prefecture, where a technique known as Echigo Yoita Uchihamono (越後与板打刃物) is used.

To create various patterns on the surface of a piece of metal, metal carving is used to apply decorative designs. The techniques include carving (彫り), metal inlay (象嵌), and embossing (打ち出し).

Amongst the more well-known types of Japanese metalware are:

- Nambutekki (南部鉄器), ironware from Morioka and Oshu, Iwate prefecture
- Takaoka Doki (高岡銅器), copperware from Takaoka, Toyama prefecture

== Dolls ==
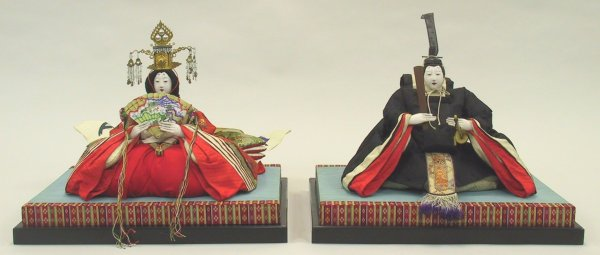
Hinamatsuri dolls of the emperor and empress

There are various types of traditional Japanese dolls (人形, ningyō; lit. 'human form'), some representing children and babies, some representing the imperial court, warriors and heroes, fairy-tale characters, gods and (rarely) demons, and also everyday people. Many types of ningyō have a long tradition and are still made today, for household shrines, formal gift-giving, or for festival celebrations such as Hinamatsuri, the doll festival, or Kodomo no Hi, Children's Day. Some are manufactured as a local craft, to be purchased by pilgrims as a souvenir of a temple visit or some other trip.

There are four different basic types of doll, based on their base material:

- Wooden dolls (木彫人形)
- Toso dolls (桐塑人形), made out of toso, a substance made out of paulownia sawdust mixed with paste that creates a clay-like substance
- Harinuki dolls (張抜人形), made out of papier-mache
- Totai dolls (陶胎人形), made out of ceramic

The painting or application techniques are:

- Nunobari (布貼り)
- Kimekomi (木目込み)
- Hamekomi (嵌込み)
- Kamibari (紙貼り)
- Saishiki (彩色)
- Saicho (彩彫)

One well-known type of ningyō is Hakata ningyō (博多人形).

== Paper making ==
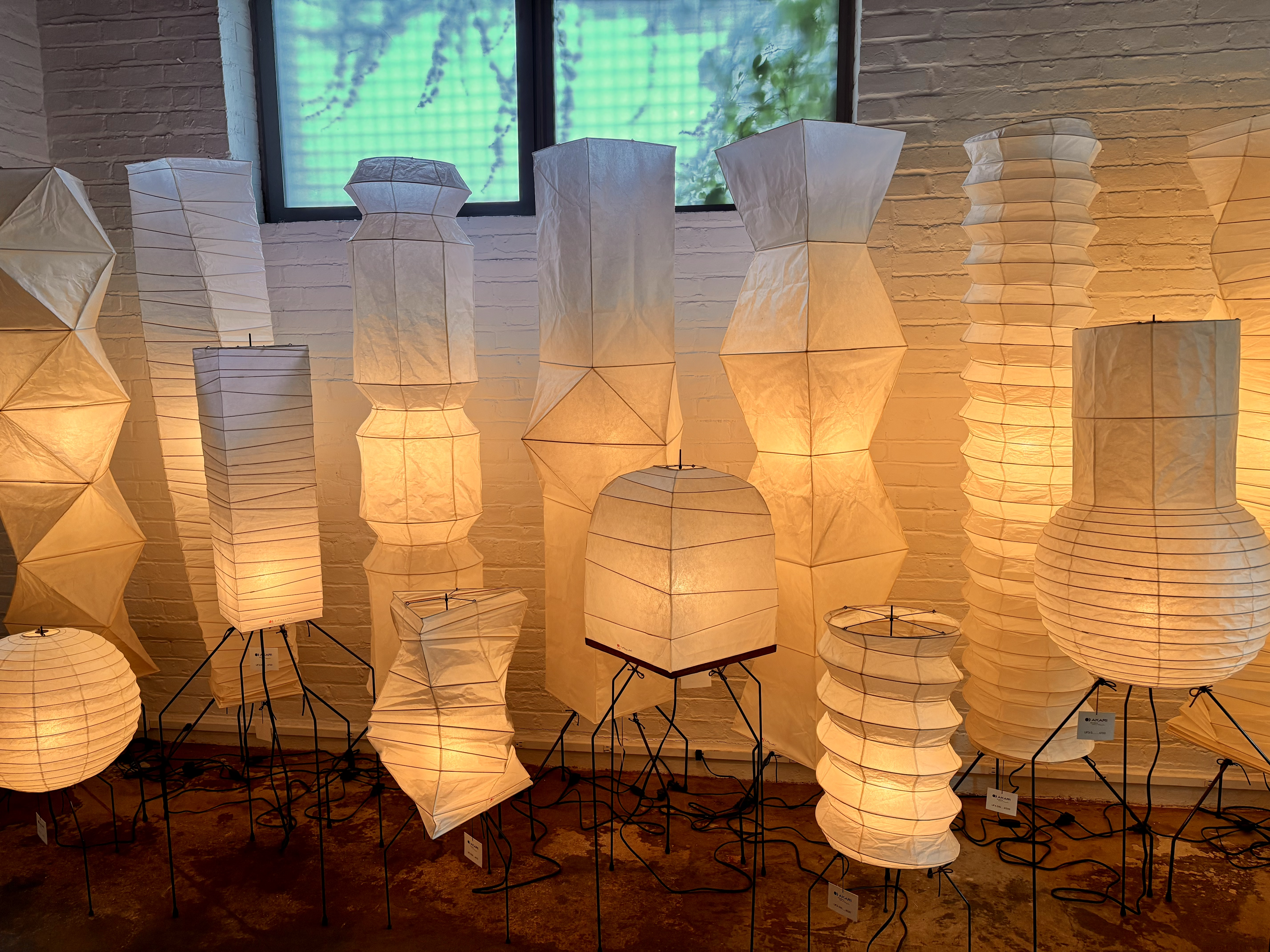
Mino washi Akari light sculptures by Isamu Noguchi (1950s)

The Japanese art of making paper from the mulberry plant called washi (和紙) is thought to have begun in the 6th century. Dyeing paper with a wide variety of hues and decorating it with designs became a major preoccupation of the Heian court, and the enjoyment of beautiful paper and its use has continued thereafter, with some modern adaptations. The traditionally made paper called izumo (after the shrine area where it is made) was especially desired for fusuma (sliding panels) decoration, artists' papers, and elegant letter paper. Some printmakers have their own logo made into their papers, and since the Meiji period, another special application has been Western marbleized endpapers (made by the Atelier Miura in Tokyo).

== Other crafts ==
=== Glass ===
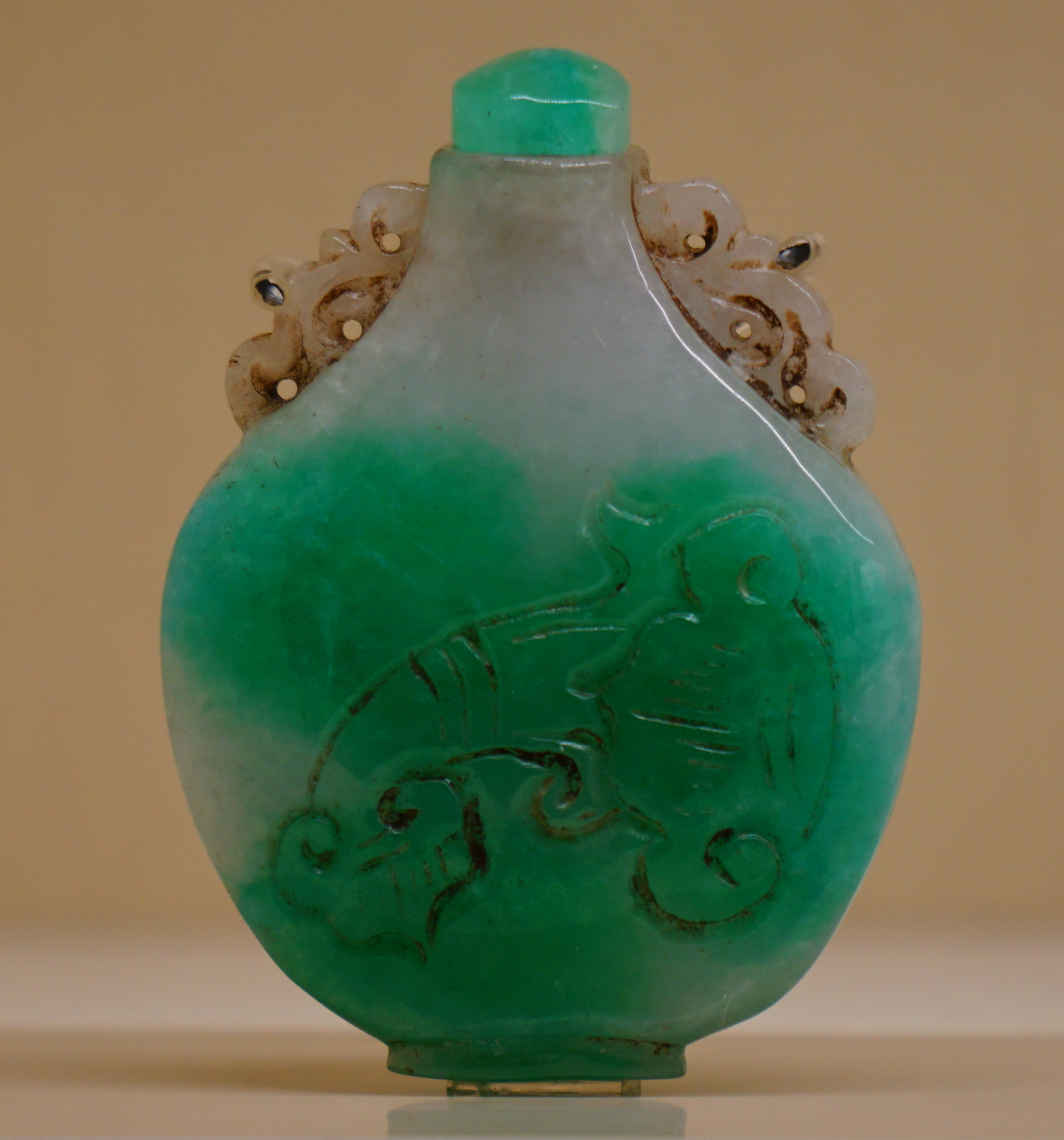
Imitation jade snuff bottle in glass, Museum of Oriental Ceramics, Osaka

The tradition of glass production goes back as far as the Kofun period in Japan, but was used very rarely and more for decorative purposes, such as decorating some kanzashi. Only relatively late in the Edo period did it experience increased popularity, and with the beginning of modernisation during the Meiji era large-scale industrial production of glassware commenced.

Despite the advent of wider industrial production, glassware continues to exist as a craft – for example, in traditions such as Edo kiriko (江戸切子) and Satsuma kiriko (薩摩切子). The various techniques used are:

- Glassblowing (吹きガラス)
- Cut glass (切子)
- Gravure (グラヴィール)
- Pâte de verre (パート・ド・ヴェール)
- Enameling (エナメル絵付け)

=== Cloisonné ===
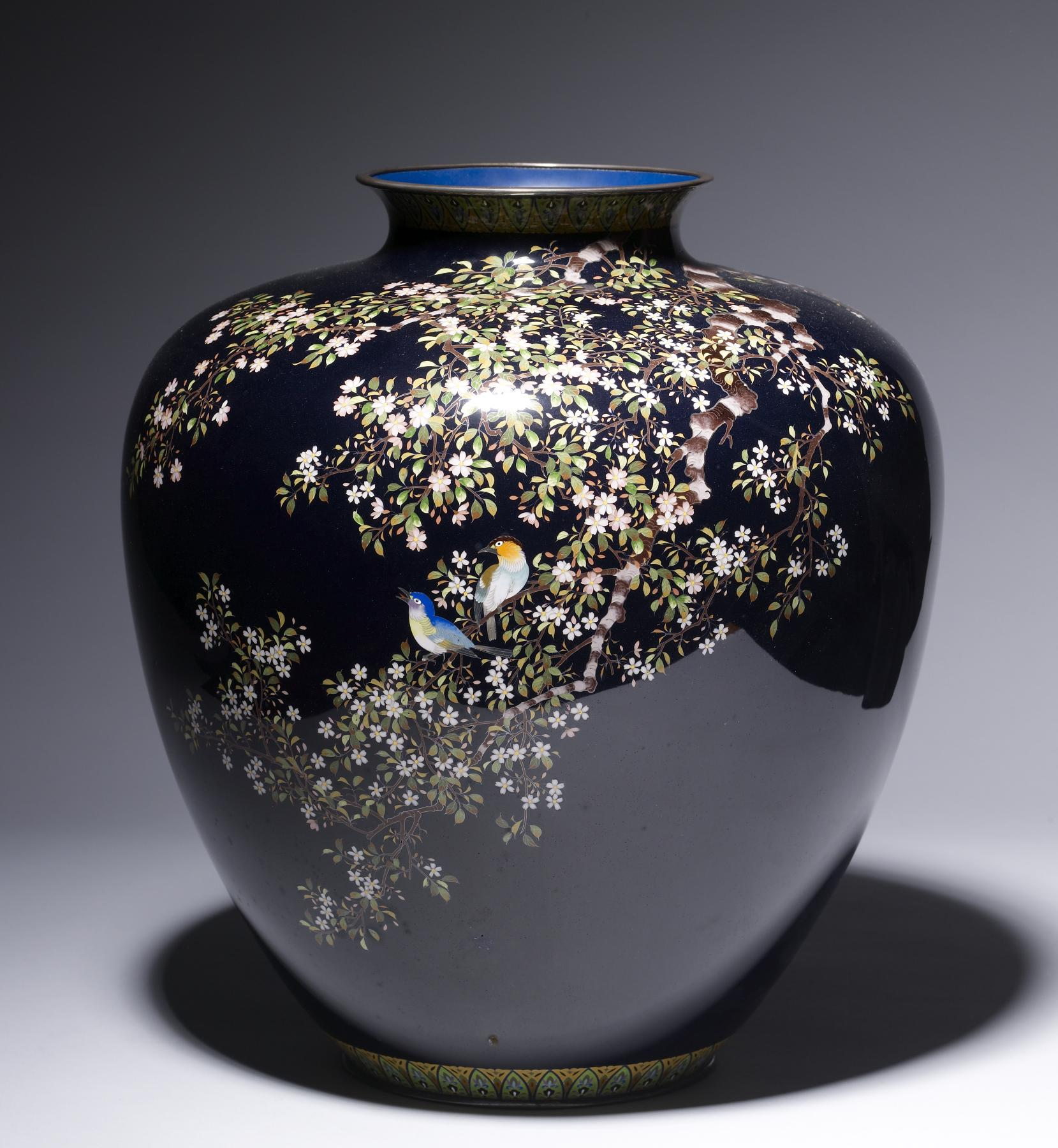
Vase with Flowering Cherry and Birds by Ando Cloisonné (c. 1910)

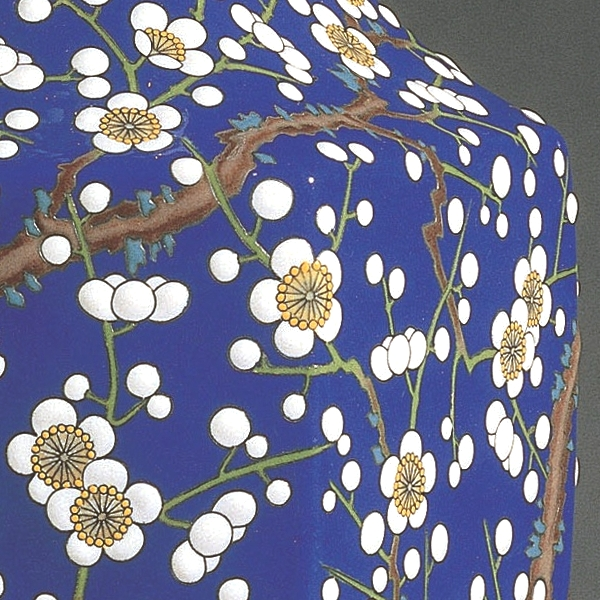
Japanese cloisonne type moriage shippo

Cloisonné (截金, shippō) is a glass-like glaze that is applied to a metal framework, and then fired in a kiln. It developed especially in Owari province around Nagoya in the late Edo period and going into the Meiji era. One of the leading traditional producing companies that still exists is the Ando Cloisonné Company.

Techniques of shippō include:

- Yusen-shippō (有線七宝)
- Shotai-shippō (省胎七宝)
- Doro-shippō (泥七宝)

=== Gem carving ===
Gem carving (砡, gyoku) is carving naturally patterned agate or various hard crystals into tea bowls and incense containers.

=== Decorative gilt or silver leaf ===
Kirikane (截金) is a decorative technique used for paintings and Buddhist statues, which applies gold leaf, silver leaf, platinum leaf cut into geometric patterns of lines, diamonds and triangles.

=== Inkstone carving ===
Calligraphy is considered one of the classical refinements and art forms of Japan. The production of inkstones was therefore greatly valued.

=== Ivory carving ===
Bachiru (撥鏤) is the art of engraving and dyeing ivory.

== See also ==
- Intangible Cultural Properties of Japan
- Meibutsu
- Mingei
- List of Traditional Crafts of Japan
