= 50 Norman =

Japanese shopping hub in Greenpoint

- Interactive map of the 50 Norman area

General information
- Location: 50 Norman Avenue, Brooklyn, New York, United States
- Coordinates: 40.7247°N 73.9536°W
- Opened: September 16, 2022

Design and construction
- Architect: Schemata Architects

50 Norman is a Japanese market and eatery in Greenpoint, Brooklyn. Featuring retail spaces for home design, kitchenware, and others, as well as fusion restaurants, it was designed by Jo Nagasaka at Schemata Architects and marked one of the firm's first works in the United States.

== History ==
On September 16, 2022, 50 Norman opened with three stores: Dashi Okume, a dashi store; Cibone, a home design store; and House Brooklyn, an omakase restaurant. The building was formerly occupied by a car repair shop and remodeled with "reclaimed woods from a demolished old house in Kyoto."

In April 2025, 50 Norman expanded into an adjacent space and added Balmuda, a home appliance store, and Kama-asa, a kitchenware store. In June, House Brooklyn opened a new French-Japanese fusion café and wine bar called Cafe O'te in the space.

== Stores ==
- Cibone, home design
- Dashi Okume, dashi
- House Brooklyn, Japanese-French restaurant
- Cafe O'te, Japanese-French café and wine bar
- Balmuda, home appliances
- Kama-asa, kitchenware
