= Kotabe Foundry =

Casting company

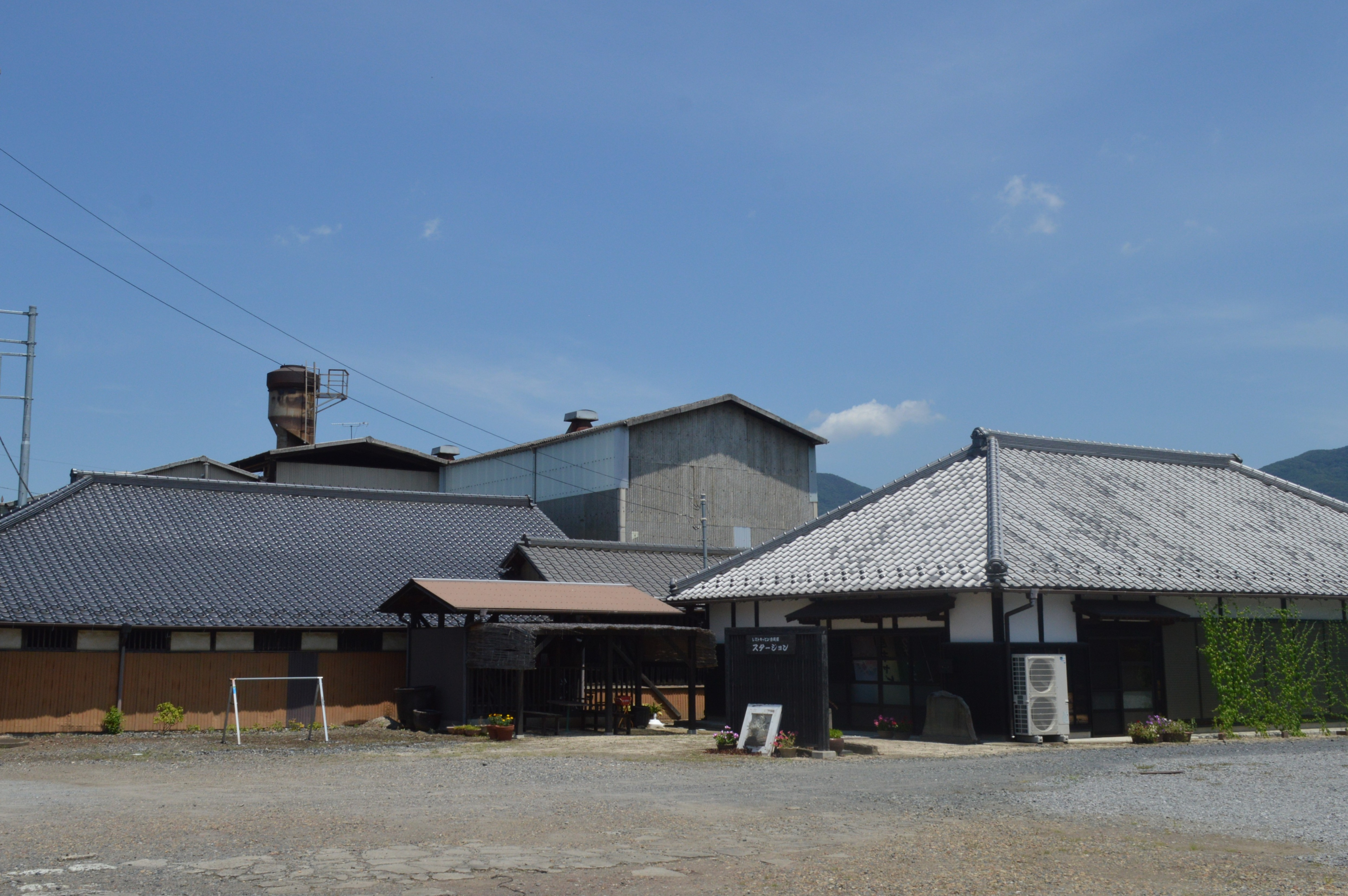
- Industry: Foundry (Bellfounding)
- Founded: 1190 - 1199
- Headquarters: Sakuragawa, Ibaraki Prefecture, Japan
- Website: www.kotabe-chuzo.co.jp

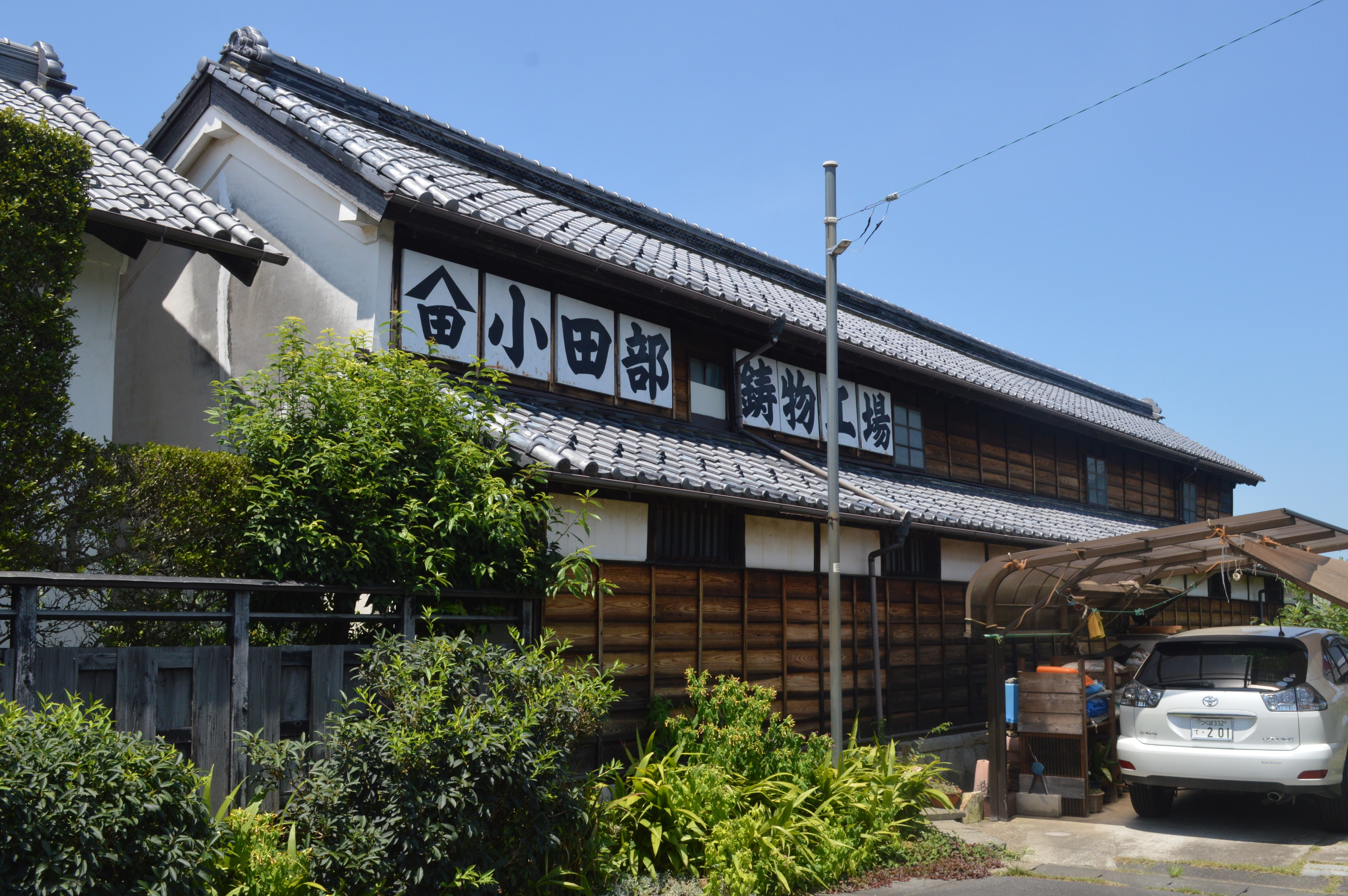
Storehouse

Kotabe Foundry (小田部鋳造, Kotabe Chuzo) is a casting company in Sakuragawa, Ibaraki Prefecture, Japan.

== History ==
The company established over 800 years ago and operated by the 37th successor to the family business. It is located in Sakuragawa at the foot of the famous Mount Tsukuba, where sands and clay for the molds are found.

== Products ==
- Temple bells
- Rainwater bowls (Tensuioke)

etc.

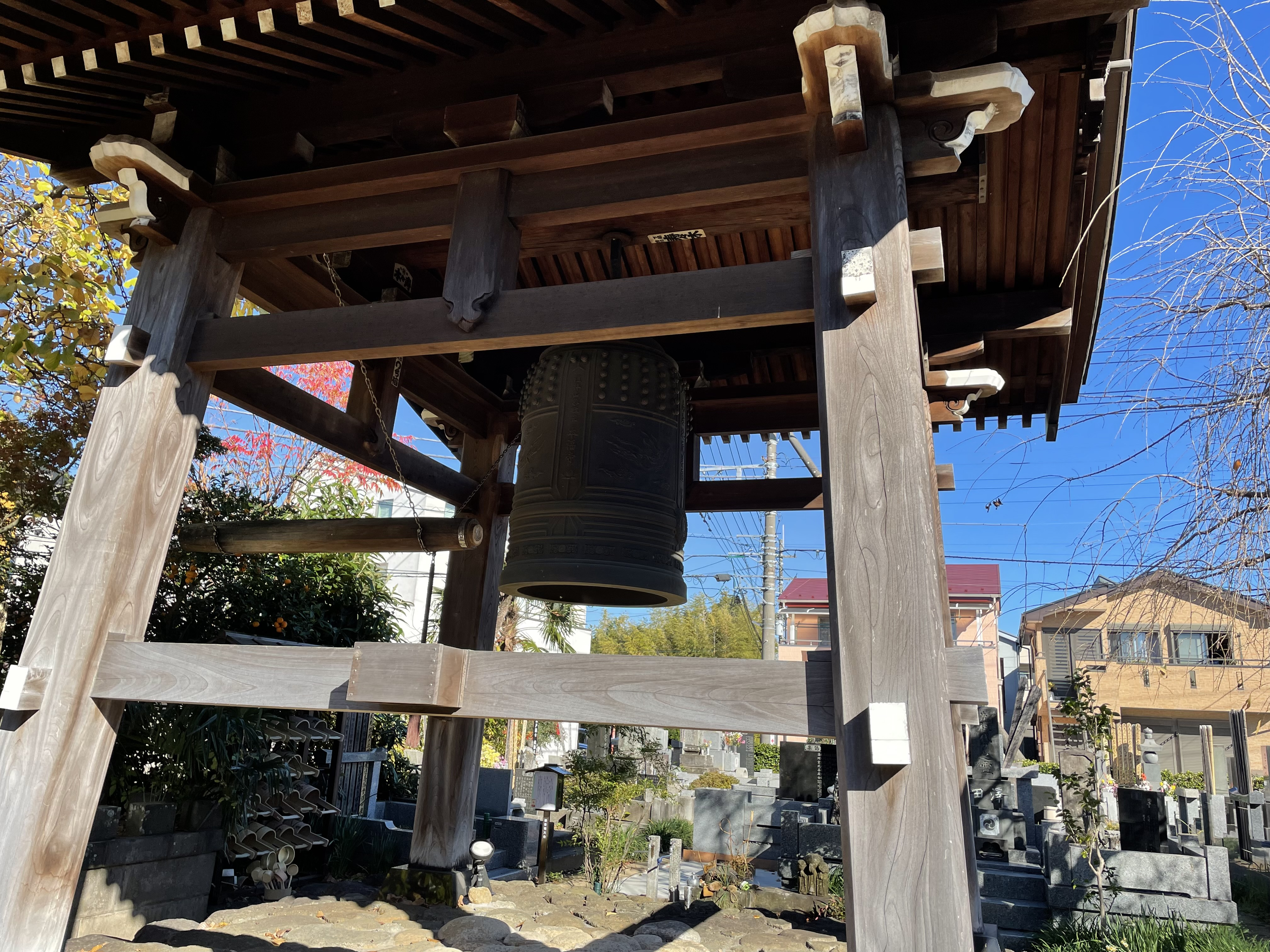
Temple bell (Honpuku-ji)

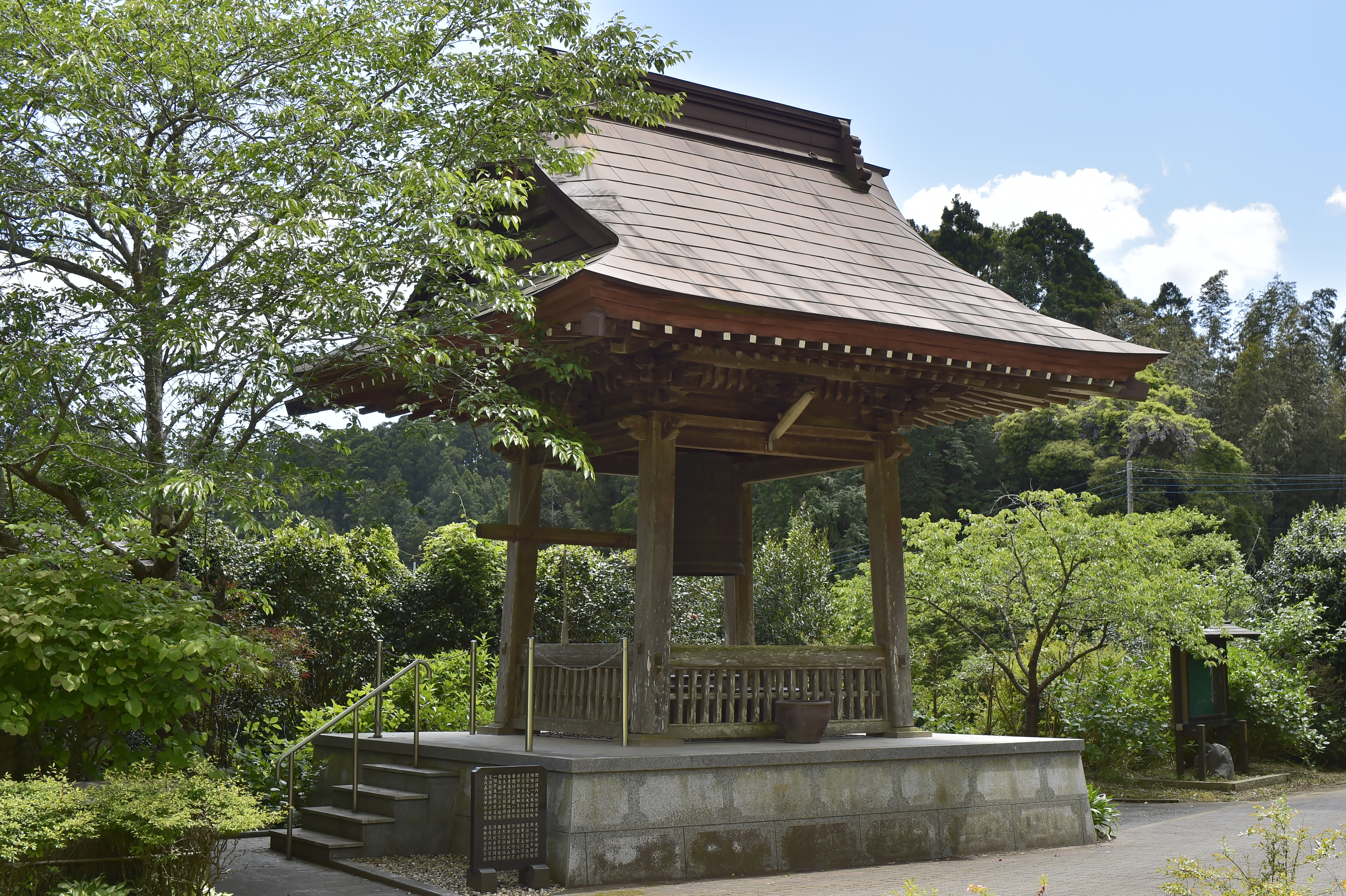
Temple bell (Myoko-ji)

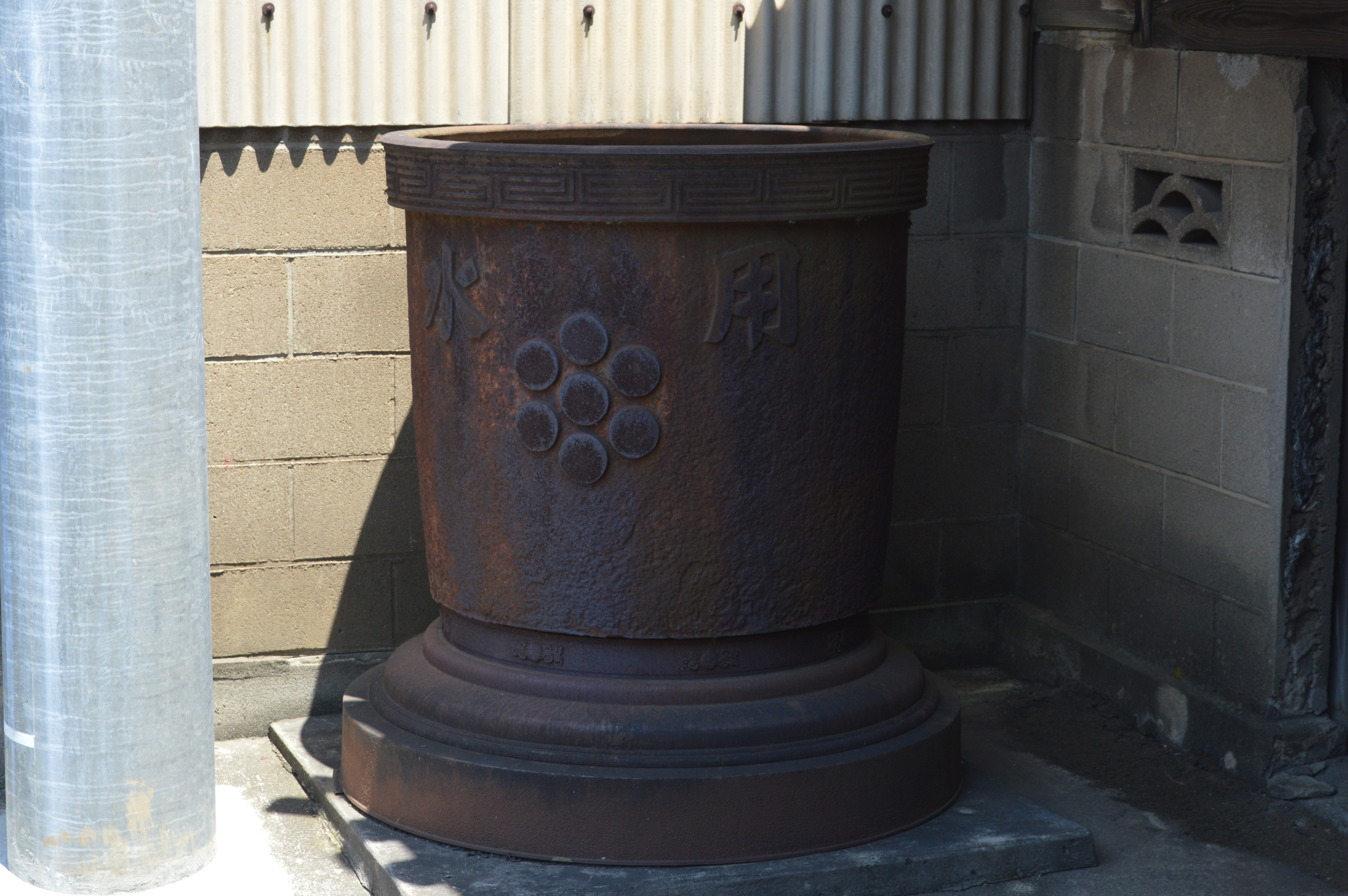
Rainwater bowls

== See also ==
- Early Japanese iron-working techniques
- List of oldest companies
