= House Brooklyn =

Restaurant in Greenpoint

- Interactive map of the House Brooklyn area

General information
- Location: 50 Norman Avenue, Brooklyn, New York, United States
- Coordinates: 40.7247°N 73.9536°W
- Opened: May 2023

Design and construction
- Architect: Schemata Architects

House Brooklyn is a French-Japanese fusion restaurant in Greenpoint, Brooklyn. Housed inside the 50 Norman building, it provides omakase for eight guests at a time, in two seatings a day, from a menu set by chef Yuji Tani.

== History ==
Prior to his culinary career, Tani, a native of Kyoto, worked sales for a futon company. He then worked in French restaurants in Kyoto and Tokyo. Afterward, he opened his own restaurant, House, in the latter city, "in a black-glass cube in the Nishi-Azabu neighborhood," in 2007.

In May 2023, Tani opened a second location, House Brooklyn, in Greenpoint. Originally, House Brooklyn was scheduled to open in 2020, but the COVID-19 pandemic stalled Tani's plans after he had moved to the United States in 2019. His goal was to "open [a restaurant] outside of Japan, and cook somewhere that is more diverse and multicultural."

== Critical reception ==
Pete Wells, for The New York Times, gave House Brooklyn two out of four stars, labeling it a Critic's Pick.
