= Cafe O'te =

Restaurant in Greenpoint

- Interactive map of Cafe O'te

General information
- Location: 50 Norman Avenue, Brooklyn, New York, United States
- Coordinates: 40.7247°N 73.9536°W
- Opened: July 2025

Design and construction
- Architect: Schemata Architects

Cafe O'te is a Japanese-French fusion wine bar and café in Greenpoint, Brooklyn. Located inside of the 50 Norman building, it is known for its wagyu hamburg steaks.

== History ==
Cafe O'te opened in July 2025, along with Kama-asa and Balmuda, as part of 50 Norman's expansion. Its food and bar menu was set by Yuji Tani, the chef of House Brooklyn, also housed inside of 50 Norman.

== Critical reception ==
The Infatuation gave Cafe O'te a 7.8 out of 10, recommending both its signature wagyu hamburg steak as well as its Japanese custard pudding.

The Observer called it one of New York City's most exciting restaurant openings for July 2025.

Nabi Magazine called its Japanese custard pudding the best in the city.
