= Neko chigura =

Kind of cat house made of straw in Japan

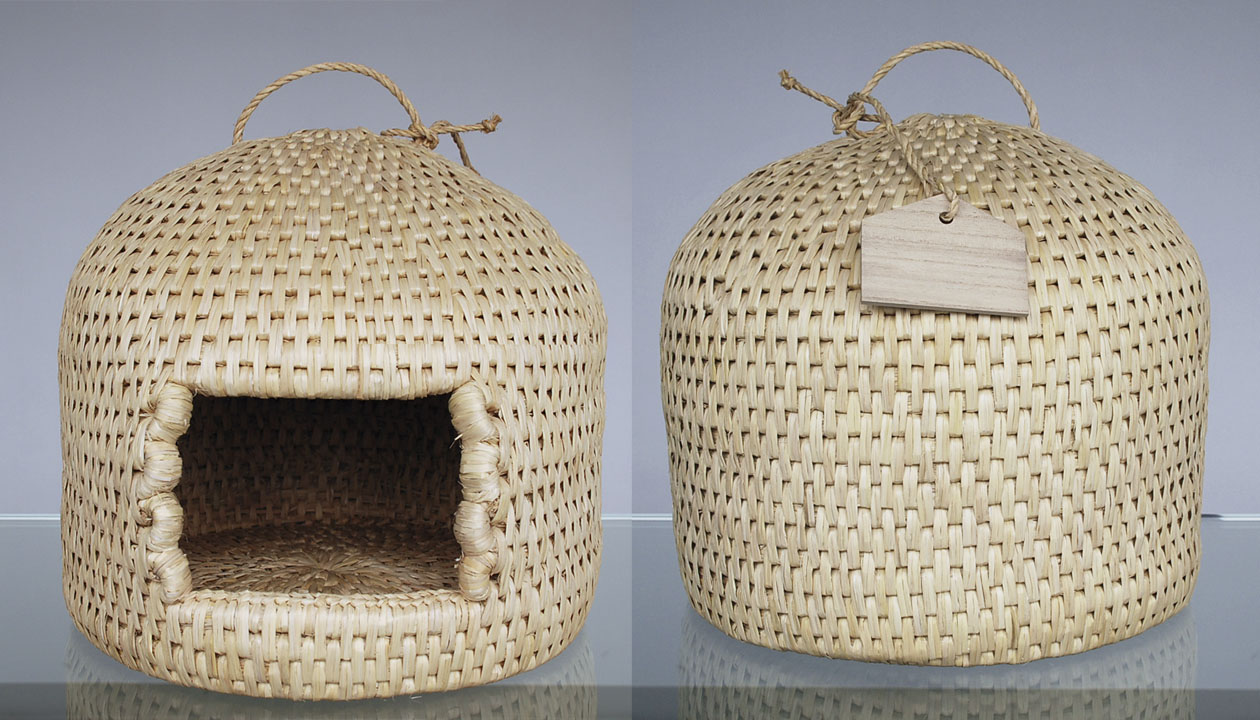
A neko tsugura

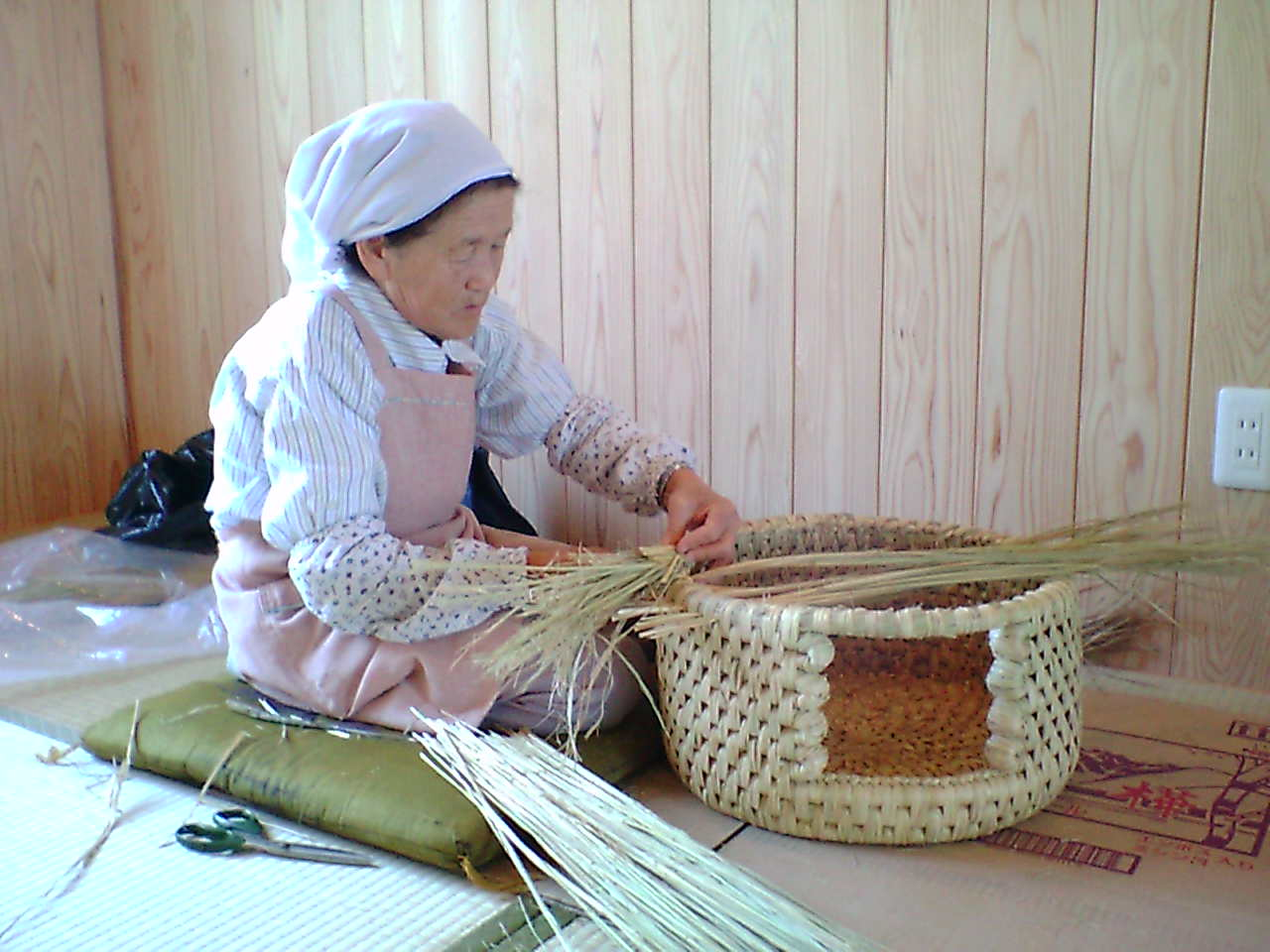
A neko chigura production demonstration in Michinoeki, Sekikawa

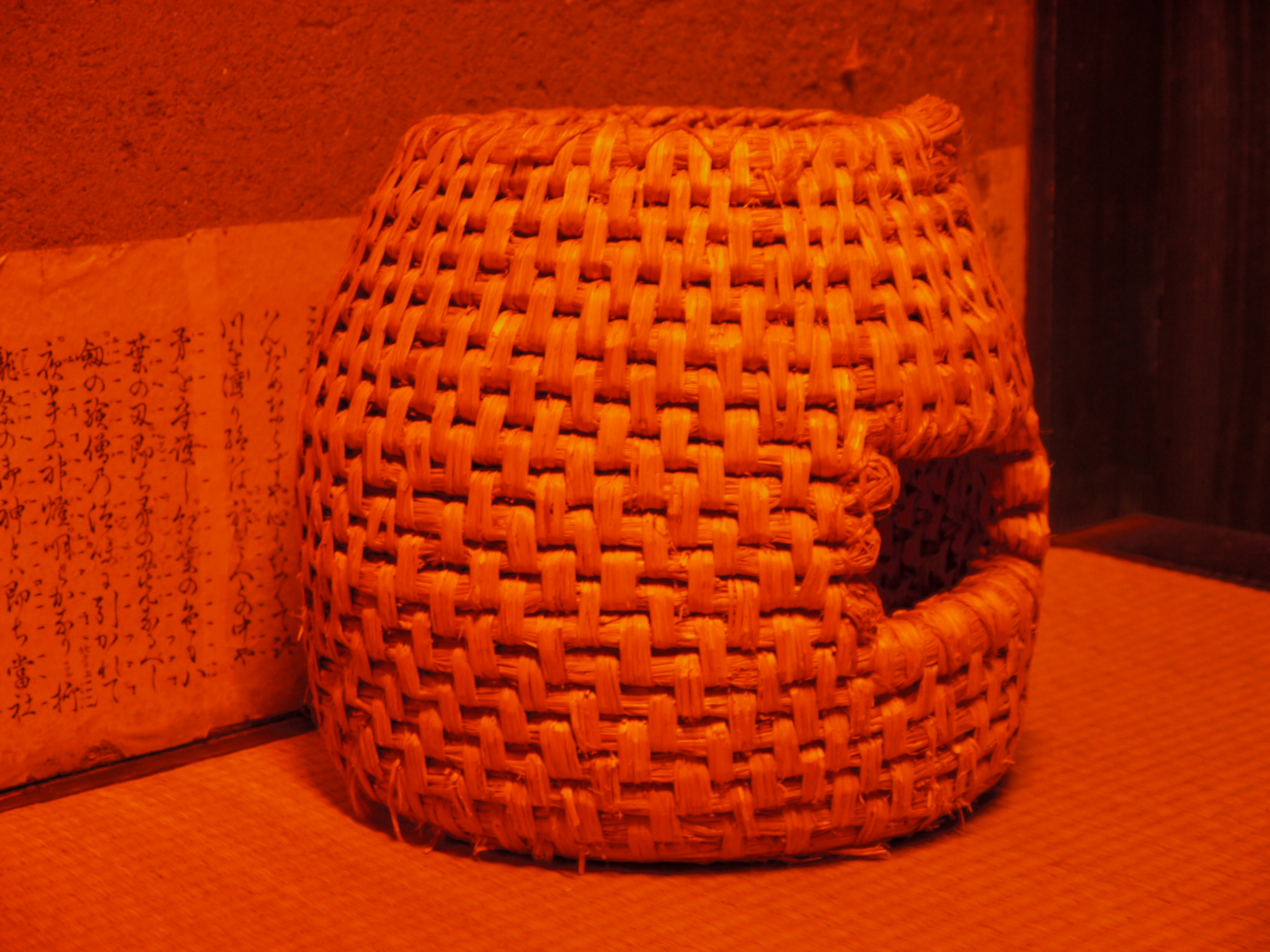
A neko chigura from the Edo period

A neko chigura (Japanese: 猫(ねこ)ちぐら), or neko tsugura (猫つぐら), is a kind of cat house made of straw in Japan. It is a folk craft of Sekikawa-mura, Niigata-ken, or Akiyamago (the area of Tsunan-machi, Niigata-ken and Sakae-mura, Nagano-ken). It is called nekochigura in Sekikawa, and nekotsugura in Akiyamago (ja).

Chigura or tsugura is written as "稚座" in kanji, and means bassinet in the Niigata dialect, where there is the custom to use rice straw baskets for babies. Niigata constitutes, in fact, a rice granary and the basket industry is a side business in the winter season when the prefecture becomes snowbound.

Presently, chigura for cats vary in shape according to the originality of the producer. There are two common types: pillbox and pot-shaped. There are also some basket types. As cats seem to prefer small enclosed spaces, they like neko chigura to sleep in.

== See also ==
- Cat café#Japan
- Culture of Japan
- Japanese handicrafts
