= Dashi Okume =

Japanese broth store in Greenpoint

- Interactive map of the Dashi Okume area

General information
- Location: 50 Norman Avenue, Brooklyn, New York, United States
- Coordinates: 40.7247°N 73.9536°W
- Opened: September 16, 2022

Design and construction
- Architect: Schemata Architects

Dashi Okume is a Japanese broth store in Greenpoint, Brooklyn. Housed inside the 50 Norman building, it sells over 30 kinds of Japanese ingredients that customers can select from in order to make a custom dashi pack. It is considered "the first Japanese natural broth shop" in the United States.

== History ==
In 2022, Japanese market and eatery 50 Norman opened in Greenpoint, providing Japanese retail and dining experiences to an American audience. Among its first three storefronts was Dashi Okume, which had been conceptualized as an American counterpart to Okume Shoten, a dried goods retailer founded in the Tsukiji fish market over 150 years before.

In 2024, Dashi Okume hosted a seven-course omakase, consisting of oden, through every weekend in March. In April, they hosted a pop-up in collaboration with Noma Projects, selling the latter's products in its 50 Norman space for a few days. Later, in May, they did a weekend omakase series for udon.
