= Early Japanese iron-working techniques =

Early Japanese iron-working techniques are known primarily from archaeological evidence dating to the Asuka period (538–710 CE). Iron was first brought to Japan during the earlier Yayoi period (900 BCE to 248 CE). Iron artifacts of the period include farm implements, arrowheads, and rarely a knife blade. An ironworking industry likely evolved during the late Yayoi or the Kofun period, when iron weapons and armor became more common. However, the best archaeological evidence for early iron-working techniques in Japan dates to the Asuka period, after Buddhism had been introduced to the imperial court of the Yamato state.

== Japanese bloomeries ==
The traditional Japanese furnace, known as a tatara, was a hybrid type of furnace. It incorporated bellows, like the European blast furnace, but was constructed of clay; these furnaces would be destroyed after the first use. According to existing archeological records, the first tataras were built during the middle part of the sixth century A.D. Due to the large scale of the tatara, as compared to its European, Indian and Chinese counterparts, the temperature at a given point would vary based on the height in the furnace. Therefore, different types of iron could be found at different heights inside the furnace, ranging from wrought iron at the top of the tatara (furthest from the heat, lowest temperature), to cast iron towards the middle, and finally steel towards the bottom (with varying degrees of carbon content.) Importantly, tataras did not exceed 1500 C, so they did not completely melt the iron.

The metal-workers clearly had an understanding of the differences between the various types of iron found in the tatara, and they separated out and selected different portions of the “bloom” accordingly. In katana forging, for example, only the high- and low- carbon blooms were selected for use. The swordsmiths would then forge the two types of blooms into larger sheets, pound the sheets, fold them on themselves, then repeat this process a minimum of 10 times. Although the chemical process was unknown to them, they were effectively distributing the carbon content of the steel evenly throughout the product, and also distributing the impurities more evenly. This resulted in a product of excellent strength, which had a carbon content higher than that of contemporary European works, but not as high as those found in Indian artifacts.

== Transfer of Technology ==
The tatara bloomery method is considered by historians and archeologists to be unique, and more specifically “an exotic outlier of mainstream metallurgical development.” It has been suggested by scholars that this technology was initially imported from Korea, but the evidence for this is not overwhelming. We can, however, conclude that the Japanese bloomery with its linear design, (in contrast to circular European blast furnaces) certainly resembles many contemporary South Asian designs. The etymology of “tatara” is not Japanese in its origin, which supports the theory that this technology was not locally synthesized.

However, after its adoption, this technology was indeed adapted for local use. While the tatara has commonalities with other South Asian furnace designs, including those of Sri Lanka and Cambodia, the local materials for use in the blast furnace were very different. The main source of ores for Japanese steel was iron sand, a sand-like substance which accumulated as an end product of the erosion of granite and andesite in mountainous regions of Japan. Importantly, it was less labor-intensive to extract the ore from the sand than from hard rock. Furthermore, this sand could be obtained by surface mining, rather than more laborious mining process. However, these sands had a much lower percentage of iron than that typically found in rock-ores, only 2-5% ferrous oxide compared to 79-87% ferrous oxide in certain Sri Lankan ores. Since this smaller percentage of iron would inevitably lead to smaller blooms, Japanese metal workers would have been very familiar with the process of combining blooms. Given these environmental constraints, the most effective solution was to combine certain types of blooms, and through trial-and-error, early sword smiths were able to determine that the most effective combinations of blooms (for swords) were those at the bottom of the tatara.

== See also ==
* Tatara (furnace)
