= Jo Nagasaka =

Japanese architect

- Education: Tokyo University of the Arts
- Occupation: Architect
- Years active: 1998–present
- Employer(s): Schemata Architects, HAPPA

Jo Nagasaka is a Japanese architect. He is the founder of Schemata Architects, a Tokyo-based design studio working in architecture, interior design, and industrial design.

== Education ==
Nagasaka graduated from Tokyo University of the Arts in 1998.

== Career ==
Right after graduating from college, Nagasaka founded Schemata Architects. There, he practices "Half-Architecture," an approach which views architecture not as an isolated, insular entity but rather a "heteronomous" one, "adapting to its environment and activities."

In 2007, Nagasaka founded HAPPA, a creative studio.

In 2016, Nagasaka released his own monograph of work, Jo Nagasaka: On My Mind, which shows many of Schemata Architects' buildings.

In 2021, Nagasaka participated in designing the Japan Pavilion for the 2021 Venice Architecture Biennale, where he helped recycle the materials of an old Japanese house for its construction.
