= List of living national treasures of Japan (crafts) =

This list of living national treasures of Japan (crafts) contains all the individuals and groups certified as living national treasures by the Ministry of Education, Culture, Sports, Science and Technology of the government of Japan in the category of the Japanese crafts (工芸技術, Kōgei Gijutsu).

Crafts are divided into eight categories: pottery, textiles, lacquerware, metalworking, dollmaking, woodworking, papermaking, and other. The categories are subdivided into a number of more specific subcategories.

Those working in crafts are eligible for recognition either individually (individual certification) or as part of a group (preservation group certification).

== List of current designated individuals (crafts) ==
=== Ceramics ===
Name	Born	Category	Subcategory	Year designated
Kiyoshi Hara (原清)	1936	Pottery	Tetsugusuri	2005
Osamu Suzuki (鈴木藏)	1934	Pottery	Shino-yaki	1994
Jun Isezaki (伊勢崎淳)	1936	Pottery	Bizen-yaki	2004
Manji Inoue (井上萬二)	1929	Pottery	Hakuji	1995
Akihiro Maeta (前田昭博)	1954	Pottery	Hakuji	2013
Hiroshi Nakashima (中島宏)	1941	Pottery	Seiji	2007
Minori Yoshita (吉田美統)	1932	Pottery	Yūri-kinsai	2001
Sekisui Itō V (五代伊藤赤水)	1941	Pottery	Mumyōi-yaki	2003
Kōzō Katō (加藤幸造)	1935	Pottery	Setoguro	2010

=== Textiles ===
Name	Born	Category	Subcategory	Year designated
Yasutaka Komiya (小宮康孝)	1925	Textiles	Edo Komon	1978
Hiroshi Tajima (田島比呂子)	1922	Textiles	Yuzen	2000
Kunihiko Moriguchi (森口邦彦)	1941	Textiles	Yuzen	2007
Osao Futatsuka (二塚長生)	1946	Textiles	Yuzen	2010
Takeshi Kitamura (北村武資)	1935	Textiles	Ra	2000
Yoshio Kouda (甲田綏郎)	1929	Textiles	Seigō Sendaihira	2002
Hyōji Kitagawa (喜多川俵二)	1936	Textiles	Yūsoku Orimono	1999
Kisaburō Ogawa (小川規三郎)	1936	Textiles	Kenjō Hakata-ori	2003
Fukumi Shimura (志村ふくみ)	1924	Textiles	Tsumugi-ori	1990
Sonoko Sasaki (佐々木苑子)	1939	Textiles	Tsumugi-ori	2005
Fumi Koga (古賀フミ)	1927	Textiles	Saga Nishiki	1994
Yūkō Tamanaha (玉那覇有公)	1936	Textiles	Bingata	1996
Kijū Fukuda (福田喜重)	1932	Textiles	Shishū	1997
Hatsuko Miyahira (宮平初子)	1922	Textiles	Shuri no Orimono	1998
Takeshi Kitamura (北村武資)	1935	Textiles	Tate Nishiki	2000
Shigeto Suzuta (鈴田滋人)	1954	Textiles	Mokuhan Zurisarasa	2008
Yoshinori Tsuchiya (土屋順紀)	1954	Textiles	Monsha	2010
Sachiko Arakaki (新垣幸子)	1946	Textiles	Yaeyama Joufu	2024

=== Lacquerware ===
Name	Born	Category	Subcategory	Year designated
Kazumi Murose (室瀬和美)	1950	Lacquerware	Maki-e	2008
Kōichi Nakano (中野孝一)	1947	Lacquerware	Maki-e	2010
Fumio Mae (前史雄)	1940	Lacquerware	Chinkin	1999
Masami Isoi (磯井正美)	1926	Lacquerware	Kinma	1985
Hitoshi Ōta (太田儔)	1931	Lacquerware	Kinma	1994
Yoshito Yamashita (山下義人)	1951	Lacquerware	Kinma	2013
Isao Ōnishi (大西勲)	1944	Lacquerware	Kyūshitsu	2002
Kunie Komori (小森邦衞)	1945	Lacquerware	Kyūshitsu	2006
Kiichirō Masumura (増村紀一郎)	1941	Lacquerware	Kyūshitsu	2008
Shōsai Kitamura (北村昭斎)	1938	Lacquerware	Raden	1999

=== Metalworking ===
Name	Born	Category	Subcategory	Year designated
Yukie Ōsumi (大角幸枝)	1945	Metalworking	Tankin	2015
Iraku Uozumi III (三代魚住為楽)	1937	Metalworking	Dora	2002
Mamoru Nakagawa (中川衛)	1947	Metalworking	Chōkin	2004
Morihito Katsura (桂盛仁)	1944	Metalworking	Chōkin	2008
Akira Saitō (斎藤明)	1920	Metalworking	Chūkin	1993
Kōmin Ōzawa (大澤光民)	1941	Metalworking	Chūkin	2005
Hōseki Okuyama (奥山峰石)	1937	Metalworking	Hammering	1995
Toshichika Taguchi (田口寿恒)	1940	Metalworking	Hammering	2006
Norio Tamagawa (玉川宣夫)	1942	Metalworking	Hammering	2010

=== Dollmaking ===
Name	Born	Category	Subcategory	Year designated
Nobuko Akiyama (秋山信子)	1928	Dollmaking	Ishō Ningyō	1996
Komao Hayashi (林駒夫)	1936	Dollmaking	Tōsa	2002

=== Woodworking ===
Name	Born	Category	Subcategory	Year designated
Sōhō Katsushiro (勝城蒼鳳)	1934	Woodworking	Bamboo	2005
Noboru Fujinuma (藤沼昇)	1945	Woodworking	Bamboo	2012
Ryōzō Kawagita (川北良造)	1934	Woodworking	Wood	1994
Hiromichi Ōsaka (大坂弘道)	1937	Woodworking	Wood	1997
Kiyotsugu Nakagawa (中川清司)	1942	Woodworking	Wood	2001
Akira Murayama (村山明)	1944	Woodworking	Wood	2003
Tatsuo Haisoto (灰外達夫)	1941	Woodworking	Wood	2012

=== Papermaking ===
Name	Born	Category	Subcategory	Year designated
Ichibee Iwano IX (九代岩野市兵衛)	1933	Papermaking	Echizen Hōsho	2000
Sajio Hamada (浜田幸雄)	1931	Papermaking	Tosa Tengujō-shi	2001
Takenobu Tanino (谷野剛惟)	1935	Papermaking	Najioganbi-shi	2002

== List of past designated individuals (crafts) ==
=== Ceramics ===
Name	Born	Died	Category	Subcategory	Year designated
Kenkichi Tomimoto (富本憲吉)	1886	1963	Pottery	Iroe	1955
Hajime Katō (加藤土師萌)	1900	1968	Pottery	Iroe	1961
Yoshimichi Fujimoto (藤本能道)	1919	1992	Pottery	Iroe	1986
Imaemon Imaizumi XIII (今泉今右衛門（13代）)	1926	2001	Pottery	Iroe	1989
Kakiemon Sakaida XIV (酒井田柿右衛門（14代）)	1934	2013	Pottery	Iroe	2001
Munemaro Ishiguro (石黒宗麿)	1893	1968	Pottery	Tetsugusuri	1955
Uichi Shimizu (清水卯一)	1926	2004	Pottery	Tetsugusuri	1985
Shōji Hamada (浜田庄司)	1894	1978	Pottery	Mashiko-yaki	1955
Toyozō Arakawa (荒川豊蔵)	1894	1985	Pottery	Shino-yaki	1955
Kyūwa Miwa (三輪休和)	1896	1981	Pottery	Hagi-yaki	1970
Jusetsu Miwa (三輪壽雪)	1910	2012	Pottery	Hagi-yaki	1983
Tōyō Kaneshige (金重陶陽)	1896	1967	Pottery	Bizen-yaki	1956
Kei Fujiwara (藤原啓)	1899	1983	Pottery	Bizen-yaki	1970
Tōshū Yamamoto (山本陶秀)	1906	1994	Pottery	Bizen-yaki	1987
Yū Fujiwara (藤原雄)	1932	2001	Pottery	Bizen-yaki	1996
Muan Nakazato (中里無庵)	1895	1985	Pottery	Karatsu-yaki	1976
Yūzō Kondo (近藤悠三)	1902	1985	Pottery	Sometsuke	1985
Kaiji Tsukamoto (塚本快示)	1912	1990	Pottery	Seihakuji	1983
Jirō Kinjō (金城次郎)	1912	2004	Pottery	Ryukyuan Pottery	1985
Kōichi Tamura (田村耕一)	1918	1987	Pottery	Tetsue	1986
Kōsei Matsui (松井康成)	1927	2003	Pottery	Neriage	1993
Takuo Katō (加藤卓男)	1917	2005	Pottery	Sansai	1995
Tatsuzō Shimaoka (島岡達三)	1919	2007	Pottery	Folk Pottery (Jōmon)	1996
Koheiji Miura (三浦小平二)	1933	2006	Pottery	Seiji	1997
Jōzan Yamada III (三代山田常山)	1924	2005	Pottery	Tokoname-yaki	1998
Tokuda Yasokichi III (三代徳田八十)	1933	2009	Pottery	Saiyū	1997
Fukushima Zenzo (福島善三)	1959		Pottery	Koishiwara-yaki	2017

=== Textiles ===
Name	Born	Died	Category	Subcategory	Year designated
Kōsuke Komiya (小宮康助)	1882	1961	Textiles	Edo Komon	1955
Sadakichi Matsubara (松原定吉)	1893	1955	Textiles	Nagaita Chūgata	1955
Kōtarō Shimizu (清水幸太郎)	1897	1988	Textiles	Nagaita Chūgata	1955
Kihachi Tabata III (田畑喜八)	1877	1956	Textiles	Yuzen	1955
Uzan Kimura (木村雨山)	1891	1977	Textiles	Yuzen	1955
Katsuma Nakamura (中村勝馬)	1894	1982	Textiles	Yuzen	1955
Tameji Ueno (上野為二)	1901	1960	Textiles	Yuzen	1955
Kakō Moriguchi (森口華弘)	1909	2008	Textiles	Yuzen	1967
Mitsugi Yamada (山田貢)	1912	2002	Textiles	Yuzen	1984
Tokio Hata (羽田登喜男)	1911	2008	Textiles	Yuzen	1988
Eiichi Yamada (山田栄一)	1900	1956	Textiles	Yuzen Yōjinori	1955
Ayano Chiba (千葉あやの)	1889	1980	Textiles	Shōaizome	1955
Keisuke Serizawa (芹沢銈介)	1895	1984	Textiles	Kataezome	1956
Toshijirō Inagaki (稲垣稔次郎)	1902	1963	Textiles	Kataezome	1962
Yoshitarō Kamakura (鎌倉芳太郎)	1898	1983	Textiles	Kataezome	1973
Heirō Kitagawa (喜多川平朗)	1898	1988	Textiles	Ra	1960
Eisuke Kōda (甲田栄佑)	1902	1970	Textiles	Seigō Sendaihira	1956
Jūsuke Fukami (深見重助)	1885	1974	Textiles	Karakumi	1956
Heirō Kitagawa (喜多川平朗)	1898	1988	Textiles	Yūsoku Orimono	1960
Zensaburō Ogawa (小川善三郎)	1900	1983	Textiles	Kenjō Hakata-ori	
Rikizō Munehiro (宗広力三)	1914	1989	Textiles	Tsumugishima-ori (Kasuri-ori)	1983
Kagaku Hosomi (細見華岳)	1922	2012	Textiles	Tsuzure-ori	1997
Sada Yonamine (与那嶺貞)	1909	2003	Textiles	Yomitanzan Hana-ori	1989
Yoshimatu Nanbu (南部芳松)	1894	1976	Textiles	Ise Paper Stencil (Tsuki-bori)	1955
Baiken Rokutani (六谷梅軒)	1907	1973	Textiles	Ise Paper Stencil (Kiri-bori)	1955
Hidekichi Nakajima (中島秀吉)	1883	1968	Textiles	Ise Paper Stencil (Dōgu-bori)	1955
Yūjirō Nakamura (中村勇二郎)	1902	1985	Textiles	Ise Paper Stencil (Dōgu-bori)	1955
Hiroshi Kodama (児玉博)	1909	1992	Textiles	Ise Paper Stencil (Shima-bori)	1955
Mie Jōnoguchi (城ノ口みゑ)	1917	2003	Textiles	Ise Paper Stencil (Ito-ire)	1955
Toshiko Taira (平良敏子)	1921	2022	Textiles	Bashōfu	1974
Shukumine Kyoko (祝嶺恭子)	1937		Textiles	Shuri-Ori	2023
Matsubara Nobuo (松原伸生)	1965		Textiles	Nagaita-Chugata	2023

=== Lacquerware ===
Name	Born	Died	Category	Subcategory	Year designated
Shōzan Takano (高野松山)	1889	1976	Lacquerware	Maki-e	1955
Gonroku Matsuda (松田権六)	1896	1986	Lacquerware	Maki-e	1955
Naoji Terai (寺井直次)	1912	1998	Lacquerware	Maki-e	1985
Yoshikuni Taguchi (田口善国)	1923	1998	Lacquerware	Maki-e	1989
Shōgyo Ōba (大場松魚)	1916	2012	Lacquerware	Maki-e	1982
Kōdō Otomaru (音丸耕堂)	1898	1997	Lacquerware	Chōshitsu	1955
Taihō Mae (前大峰)	1890	1977	Lacquerware	Chinkin	1955
Joshin Isoi (磯井如真)	1883	1964	Lacquerware	Kinma	1956
Yūsai Akaji (赤地友哉)	1906	1984	Lacquerware	Kyūshitsu	1974
Mashiki Masumura (増村益城)	1910	1996	Lacquerware	Kyūshitsu	1978
Keishirō Shioda (塩多慶四郎)	1926	2006	Lacquerware	Kyūshitsu	1995

=== Metalworking ===
Name	Born	Died	Category	Subcategory	Year designated
Iraku Uozumi III (魚住為楽)	1884	1956	Metalworking	Dora	1955
Kiyoshi Unno (海野清)	1884	1956	Metalworking	Chōkin	1955
Shirō Naitō (内藤四郎)	1907	1988	Metalworking	Chōkin	1978
Ikkoku Kashima (鹿島一谷)	1898	1996	Metalworking	Chōkin	1979
Eiichi Kanamori (金森映井智)	1908	2001	Metalworking	Chōkin	1989
Shunmei Kamoshita (鴨下春明)	1915	2001	Metalworking	Chōkin	1999
Mitsuo Masuda (増田三男)	1909	2009	Metalworking	Chōkin	1991
Shōdō Sasaki (佐々木象堂)	1882	1961	Metalworking	Rōgata Chūzō	1960
Tetsushi Nagano (長野垤志)	1900	1977	Metalworking	Cha no Yugama	1963
Ikkei Kakutani (角谷一圭)	1904	1999	Metalworking	Cha no Yugama	1984
Keiten Takahashi (高橋敬典)	1920	2009	Metalworking	Cha no Yugama	1996
Toyochika Takamura (高村豊周)	1890	1972	Metalworking	Chūkin	1964
Mitsumasa Yonemitsu (米光光正)	1888	1980	Metalworking	Bigo Zōgan	1965
Masahito Katori (香取正彦)	1899	1988	Metalworking	Bonshō	1977
Shirō Sekiya (関谷四郎)	1907	1994	Metalworking	Hammering	1977
Sadatsugu Takahashi (高橋貞次)	1902	1968	Metalworking	Swordmaking (Nihonto)	1955
Yukihira Miyairi (宮入行平)	1913	1977	Metalworking	Swordmaking (Nihonto)	1963
Sadaichi Gassan (月山貞一)	1907	1995	Metalworking	Swordmaking (Nihonto)	1971
Masamine Sumitani (隅谷正峯)	1921	1998	Metalworking	Swordmaking (Nihonto)	1981
Nisshū Honami (本阿彌日洲)	1908	1996	Metalworking	Swordmaking (Finishing)	1975
Akitsugu Amata (天田昭次)	1927	2013	Metalworking	Swordmaking (Nihonto)	1997
Kōkei Ono (小野光敬)	1913	1994	Metalworking	Swordmaking (Finishing)	1975
Matsuo Fujishiro (藤代松雄)	1914	2004	Metalworking	Swordmaking (Finishing)	1996
Kōkan Nagayama (永山光幹)	1920	2010	Metalworking	Swordmaking (Finishing)	1998
Toshihira Ōsumi (大隅俊平)	1932	2009	Metalworking	Swordmaking (Nihonto)	1997

=== Dollmaking ===
Name	Born	Died	Category	Subcategory	Year designated
Ryūjo Hori (堀柳女)	1897	1984	Dollmaking	Ishō Ningyō	1955
Gōyō Hirata (平田郷陽)	1903	1981	Dollmaking	Ishō Ningyō	1955
Sonoo Noguchi (野口園生)	1907	1996	Dollmaking	Ishō Ningyō	1986
Juzō Kagoshima (鹿児島寿蔵)	1898	1982	Dollmaking	Shiso	1961
Toshiko Ichihashi (市橋とし子)	1907	2000	Dollmaking	Tōsa	1989

=== Woodworking ===
Name	Born	Died	Category	Subcategory	Year designated
Shōunsai Shōno (生野祥雲斎)	1904	1974	Woodworking	Bamboo	1967
Shōkansai Iizuka (飯塚小玕斎)	1919	2004	Woodworking	Bamboo	1983
Chikubōsai Maeda II (二代前田竹房斎)	1917	2003	Woodworking	Bamboo	1995
Shōkosai Hayakawa V (五世早川尚古斎)	1932	2011	Woodworking	Bamboo	2003
Tatsuaki Kuroda (黒田辰秋)	1904	1982	Woodworking	Wood	1970
Kōdō Himi (氷見晃堂)	1906	1975	Woodworking	Wood	1970
Shōwasai Ōno (大野昭和斎)	1912	1996	Woodworking	Wood	1984
Zuishin Nakadai (中台瑞真)	1912	2002	Woodworking	Wood	1984
Issei Akiyama (秋山逸生)	1901	1988	Woodworking	Inlaying	1987

=== Other ===
Name	Born	Died	Category	Subcategory	Year designated
Baitei Saita (斎田梅亭)	1900	1981	Other	Kirikane	1981
Daizō Nishide (西出大三)	1913	1995	Other	Kirikane	1985
Sayoko Eri (江里佐代子)	1945	2007	Other	Kirikane	2002
Fumiyuki Yoshida (吉田文之)	1915	2004	Other	Bachiru	1985

=== Papermaking ===
Name	Born	Died	Category	Subcategory	Year designated
Ichibee Iwano VIII (八代岩野市兵衛)	1901	1976	Papermaking	Echizen Hōsho	1968
Eishirō Abe (安部栄四郎)	1902	1984	Papermaking	Ganpi-shi	1968

== List of designated groups (crafts) ==
Group name	Category	Subcategory	Year designated
Kakiemon Pottery Technique Preservation Society (柿右衛門製陶技術保存会, Kakiemonsei Tōgijutsu Hozonkai)	Pottery	Kakiemon	1976
Onta-yaki Technique Preservation Society (小鹿田焼技術保存会, Ontayaki Gijutsu Hozonkai)	Pottery	Onta-yaki	1995
Ise Paper Stencils Technique Preservation Society (伊勢型紙技術保存会, Ise Katagami Gijutsu Hozonkai)	Textiles	Ise Paper Stencils	1993
Kijoka no Bashōfu Preservation Society (喜如嘉の芭蕉布保存会, Kijoka no Bashōfu Hozonkai)	Textiles	Kijoka no Bashōfu	1976
Kumejima-kasuri Preservation Group (久米島紬保持団体, Kumejimakasuri Hoji Dantai)	Textiles	Kumejima-kasuri	2004
Kurume-kasuri Technique Preservation Society (重要無形文化財久留米絣技術保持者会, Jūyō Mukei Bunkazai Kurumekasuri Gijutsu Hozonsha Kai)	Textiles	Kurume-kasuri	1976
Miyako Jōfu Preservation Group (宮古上布保持団体, Miyako Jōfu Hozon Dantai)	Textiles	Miyako Jōfu	1978
Honba Yūkitsu-mugi Technique Preservation Society (本場結城紬技術保持会, Honba Yūkitsumugi Gijutsu Hozonkai)	Textiles	Yūki-tsumugi	1976
Ojiya-chijimi/Echigo Jōfu Technique Preservation Society (越後上布・小千谷縮布技術保存協会, Ojiyachijimi・Echigojōfu Gijutsu Hozonkai)	Textiles	Ojiya-chijimi/Echigo-Jōfu	1976
Wajima-nuri Technique Preservation Society (輪島塗技術保存会, Wajimanuri Gijutsu Hozonkai)	Lacquerware	Wajima-nuri	1977
Hosokawa-shi Preservation Society (細川紙技術者協会, Hosokawashi Hozonkai)	Papermaking	Hosokawa-shi	1978
Sekishūban-shi Preservation Society (石州半紙技術者会, Sekishūbanshi Hozonkai)	Papermaking	Sekishūban-shi	1976
Honmino-shi Preservation Society (本美濃紙保存会, Honminoshi Hozonkai)	Papermaking	Honmino-shi	1976

== See also ==
- Living national treasures of Japan
- List of living national treasures of Japan (performing arts)
- Lists of national treasures of Japan
