= Naha Municipal Tsuboya Pottery Museum =

Museum of art in Naha, Okinawa, Japan

- 那覇市立壺屋焼物博物館
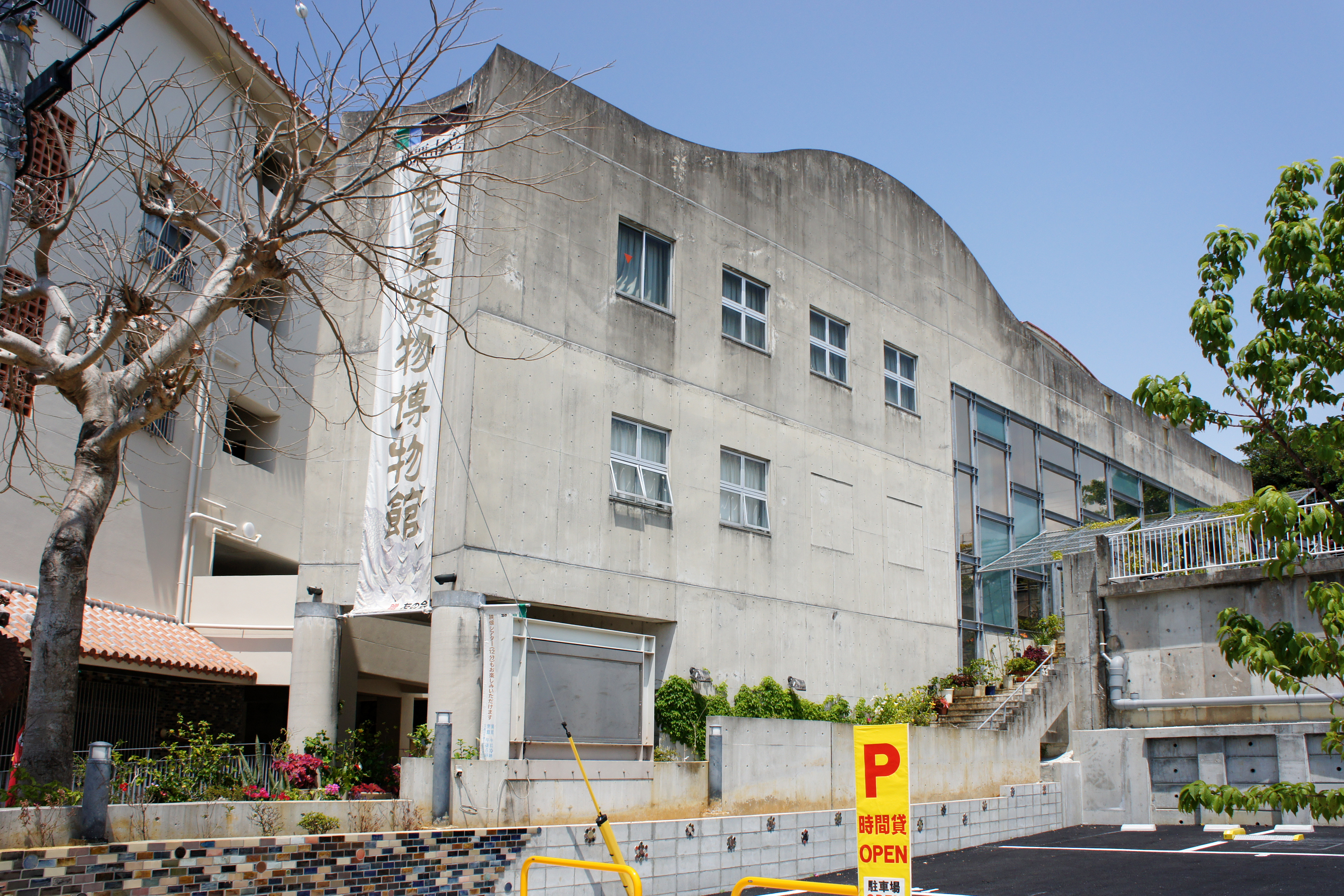

General information
- Location: 1-9-32 Tsuboya, Naha, Okinawa Prefecture, Japan
- Coordinates: 26°12′50″N 127°41′27″E
- Opened: 1 February 1998

Website
- Official website

Naha Municipal Tsuboya Pottery Museum (那覇市立壺屋焼物博物館, Naha Shiritsu Tsuboya-yakimono Hakubutsukan) is a ceramics museum that opened in Naha, Okinawa Prefecture, Japan in 1998. The collection focuses on Ryukyuan pottery, in particular Tsuboya ware.

== See also ==
- Okinawa Prefectural Museum
- Naha City Museum of History
