= Bertil Persson =

Bertil Persson may refer to:

- Bertil Persson (alpine skier)
- Bertil Persson (bishop)
- Bertil Persson (potter)
