= Ryūjo Hori =

Japanese dollmaker

Ryūjo Hori (堀柳女, Hori Ryūjo; 1897–1984) (born Matsue Yamada) was a Japanese dollmaker of traditional dolls.

== Biography ==
Hori started her career as a painter, but switched to doll making after an epiphany with a piece of gum; seeing the half-chewed gum she was fiddling looked something like a human face caused her to become interested in three-dimensional representations of the human form. She began to construct dolls from flour and newspaper paste, using chopsticks as a structural base. In 1930 she joined Yumeji Takehisa's Dontakusha group of artists and subsequently focussed her entire output on doll-making; that same year she had her first exhibition at the Hina Matsuri Festival. Early on in her career, she studied under the famous doll-makers Goyo Hirata and Juzo Kagoshima, both Living National Treasure of Japan.

Her creation of a new style of kimekomi-ningyō doll resulted in her own appointment as a Living National Treasure of Japan in 1955; she was both the first woman to be awarded this accolade and the first artist to be largely self-taught. She commonly sculpted dolls in the likeness of aristocratic women of the Heian period, in paulownia wood or (later in her career) shiso (terracotta overlaid with paper). Her dolls can take up to ten years to complete. In 1983 she was presented to Nancy Reagan during a presidential visit to Japan, who claimed to "admire [Hori's] patience as much as [her] art". (Hori was forbidden from bringing her tools - primarily knives - to the meeting.)
