= Hakuji =

Style of Japanese pottery and porcelain

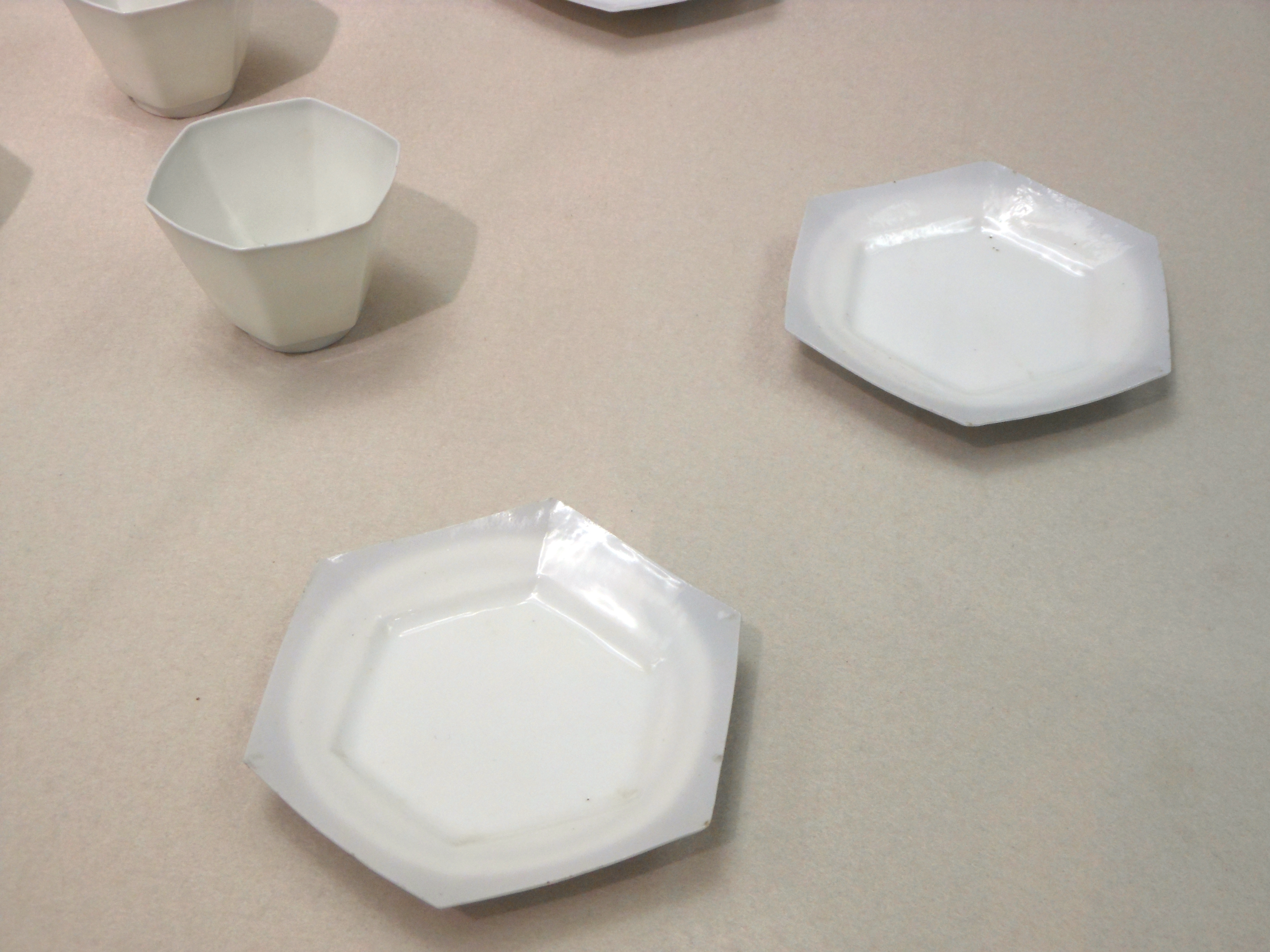
Hakuji white porcelain Arita ware hexagonal bowls and dishes, late Edo period to early Meiji era, 1840–1870

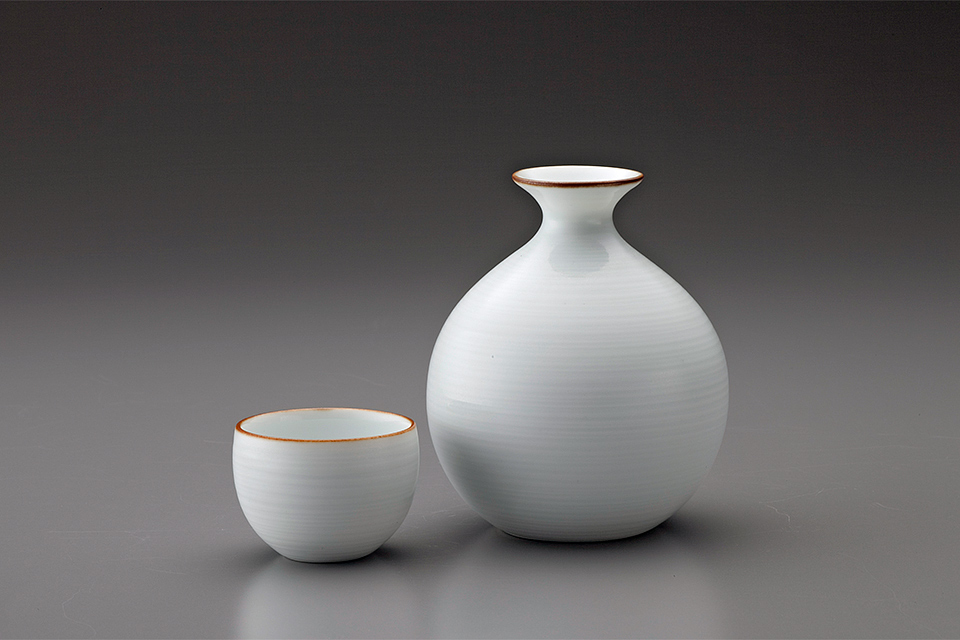
Hakuji sake set designed by Masahiro Mori (1977)

Hakuji (白磁) is a style in Japanese pottery and porcelain, normally white porcelain, which originated as an imitation of Chinese Dehua porcelain. Today the term is used in Japan to refer to plain white porcelain.

It is always plain white without colored patterns and is often seen as bowls, tea pots, cups and other Japanese tableware. It was also used for small figurines, mostly for Buddhist and sometimes Christian religious figures and Japanese genre figures. Like other plain wares, it was appropriate use for various types of vessels for religious use. It was originally developed for the Japanese market, but became one of Japanese export porcelain.

== History ==
Dehua white porcelain is traditionally known among Japanese as hakugorai or "Korean White Ware". Although Korai is a term for an ancient Korean kingdom, the term also functioned as a ubiquitous term for various products from the Korean peninsula.

This is not to suggest that historically Japanese were entirely oblivious to the existence of the Fujian province kilns and their porcelain, now known as Dehua or Blanc de Chine ware (a French term for Chinese white porcelain which is in common usage in the West).

The Dehua kilns are located in Fujian province, opposite the island of Taiwan, was traditionally a trade center for the Chinese economy with its many ports and urban centers. Fujian white ware was meant for all of maritime Asia.

However, a large quantity of these ceramics were intended for a Japanese market before drastic trade restrictions by the mid 1600s. Items were largely Buddhist images and ritual utensils utilized for family altar use. Wares associated with funerals and the dead have perhaps led to a certain disinterest in this ware among present day Japanese, despite an intense interest in other aspects of Chinese ceramic culture and history.

Many examples of this ware have made their way to collections in the west from Japan. Among the countless Buddhist images meant for the Japanese market are those with strongly stylized robes that show an influence from the Kano School of painting that dominated Tokugawa Japan. It seems certain that Dehua white ware was made with Japanese taste in mind.

The plain white incense tripods and associated objects for Japanese religious, ritual observance and the Buddhist Goddesses of Mercy with child figurines that closely resemble the Christian Madonna and Child are designed specifically for a Japanese market. Such figurines were known as Maria Kannon or "Blessed Virgin Goddesses of Mercy" and were part of the "hidden Christian" culture of Tokugawa Japan, which had strictly banned the religion.

White porcelain Buddhist statuary was extensively produced in Japan at the Hirado kilns and elsewhere. The two wares can be easily distinguished. Japanese figures are usually closed on the base and a small hole for ventilation can be seen. Hirado ware also displays a slightly orange tinge on unglazed areas.

In the early 1600s, Lord Nabeshima Naoshige (1537–1619) of the Saga Domain brought over a number of Korean potters, including the potter Ri Sampei (Yi Sam Pyong). In 1616, they discovered a superior white-stoned clay at a mountain in Arita. This clay was used for the production of Japanese white porcelain. The production of Hakuji in Arita also continued during the Meiji era.

Hakuji is still produced today for various vessels. Masahiro Mori has designed a number of modern Hakuji ware. Another artist is Seigo Nakamura, who is an Arita ware artist, and Inoue Manji. The retail company Muji brought out its own line of Hakuji home ware, which is produced out of ground translucent Amakusa stones kneaded into clay, using traditional techniques.

Hakuji was declared in 1995 by the government to be an Intangible Cultural Property of Japan.

== Seihakuji ==
Another type is seihakuji (青白磁) porcelain, where the glaze has subtle colour gradations of icy, bluish white. In Chinese this type of glaze is known as Qingbai ware, which is more greenish-white in colour, and is therefore also considered a form of celadon (青磁, seiji). Qingbai's history goes back to the Song dynasty. It is biscuit-fired and painted with a glaze containing small amounts of iron. This turns a bluish colour when fired again.

Some of the artisans who specialise in seihakuji are Fukami Sueharu, Suzuki Osamu, and Yagi Akira. Kaiji Tsukamoto (塚本快示) (1912–1990) was nominated a Living National Treasure in 1983 for his works in Seihakuji.

== Other sources ==
- Shanghai Art Museum, Fujian Ceramics and Porcelain, Chinese Ceramics, vol. 27, Kyoto, 1983.
- Kato Tokoku, Genshoku toki daijiten (A Dictionary of Ceramics in Color), Tokyo, 1972, p. 777.
