= Ryukyuan pottery =

Traditional Ryukyuans pottery

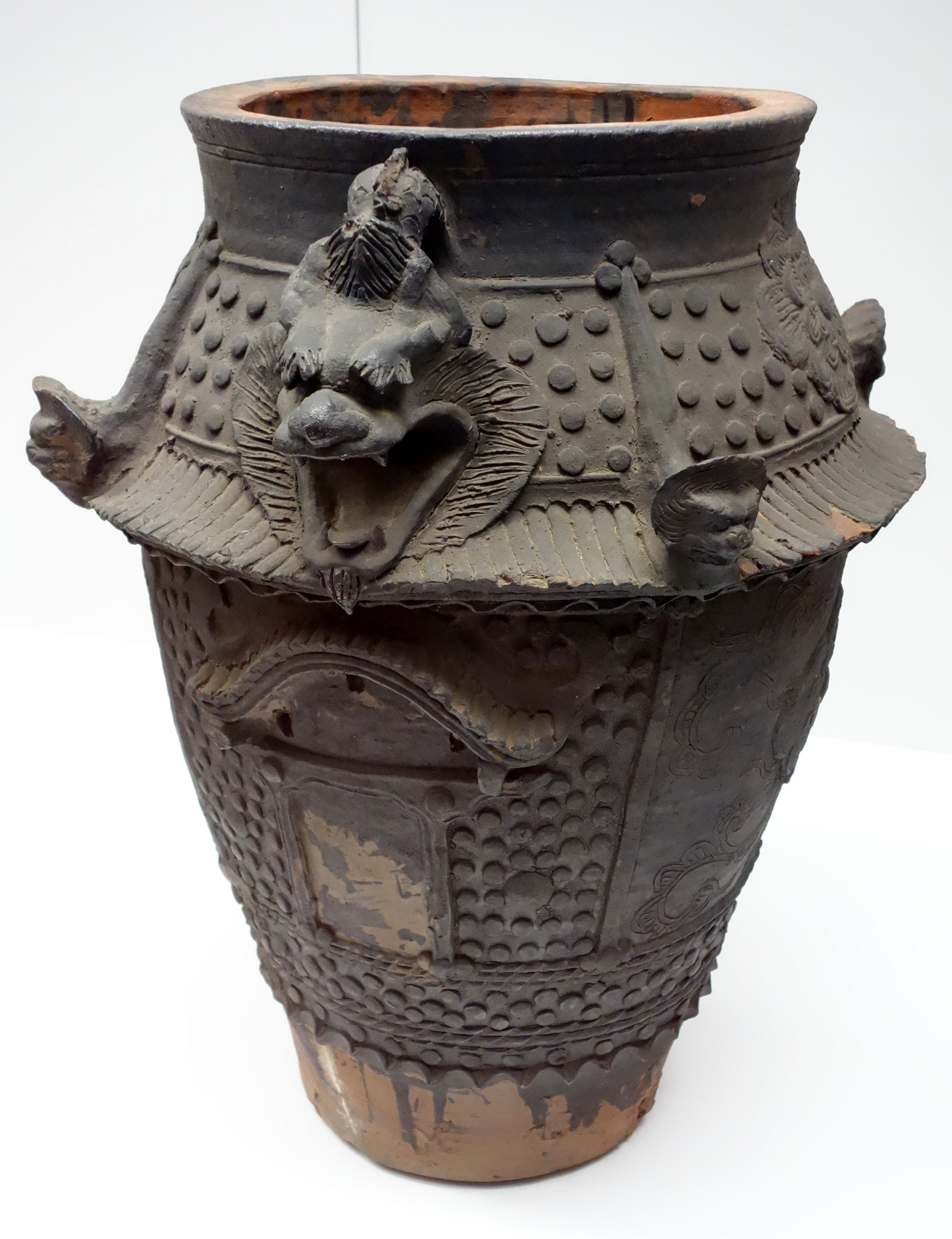
Tsuboya ware urn, second Shō Dynasty, Ryukyu Kingdom, 19th century

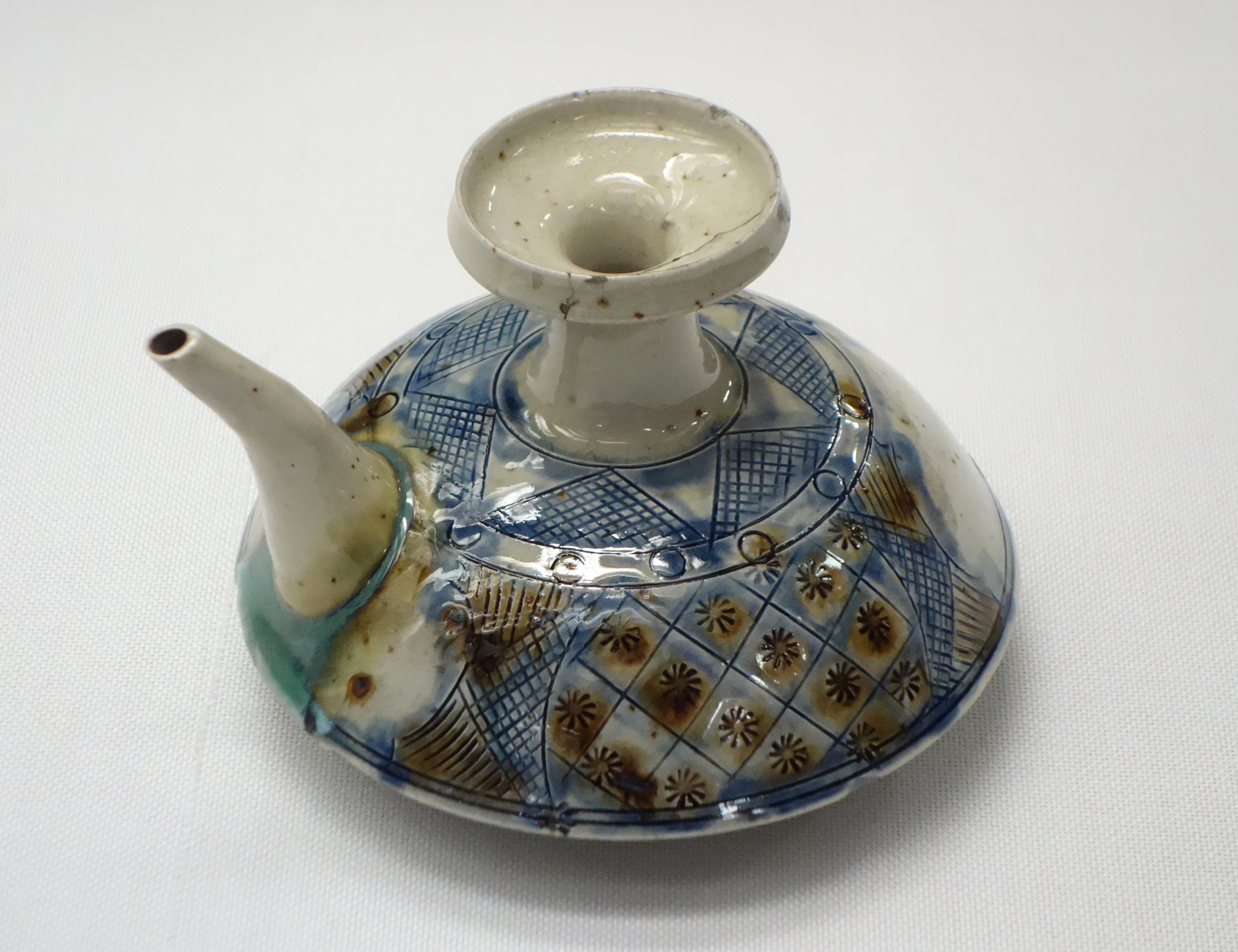
Tsuboya ware wine bottle with spout, second Shō Dynasty, Ryukyu Kingdom, 19th century

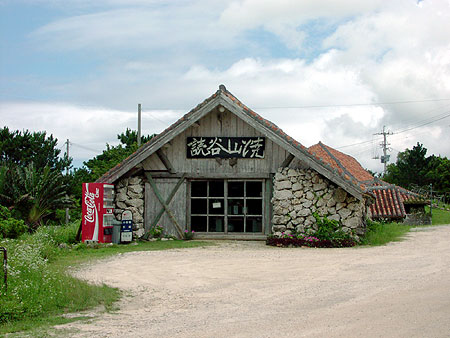
Kiln in Yuntan, one of the production centres of Yachimun

Ryukyuan pottery (Okinawan: 焼物, romanized: yachimun, Japanese: 琉球焼, romanized: Ryūkyū-yaki) include earthenware and stoneware items that are traditionally made on the Ryukyu Islands (Okinawa) in east Asia.

== History ==
Ryukyuan pottery first appeared during the Gusuku period (c. 1100s-1400s), when it was introduced from China.

Tsuboya became the centre of production in 1682 after the kilns of Chibana, Wakuta, and Takaraguchi were consolidated under the Ryukyu Kingdom government. The two sub-types of Tsuboya ware were the generally unglazed Ara-yachi and the glazed Jō-yachi.

Most of the kilns had to move out of Tsuboya after the end of the Pacific War due to the smoke they produced. Production moved to the villages of Yomitan and Ōgimi, where they continued the tradition of Yachimun. In 1954, Jirō Kinjō, a potter from Tsuboya, became the first Okinawan to be named a Living National Treasure.

In addition to dishes, vessels, and roof tiles, Ryukyuan pottery is especially known for the production of funerary urns, and shisa, lion-like guardians placed on rooftops and at gates to protect homes and other spaces from evil spirits.
