= Masamine Sumitani =

Japanese swordsmith

Masamine Sumitani (隅谷正峯; born Sumitani Yoichiro; 14 January 1921 – 12 December 1998) was a Japanese swordsmith.

Sumitani's family ran a soy-sauce manufacturing business, but rather than entering the family trade, Masamine opted to study at Ritsumeikan University, with a view to becoming a swordsmith, graduating in 1941 with a degree in mechanical engineering. After his graduation, Sumitani remained at Kyoto, studying (alongside Masayuki Nagare) under Sakurai Masayuki. When the University's sword studio was destroyed in a fire in 1942, Sumitani moved to Onomichi to continue his education at the Foundation of National Japanese Sword Studies and the Kokoku Japanese Sword Temper Workshop there.

Sumitani settled in Mattō, Ishikawa. He worked in the Bizen tradition, and was noted for his choji midare or "clove patterns" along the hamon of his blades. As well as swords, Sumitani also specialised in the forging of tosu knives and was a practitioner of bachiru.

In 1975 he co-founded the Zen Nihon Toshokai ("Japanese Swordsmith's Association"), and served as the group's Vice-Secretary.

== Awards and recognitions ==
Sumitani won numerous prizes in national competitions, including the 1972 Kunzan Award and the Masamune Prize (the highest award) at the Nihon Bijutsu Token Hozon Kyokai contest in 1966, 1965 and 1974. He was given the status of mukansa, meaning that his work was no longer subject to judgement in competition. In 1979, he was recognised as a Living National Treasure.
