= Kobashigawa Eishō =

Jar by 'Kobashigawa Eishō, Honolulu Museum of Art

Kobashigawa Eishō (小橋川永昌, 1909–1978) was a potter born in Tsuboya, a district within the Okinawan capital of Naha, Japan. He is considered one of the "Three Potters of Tsuboya" (Tsuboya no sannin otoko), along with Kinjō Jirō and Aragaki Eisaburō. Kobashigawa Eishō studied pottery with his father Kobashigawa Niō and is also known as Kobashigawa Niō II. Eishō is credited with rediscovering the local materials used for the distinctive red enamel (aka-e) that characterized traditional Okinawan ceramics. The pictured jar, from the collection of the Honolulu Museum of Art, is an example of how Kobashigawa Eishō revived the Ryukyu Kingdom's tradition of Tsuboya ware.
