= Ito Sekisui V =

Japanese potter (born 1941)

Ito Sekisui V (伊藤赤水五代目; born 1941) is a Japanese potter. Ito Sekisui V is the 14th generation of his family to follow a long tradition of ceramic work. He was given the birth name Yoichi Ito, the first character of his name ("yo" 窯) being the Japanese word for "kiln". After his father Ito Sekisui IV's death (when Yoichi was 19), he studied ceramics at Kyoto University. After graduating in 1966, he returned to his home town of Sado to continue the family business.

His work was displayed at the Traditional Arts and Crafts Exhibition in 1972. In 1973, he won first prize at the second Japan Ceramic Art Exhibition.

In the 1980s, Sekisui V started to create neriage works as well as his family's traditional mumyoi-yaki pieces and, in 2003, he was appointed a Living National Treasure of Japan for his work in these fields.
