= Bertil Persson (potter) =

Swedish potter (born 1940)

- Born: Nils Bertil Persson; 1940 (age 85–86); Malmö, Sweden
- Occupation: potter

Bertil Persson (Japanese: ベアティル・ペアソン; born 1940) is a Swedish Hagi ware potter based in Japan.

== Biography ==
Persson graduated from Skånska målarskolan in Malmö in 1958 and was employed by Royal Copenhagen in Denmark the same year, where he worked with painting sets of the company's Flora Danica porcelain dining set.

After a company-sponsored trip to various locales in Japan to study Japanese pottery and porcelain in 1969, Persson decided to give up porcelain painting and become a potter. After the master of one of the kilns he had visited in Hagi reluctantly agreed to accept him as an apprentice, he moved to Hagi in 1970 and underwent a 7-year apprenticeship, before eventually setting up his own kiln named Nanmyōjigama (南明寺窯, lit. 'kiln of the Nanmyō temple') in Hagi, Yamaguchi where he also lives.

In the beginning, Persson made traditional Hagi ware as tradition dictated but he gradually began experimenting with painting his pottery and by time, this became his trademark. He has become especially known for his painted ceramic plates, mainly with wild flower motives, which he himself refers to as "e-Hagi" (絵萩, "painted Hagi (ware)").

In 2002, he was awarded a "Distinguished Cultural Services Award" (文化功労賞, bunka kōrōshō) by Hagi city.

The Japan Times has described him as "one of the most popular artists of Hagi ware" while the Yamaguchi Shimbun remarked he has many (domestic) admirers.
