= Tsuboya ware =

Type of Japanese pottery

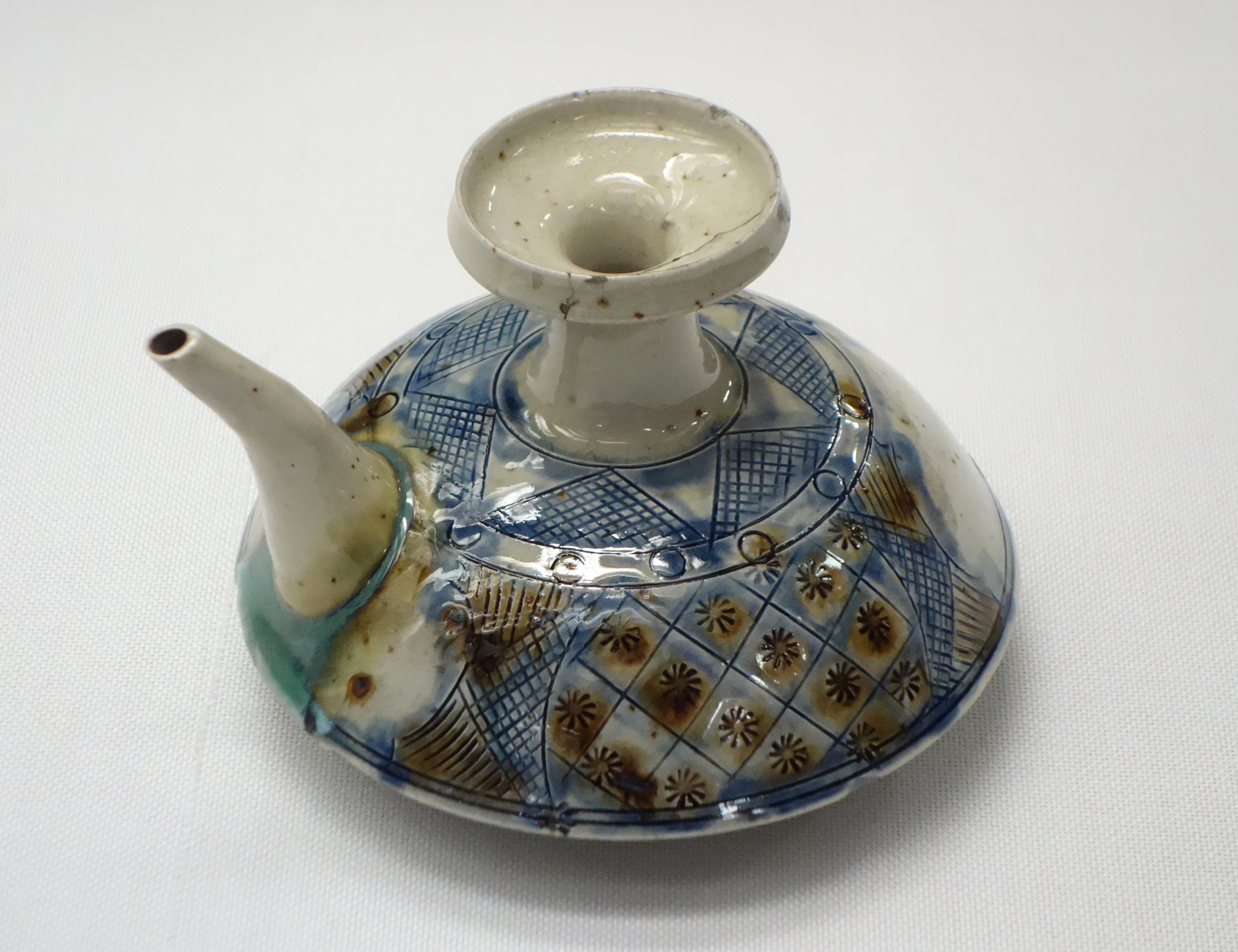
Tsuboya ware wine bottle with spout, second Shō Dynasty, Ryukyu Kingdom, 19th century

Tsuboya ware (壺屋焼, Tsuboya-yaki), or Cibuja-jaci in Okinawan, is a type of Ryukyuan pottery traditionally produced in Tsuboya, a pottery district in the city of Naha, in the prefecture Okinawa. Okinawan craftsmen began engaging in this form of pottery in 1682, and have since passed down the craft for generations. The most notable feature of this ware is its enamel decoration, unique to Okinawa.

Originally, ceramics produced in this style were used primarily by common, middle-class people. However, during the Taisho period (1912–1926), the style was popularized by folk art proponents like Muneyoshi Yanagi.

Tsuboya ware is categorized into two types: arayachi (荒焼; lit. 'rough pottery') and jōyachi (上焼; lit. 'high pottery'). While arayachi is a more simple style and takes the form of vessels for water or alcohol, jōyachi can be recognized by its rich enamel decoration.

== History ==
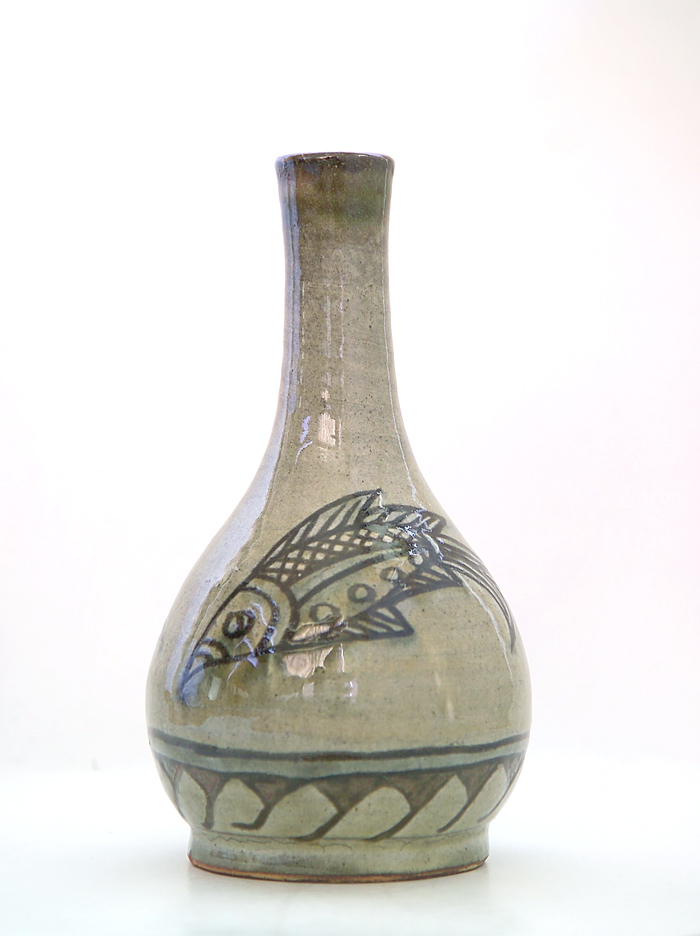
Vessel by Jirō Kinjō

According to Okinawan history, Tsuboya ware originated during the 17th century after the Ryukyu kingdom was replaced by a feudal military government ruled by the Tokugawa shogunate. As this brought Ryukyu's prosperous trade with China and other southeast Asian countries to an end, ceramics from those countries were no longer imported to Ryukyu. In order to fill the continuous need for ceramic vessels, foreign potters primarily from Korea were summoned to Ryukyu to create pottery for its occupants. These Korean ceramicists brought a more advanced pottery production technology to the region and formed the Tsuboya pottery district in order to produce traditional ceramic vessels.

During the Meiji period (1868–1912), ceramics were mass-produced using industrial techniques, and the more traditional handicrafts such as Tsuboya ware declined in popularity, However, the folk craft movement known as the Taisho period (1912–1926) brought public recognition back to the traditional arts, and Tsuboya ware was embraced as a significant part of Okinawan cultural heritage.

== Production ==
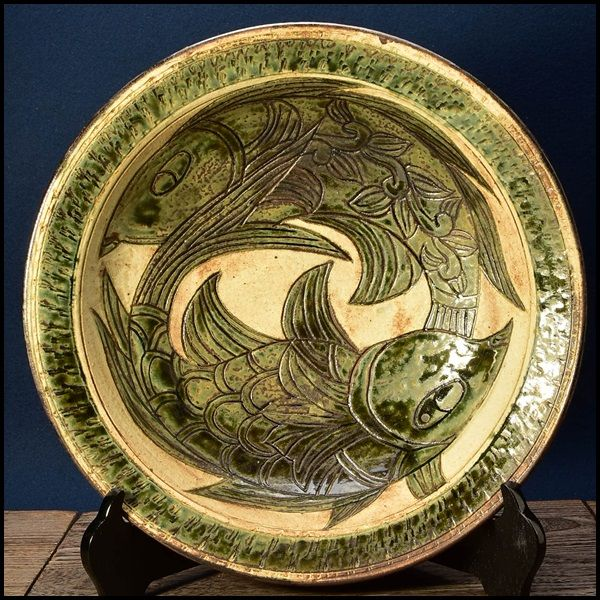
Large plate with fish motif, by Jirō Kinjō

Tsuboya ware is produced by casting the clay either by hand or by using a mold. After the desired form is produced, the surface is applied with a slip which is made by dissolving a type of clay unique to Tsuboya known as gushitou. While the enamel dries, the pottery is engraved with decorative patterns.

Then, an enamel overglaze is applied using natural materials from Okinawa such as coral or rice husks, which overlay the pottery with various natural colors. The pottery is then fired once.

Traditionally, a climbing kiln would have been used for firing Tsuboya ware, but today this type of kiln is restricted due to the smoke pollution it creates in nearby residential areas, so gas kilns are primarily used.

== Notable potters ==
- Jirō Kinjō, first Okinawan Living National Treasure
- Kobashigawa Eishō
- Aragaki Eisaburō

== See also ==
- Japanese craft
- List of Traditional Crafts of Japan
