= Karatsu ware =

Style of Japanese pottery

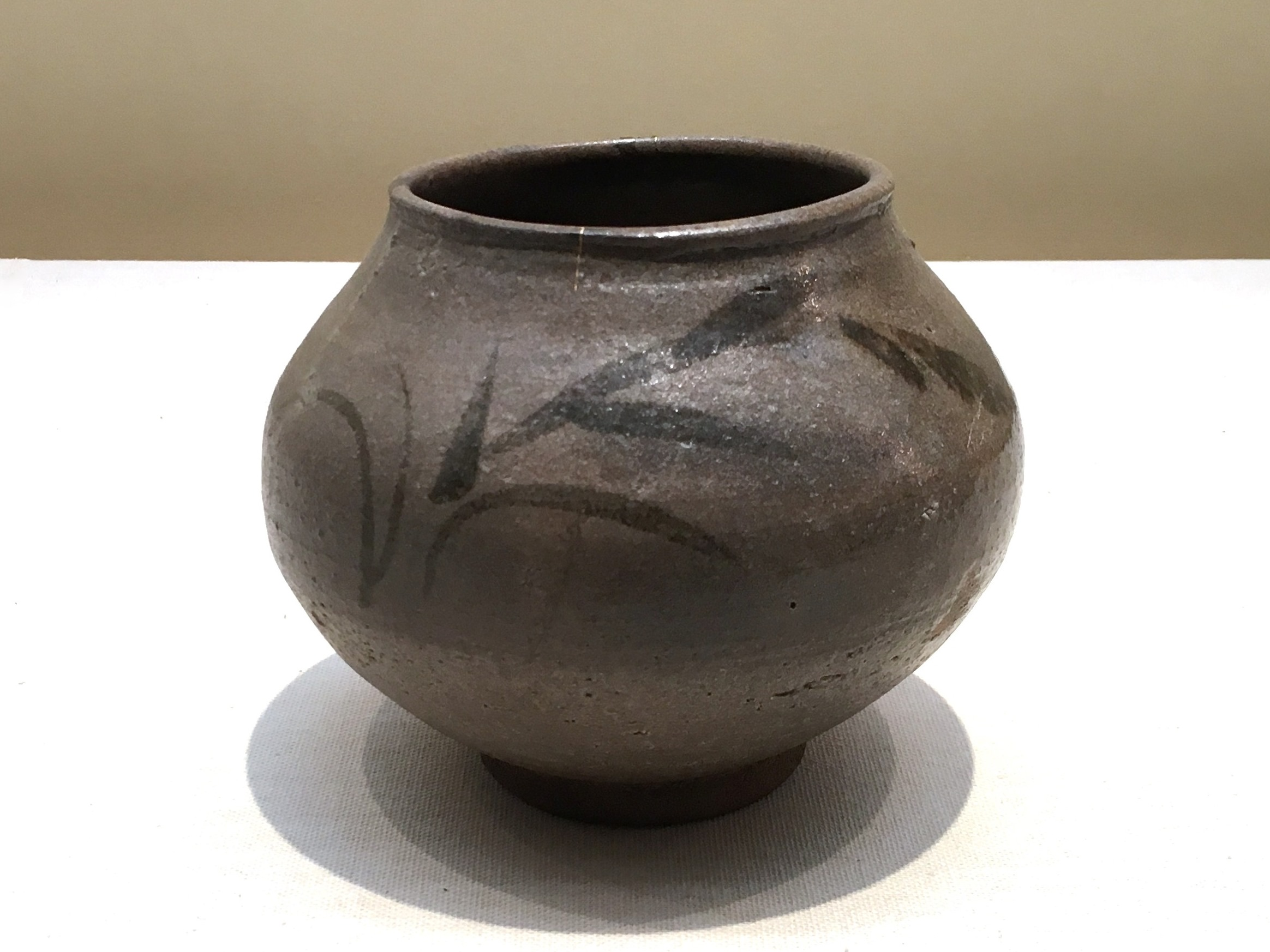
Karatsu ware E-karatsu style fresh water container, reeds design. Momoyama period, early 17th century

Karatsu ware (唐津焼, Karatsu-yaki) is a style of Japanese pottery produced traditionally in and around Karatsu, Saga Prefecture.

== History ==
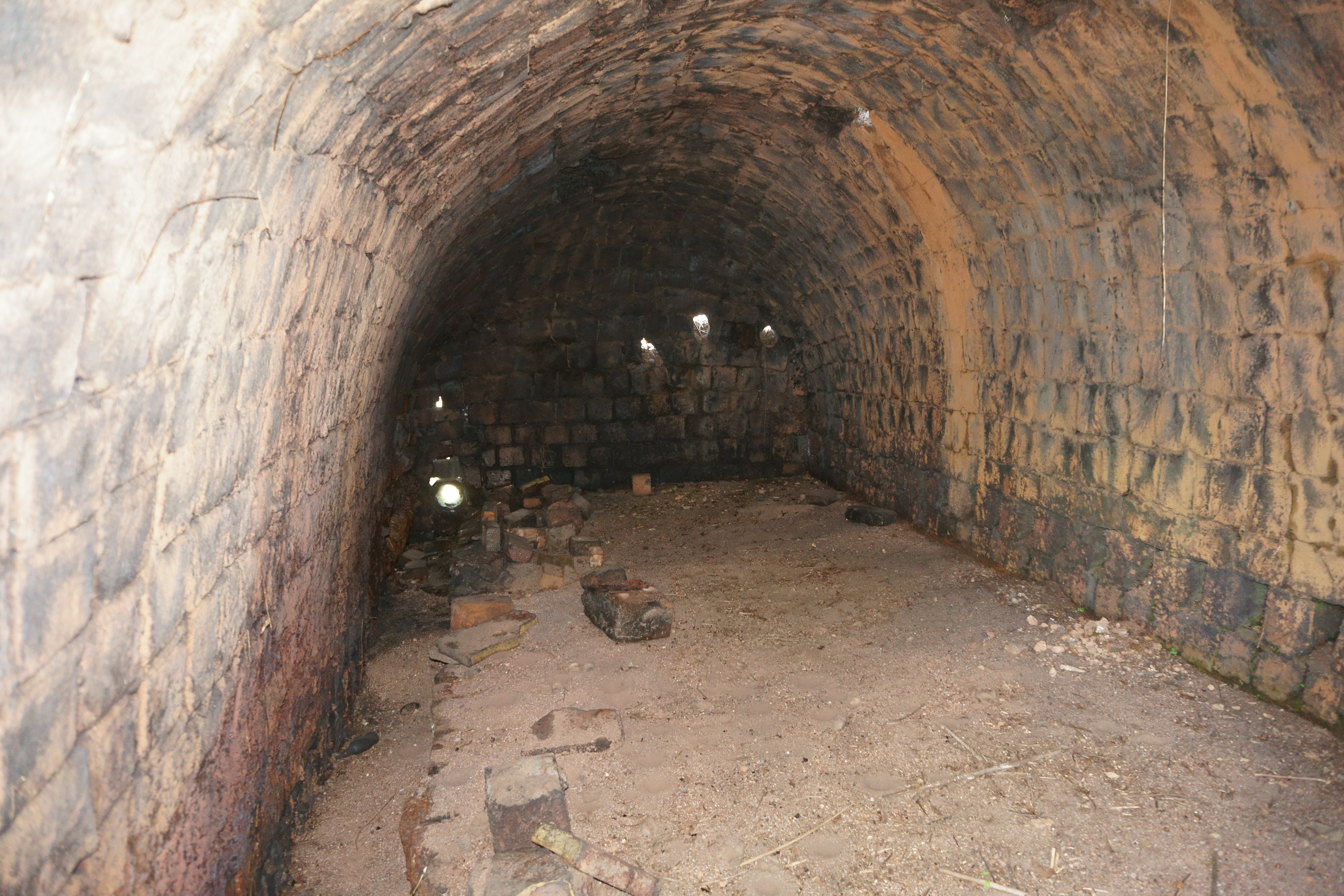
Old Yokomakura jar climbing kiln fourth chamber, in Karatsu

Karatsu has been a hub of foreign commerce and trade since ancient times, and a center of pottery production since the Azuchi-Momoyama period. Today there are many kilns in use as well as ruins of kilns scattered throughout the area in Saga Prefecture. The pottery style draws its name from the location where it is produced.

The techniques used in creating Karatsu ware are believed to have been imported from the Korean Peninsula during the Japanese invasions of Korea during the late 16th century, though some theories suggest the techniques may have been in use prior to this period.

Karatsu ware was originally created for everyday use items such as tableware, pitchers, and other household items. The style is considered a good example of the wabi-sabi aesthetic, and Karatsu ware bowls, plates, and other implements are often used in tea ceremonies. Pottery in general is often called "Karatsu ware" in Western Japan due to how much pottery was produced in the Karatsu area.

There is a famous ancient saying—First Raku, second Hagi, third Karatsu—when referring to ceramic ware used for the Japanese tea ceremony. It is considered one of the top styles of pottery for use in tea ceremonies in Japan.

== Characteristics ==
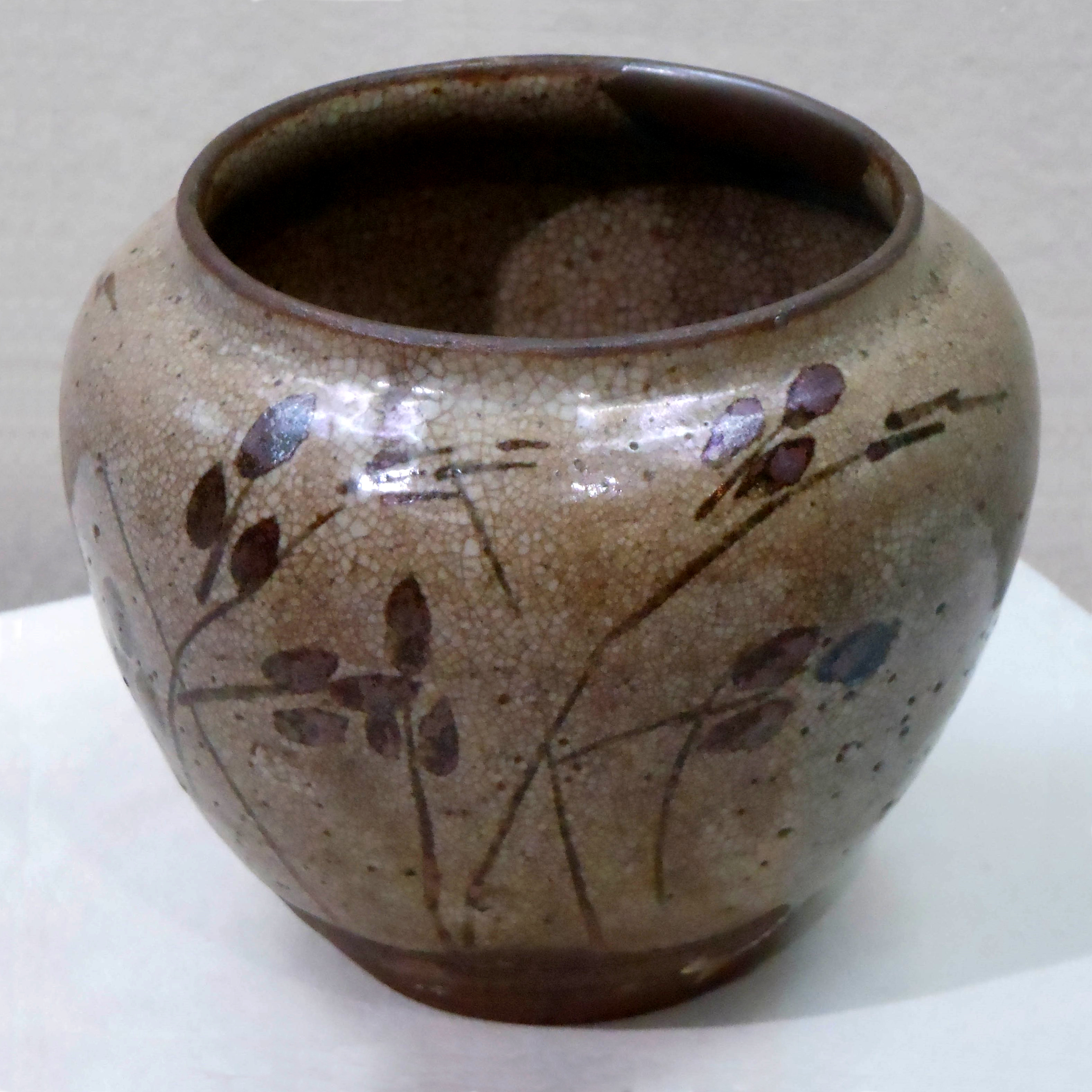
E-karatsu jar with bush clover design, stoneware with iron-brown underglaze. Hizen, Momoyama period, 1590-1610s

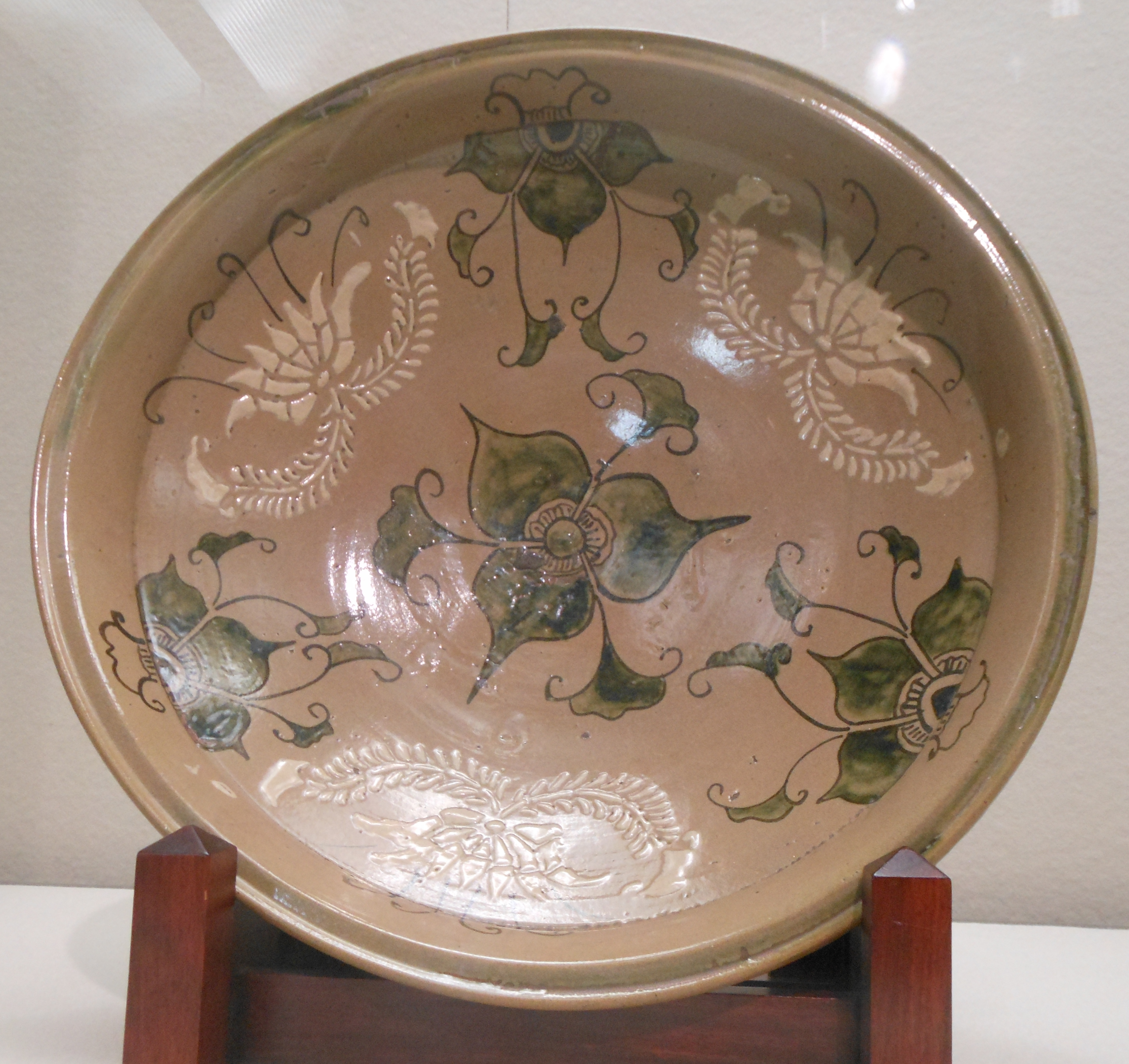
Nisai large dish with stenciled design of stylized flower, copper-green glaze. Hizen, Edo period, 1610-1640s

There are several variations produced in surrounding areas: Takeo Kokaratsu ware (produced in the adjoining city of Takeo), Taku Kokaratsu ware, and Hirado Kokaratsu ware. There are also varieties based on style: Painted Karatsu, Mottled Karatsu, and Korean Karatsu. Karatsu ware is known for its sturdiness and simple style; and is considered a traditional Japanese handicraft.

Fired in climbing kilns, Karatsu ware is made from a clay high in iron and can be undecorated or decorated with an iron-based underglaze, giving an earthy, simple, and natural feeling to the pieces.

A variety of styles of Karatsu ware exist.

- Brush Decorated Karatsu (絵唐津, E-Karatsu)

Various images (flowers, plants, birds, mythological creatures, etc.) are painted onto the piece using an iron-based underglaze, then the piece is fired with a semitransparent gray glaze which allows the underglaze to show. This style is known for its earthy color and simple design.

- Korean Karatsu (朝鮮唐津, Chōsen Karatsu)

This traditional style was introduced by one or more potters brought from the Joseon Dynasty during the Japanese invasions of Korea. It features a black glaze placed under a white glaze which has been fired with straw. The two glazes run together and give a feeling of opposites.

- Mottled Karatsu (斑唐津, Madara Karatsu)

- Mishima Karatsu (三島唐津)

- White Slip Karatsu (粉引唐津, Kohiki Karatsu)

- Okugōrai (奥高麗)

- Seto Karatsu (瀬戸唐津)

- Green Karatsu (青唐津, Aokaratsu)

- Yellow Karatsu (黄唐津, Kikaratsu)

- Carved Karatsu (彫唐津, Hori Karatsu)

- Brushed Slip Karatsu (刷毛目唐津, Hakeme Karatsu)

- Combed Slip Karatsu (櫛目唐津, Kushime Karatsu)

- Snakeskin Karatsu (蛇蝎唐津, Jakatsu Karatsu)

- Nisai Karatsu (二彩唐津)

== Gallery ==
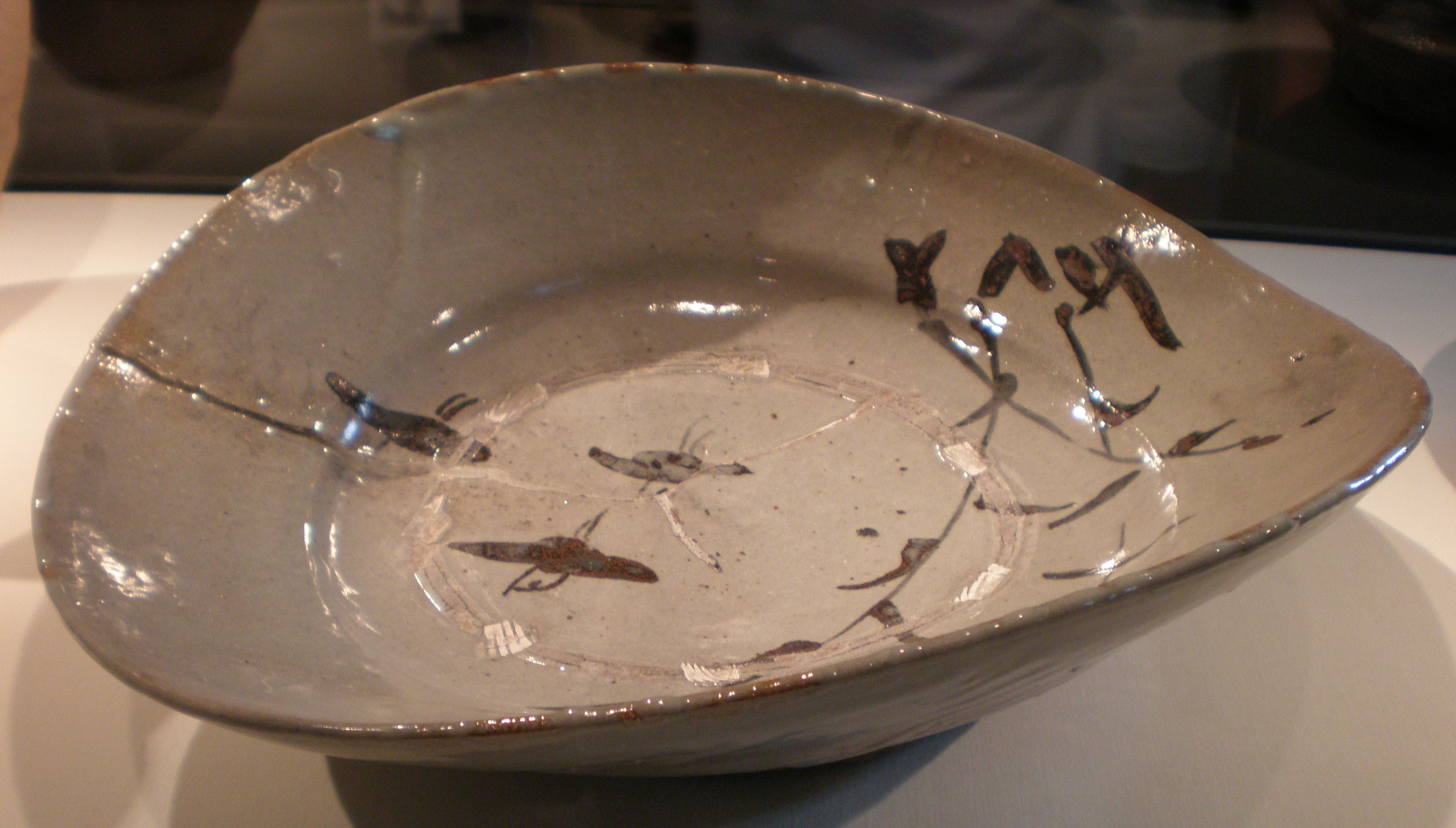
Large bowl with a millet and sparrow design, stoneware with glaze iron-oxide decoration, Momoyama period, approx. 1573-1615

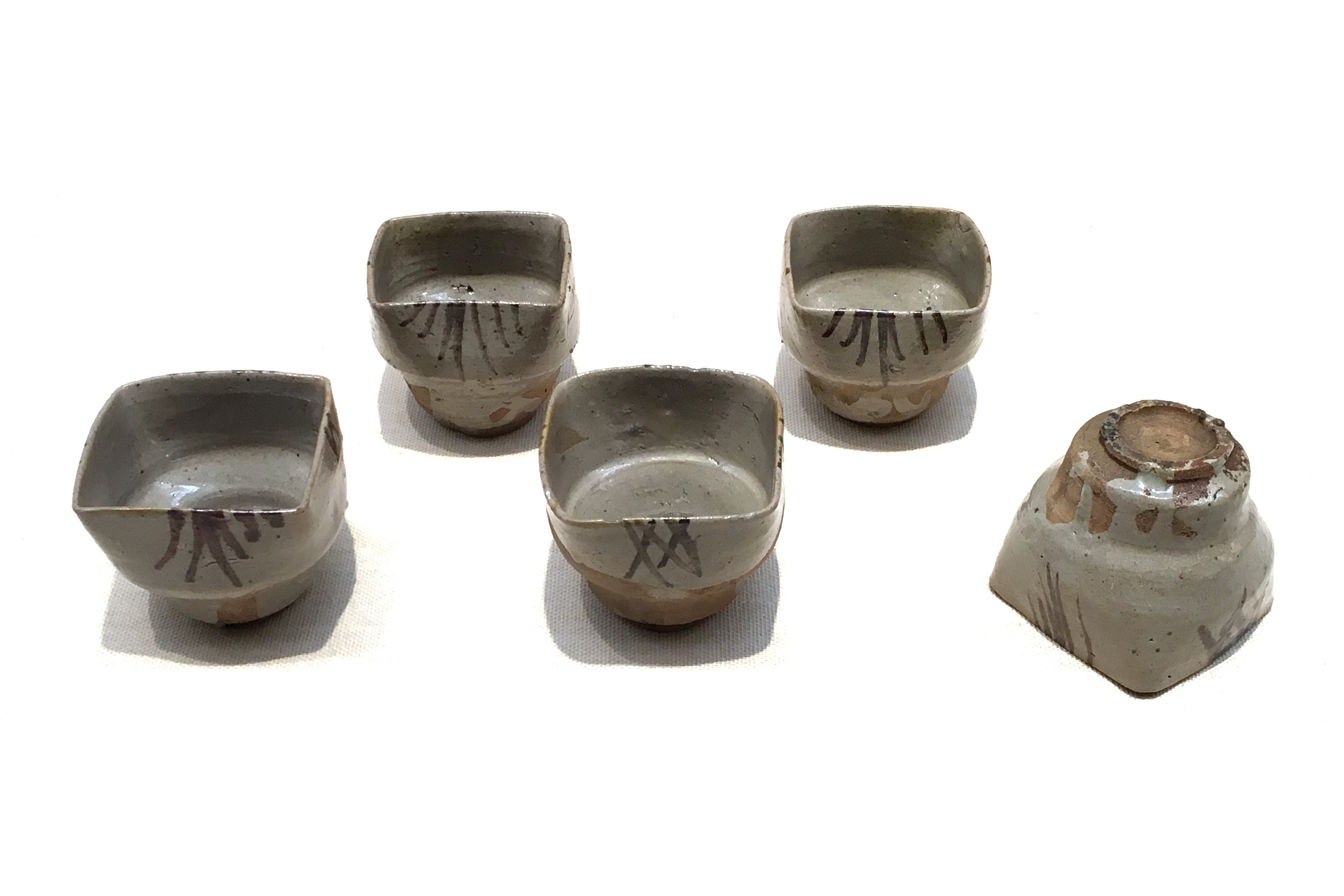
Shallow bowls, grass pattern. Momoyama period, 17th century

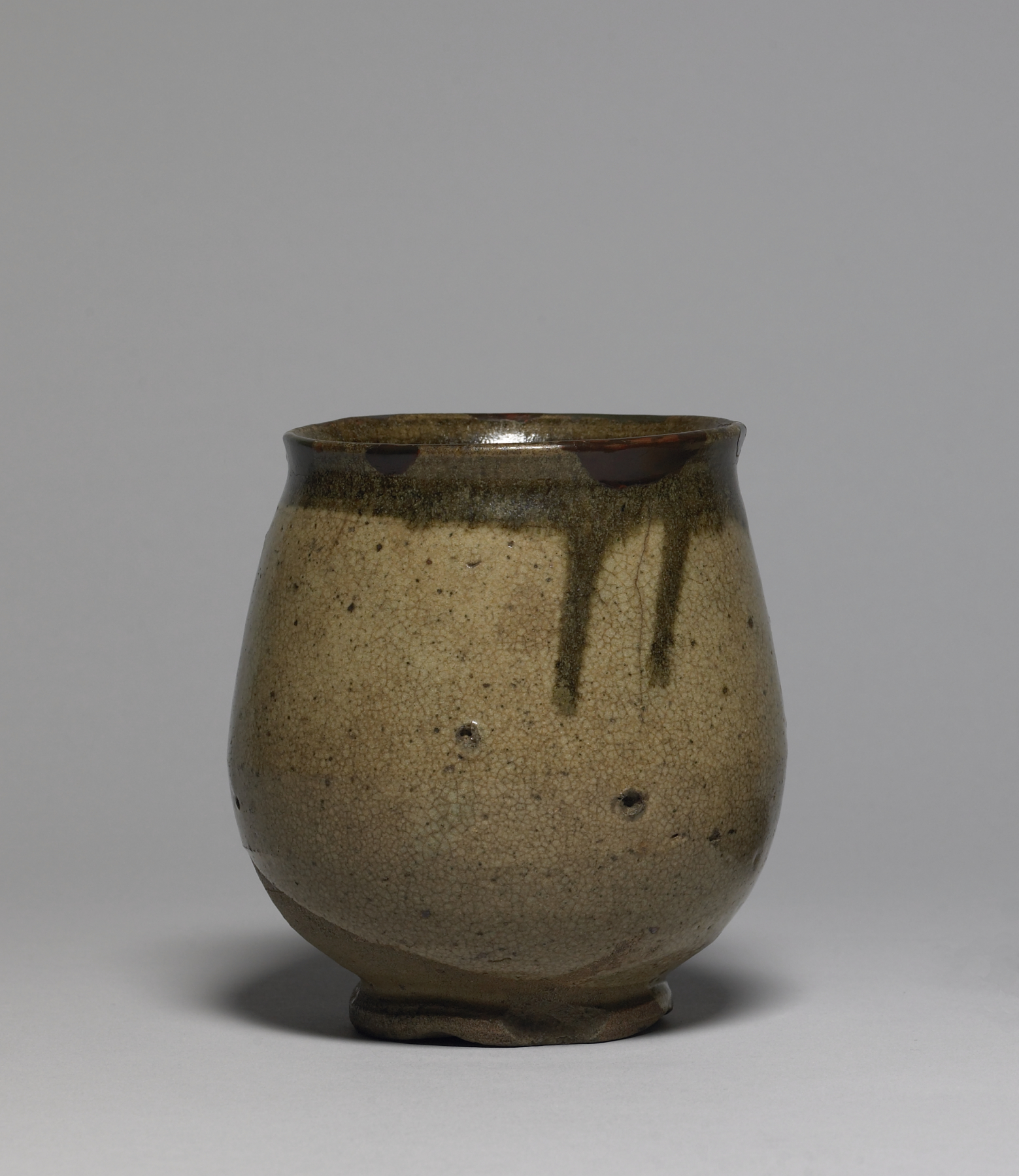
Tea ceremony vessel, stoneware with ash glaze, Edo period, early 19th century
