= Hagi ware =

Type of Japanese pottery

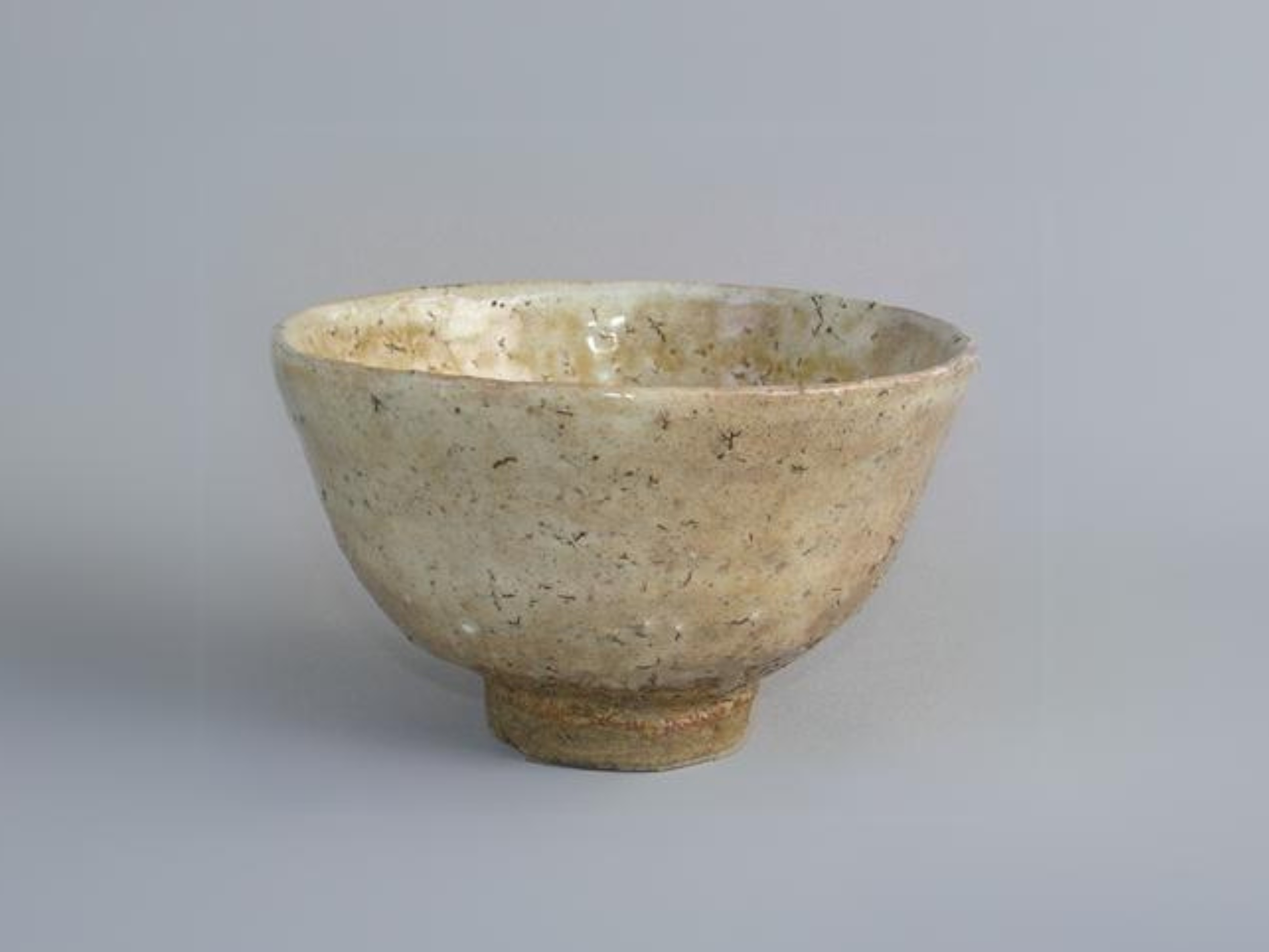
Hagi ware tea bowl (chawan), by Tamamura Shogetsu, 20th century

Hagi ware (萩焼, Hagi-yaki) is a type of Japanese pottery traditionally originated from the town of Hagi, Yamaguchi, in the former Nagato Province.

== History ==
The origins of Hagi ware can be traced back to the arrival of Korean potters to Hagi, a town situated in Yamaguchi Prefecture on the Japan Sea, following Japan's military invasion of the Korean peninsula in the late 16th century. As a result, a large number of Korean craftsmen were abducted and transported to Japan, where they played a crucial role in establishing new pottery types such as Satsuma, Arita, and Hagi ware ("hagi yaki").

The local feudal lord of the Hagi area at the time, Terumoto Mōri, had appointed potters in a castle town of Matsumoto (presently the city of Hagi) in order to create Hagi wares for his personal tea ceremonies and as gifts. The potters in Matsumoto steadily increased their production so that more kilns were established in Fukawa territory (presently the city of Nagato) during the mid-17th century. However, due to the Meiji Restoration in 1868, the potters employed by Lord Mori were dismissed and began to run their own independent businesses. Gradually, more kilns were built outside of Hagi, spreading to the Miyano area of Yamaguchi city and also to other parts of the southwest region of Yamaguchi Prefecture. Thus, Hagi ware production continued throughout the Edo era.

The tradition of tea ceremonies and tea houses continue to this day in Hagi, which in turn created demand for vessels. Some well-known tea ceremony artists include Koraizaemon Saka XI and Koraizaemon Saka XII (高麗左衛門), Sakata Deika XIII (坂田泥華), Tobei Tahara XII (田原陶兵衛), Yū Okada (岡田裕), and Masanao Kaneta(兼田昌尚). Another expert is Miwako Masaki. A non-Japanese artist is Bertil Persson, a Swede.

== Characteristics ==
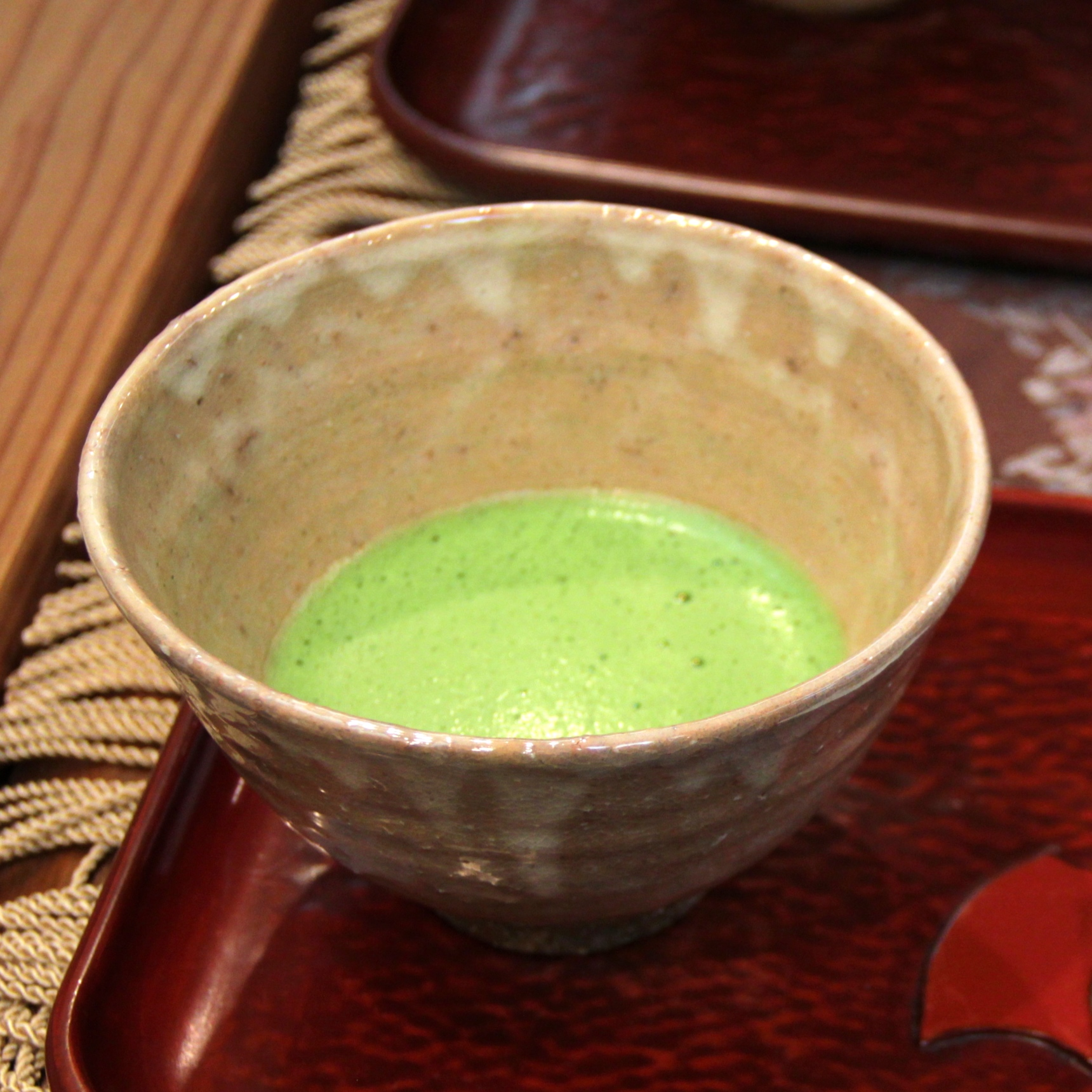
Hagi ware chawan with matcha green tea, by Yū Okada (2011)

The subtle form and natural, subdued colors of Hagi ware are highly regarded. In particular, the beautiful contrast between the bright green color of matcha [tea] and the warm neutral tones of Hagi ware is aesthetically notable. Regarding tea wares, there is a famous expression in Japanese that is "Raku first, Hagi second and Karatsu third". This old tea adage indicates the rank of tea wares preferred for tea ceremonies. It implies that tea wares with distinguishing characteristics of earthy feel and looks are most valued.

Two types of fine-grained soft clay are used as the base material. The earth is first mixed with water, then strained. During the process, wood chips are often added, causing the less dense parts to rise while the heavier parts sink to the bottom. This preparation process is repeated for two weeks until the water is entirely filtered without any residues, and the pure, fine clay is obtained from the bottom of the vat. The reddish to orange color of the clay is important as it will determine the texture and color of the Hagi surface.

The beauty of Hagi ware is appreciated not only for its earthy colors but also for the glaze. The translucent beige glaze is to draw out the natural, deep colors of the clay. After being heated in the kiln, the glaze creates its signature fine web of cracks and fine pores -known as kan-nyuu (貫入) or crazing- while cooling. Throughout the heating and cooling process, the cracks form because the glaze shrinks faster than the clay. Over time, a Hagi ware user might notice the color of the glaze getting darker. This is natural as the slightly porous surface absorbs the tea residues or sake through its tiny crackles, maturing over time.

One might also notice a chip on the bottom, which was deliberately made by local pottery makers to sell the ware to merchants instead of presenting them as gifts to the Mōri clan during the Edo period. Even today, Hagi ware continues to evolve in a response to the demands of customers, the aesthetic preferences of Hagi artists, and the environment.

=== White Hagi ===
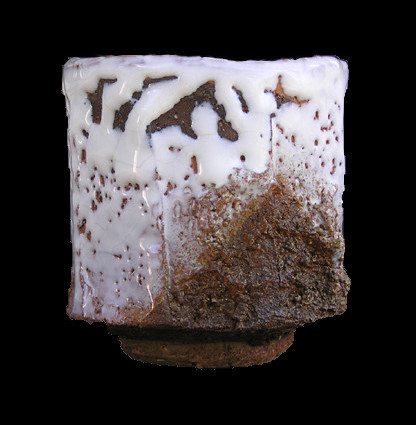
oni (demon) Hagi bowl, by Shibuya Deishi, 20th century

The white Hagi was developed by the Miwa family, one of the most highly regarded potting families in all of Japan. Their kiln was established in Kanbun 3 (1663) in the Matsumoto area of Hagi in order to produce tea utensils for Lord Mori Terumoto. Successive generations of Miwa potters have produced all sorts of works besides tea ware, including Raku ware (Kyusetsu I and IV studied in Kyoto), figurines of mythical creatures (Kyusetsu VI and VII), and vessels for the table.

In the 1930s, Miwa Kyuwa (Kyusetsu X) revitalized the Hagi tea world with his warm and sensuous chawan and other tea utensils. He adjusted the old pottery recipe by altering how the straw was burned and mixing it into the glaze solution to ultimately create a purer shade of white. Later, his younger brother Miwa Jusetsu (Kyusetsu XI) added power and strength with his Oni-Hagi (devil-Hagi) chawan. The brothers were named as living national treasures by the Japanese government for their Hagi wares in 1970 and 1983, respectively. Jusetsu's eldest son is Ryosaku, who is now known as Kyusetsu XII because his father passed on the honor to him in April 2003.

The mixture for the black glaze contains high levels of iron and enhances the contrast with the white glaze. The mixture for the white glaze contains Feldspar and wood ash. It is initially black and very thick in its viscosity, particularly noticeable in the way it flows down the vessel. Typically, the potter dips the vessel into the vat with the glaze for the white, and in extracting the vessel he or she can move the vessel around for the glaze to drip slowly in the direction desired. The aim is for the slowly dripping glaze to add dimension and movement to the piece - for example, in expressing the passage of time through the flow of the drip. The carbon in the glaze then evaporates during firing and turns into a translucent white, with the high iron glaze in black emerging from under the background. The rich white glaze that coats the vessel and the black glaze in the background create a strong contrast with each other.

== See also ==
- Hagiyama ware

== Literature ==
- Wilson, Richard L. Inside Japanese Ceramics. Weatherhill, New York and Tokyo, Second Edition 2005. ISBN 0-8348-0442-5
