= Bachiru =

Bachiru (撥鏤) is the Japanese art technique and Japanese craft of engraving dyed ivory.

Bachiru originated in Tang dynasty China, and was introduced to Japan in the 8th century C.E. The ivory pieces to be decorated are first stained with pigment (usually red, green or blue). Ivory does not take colour easily and has to be put through a process of repeated boiling and soaking in dye in order to achieve the appropriate hue. Images are incised on the coloured ivory using a technique known as keri-bori ("kick engraving"). The stained surface is scraped away to reveal the ivory underneath. Additional detail is then sometimes added in another colour, using a fine paintbrush.

The art of bachiru was largely lost until its rediscovery in the 20th century by Yoshida Fumiyuki (1915-2004). Yoshida was recognised as a Living National Treasure for his work with this art medium.
