= Jirō Kinjō =

Okinawan potter

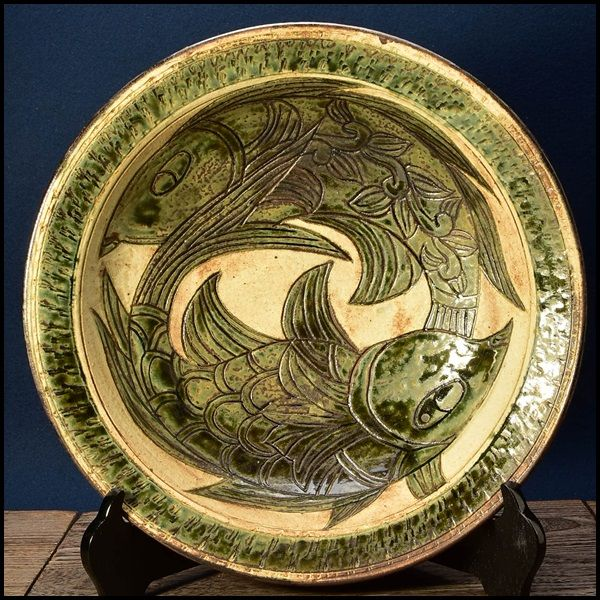
Large plate with fish motif

Jirō Kinjō (金城次郎 Kinjō Jirō, 3 December 1912–24 December 2004) was a potter born in Tsuboya, a district within the Okinawan capital of Naha, Japan. Famous for his Tsuboya ware, he is considered one of the "Three Potters of Tsuboya" (Tsuboya no sannin otoko), along with Kobashigawa Eishō and Aragaki Eisaburō.

In 1985, Kinjō became the first Okinawan to be awarded the title of Living National Treasure. He was particularly well known for his depictions of fish and crustaceans.

== Gallery ==
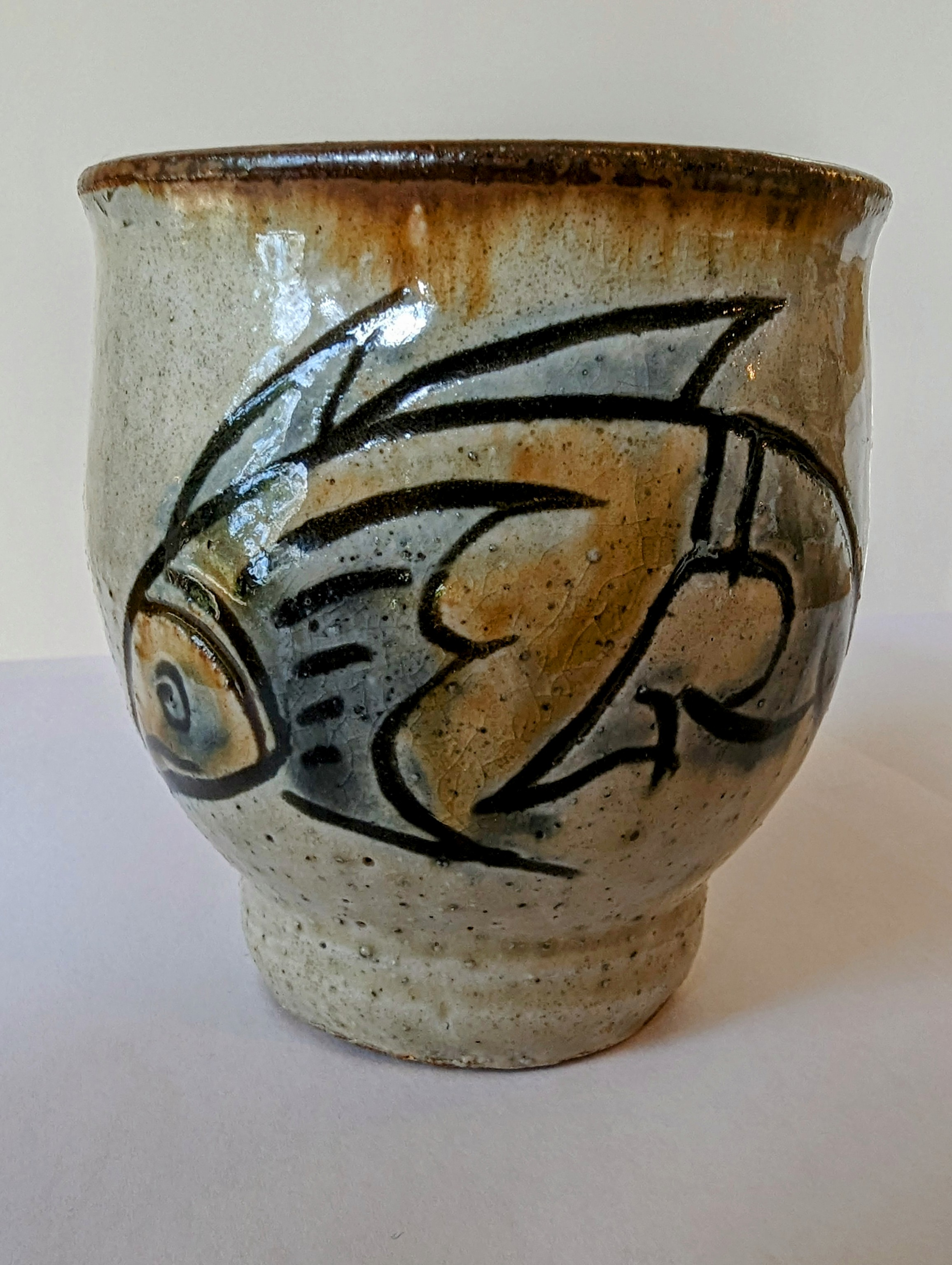
Tea cup with fish motif

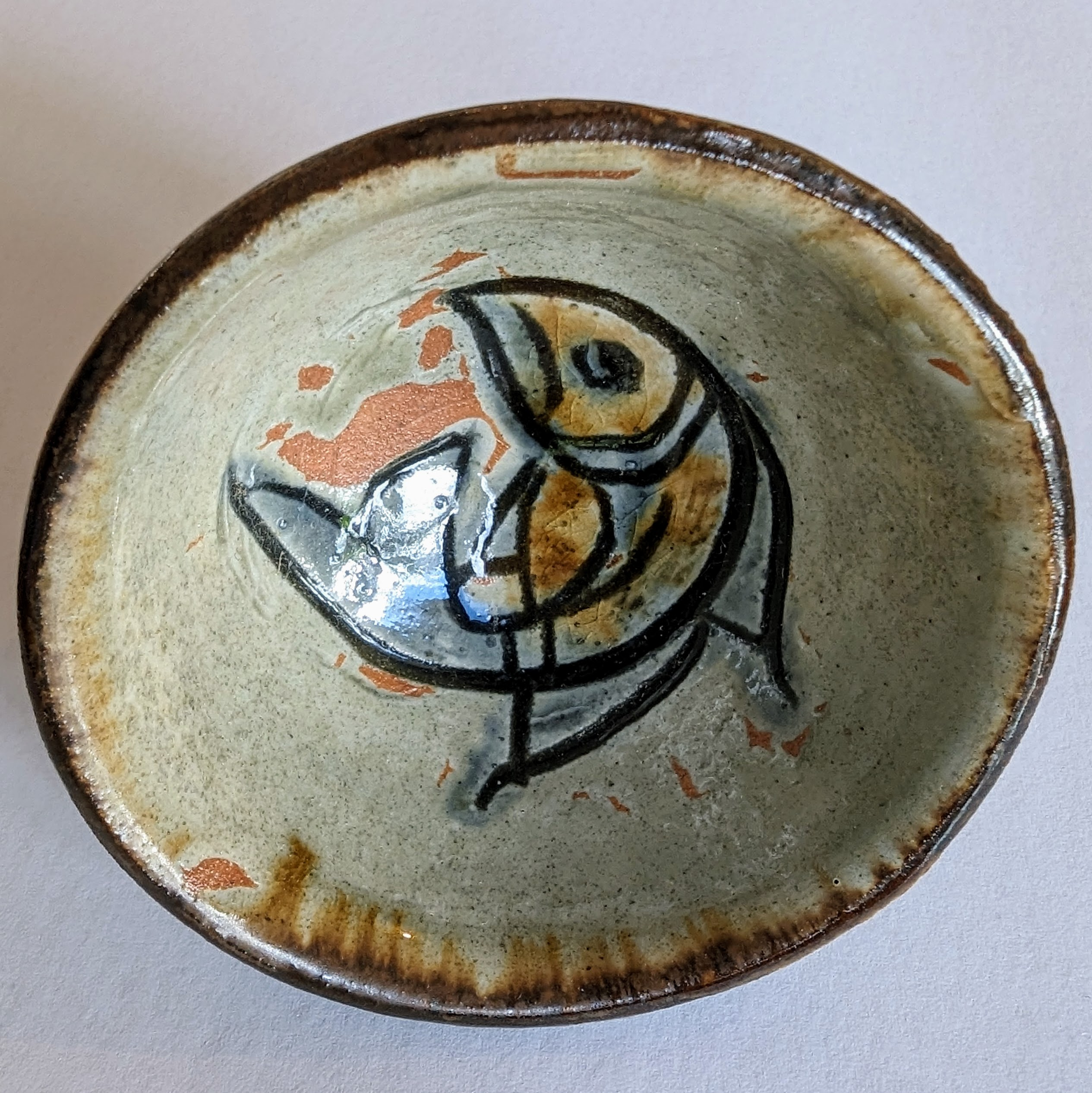
Small plate with fish motif

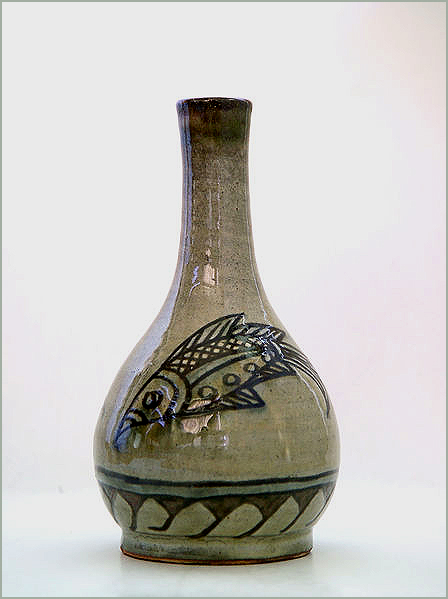
Pot with fish motif
