= Bingata =

Traditional resist-dyed fabric originating in the Ryukyuan Islands in Japan

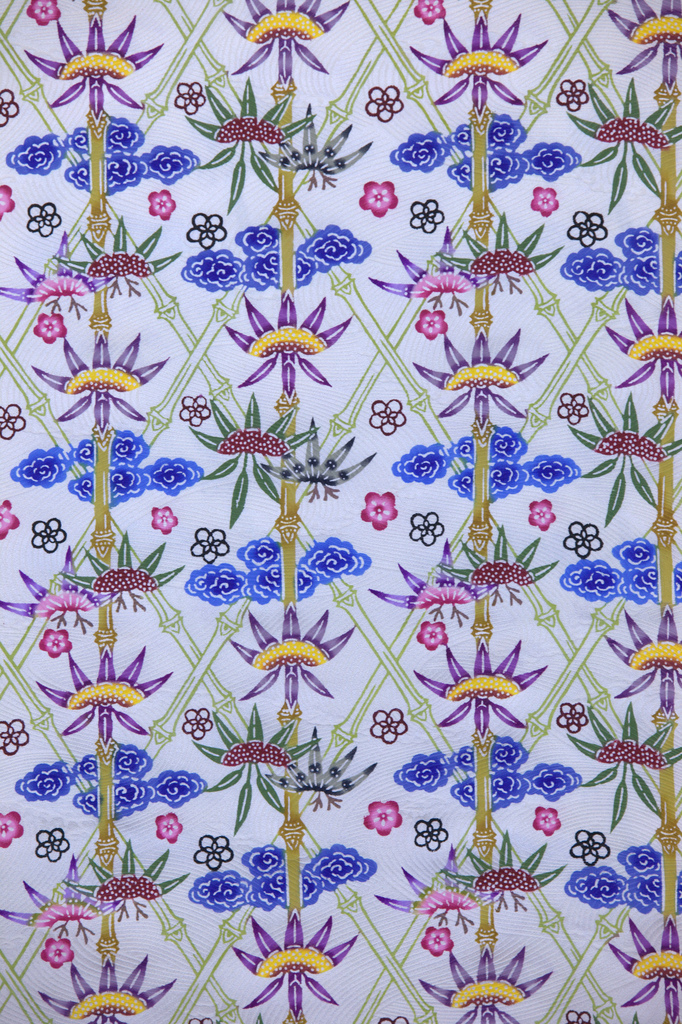
Bingata fabric

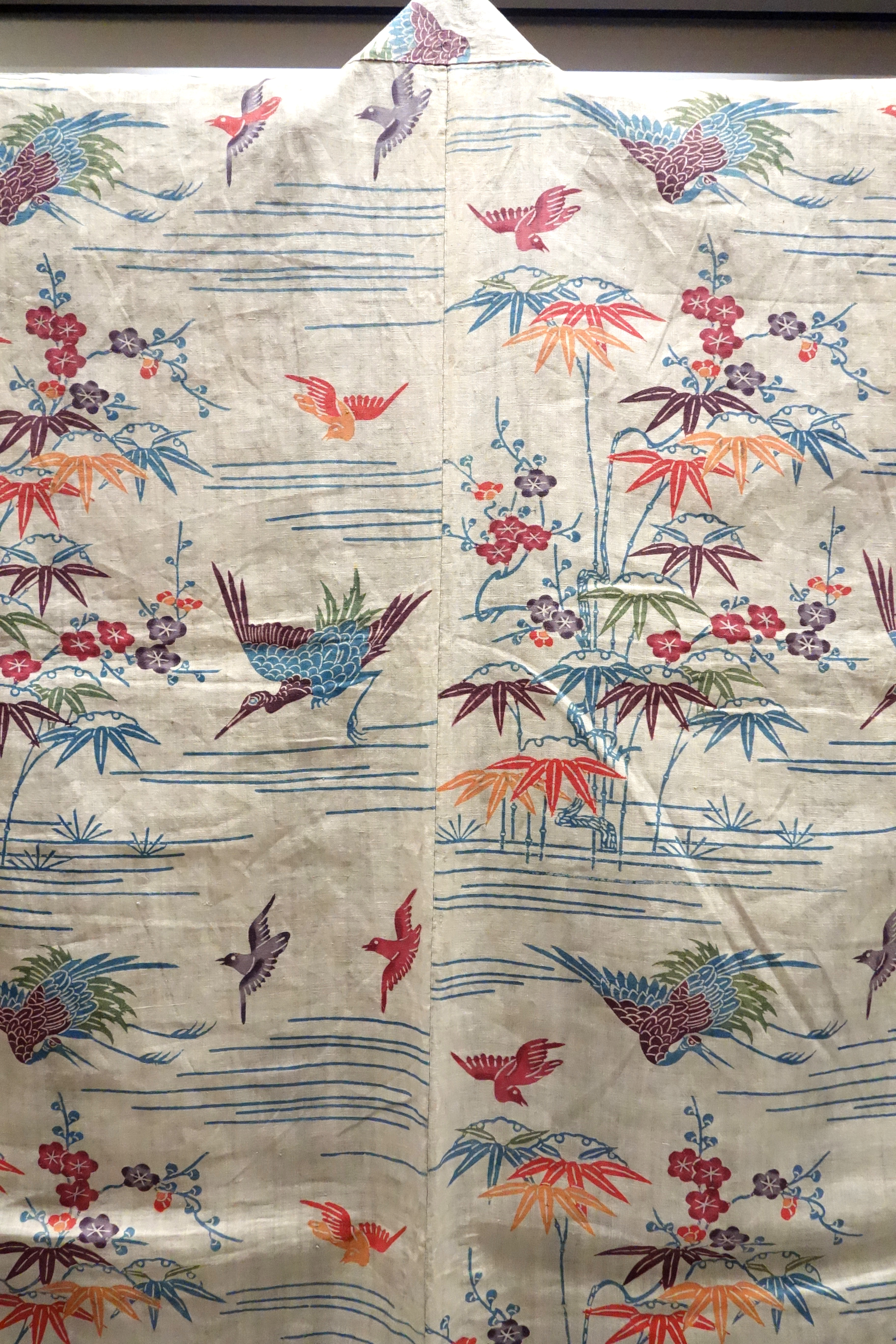
19th century ramie Ryukyuan dress showing bingata-dyed design of bamboo, cranes and plum blossoms

Bingata (Okinawan: 紅型) is a traditional stencilled resist dyeing technique originating in Okinawa Prefecture. Bingata typically features a busy pattern of repeating nature motifs such as fish, flowers and fauna in a number of bright colours. Bingata is worn during traditional Ryukyuan festivals and traditional arts performances.

Bingata dates from the Ryūkyū Kingdom period (14th century), when the island of Okinawa experienced an influx of foreign goods and manufacturing techniques. It is believed to have developed as a synthesis of Indian, Chinese, and Javanese dyeing processes.

== History ==
The techniques used in bingata are thought to have originated in Southeast Asia (possibly Java, or perhaps China or India), and arrived in the Ryukyu Kingdom through trade during the 14th century. The Ryukyu Kingdom, having a strong trade system between Korea, Japan, China and other Southeast Asian countries in the 15th and 16th centuries, utilised fabric decoration techniques originating in these countries to create an independent style of dyework featuring nature-inspired designs reflecting the Ryukyu Islands. The abundant flora and fauna gave the resulting fabric a strong natural influence, resulting in the development of the designs typically seen in bingata today.

In 1609, Japan invaded the Ryukyu Kingdom, and trade with foreign countries was prohibited. Japan demanded tribute from the Ryukyu people in the form of handicraft production, and its people were forced to produce various fabrics, including the banana fibers cloths known as jofu and kafu. In order to improve the bingata technique, the Ryukyu people invited foreign craftsmen to the island and had their own people travel abroad to master various craft techniques. The goods produced for the Japanese by the Ryukyu people were also judged by an exacting and high standard set by the royal authorities, resulting in the exported goods reaching a high level of craftsmanship that generated a strong desire for Ryukyu crafts and goods. In a report from a Chinese envoy dated 1802, the writer speaks of the beautiful bingata from Okinawa, commenting that the flowers depicted in the fabric were so vibrant that the fabric must have been produced using a "production secret that they do not reveal to others".

Pigments used in bingata were imported from Fukien and used in textile dyeing. To achieve the color white, ground chalk or powdered shells were used. Other colours were achieved using cochineal, vermilion, arsenic, and sulphur. Some patterns used up to 18 different colour applications. After the Ryukyu Kingdom came under Japanese rule, the Ryukyu people could no longer trade for these pigments, and sought new ways to continue with their painting. Production of the finer and brighter varieties of bingata had come to a halt and the workers turned to working with the materials which were readily available. Indigo was all that was left, so production for the general public became popular.

Special permission was given to only three families to produce bingata. Each family had their own designs which they passed onto future generations. There were a total of 45 dyers, the best residing in the capital of Shuri. To make the stencils, thin sheets of mulberry paper were glued together with persimmon tannin, making them thick and durable. Then they were smoked and aged, and finally the designs were drawn onto the paper and cut. Making bingata kimono was labour-intensive, and only royalty or the wealthy could afford them. The designs were held under strict control, and the distinction between classes was easily recognized by the kimono worn. Patterns for the royal household were very bold and colorful, while the general public wore simple and dark patterns of indigo or black. Only the royal family wore the yellow, while nobility wore pale blue. On special occasions, the commoners were given permission to wear certain special colors. The women in the royal family were very particular about their kimono, and forbade anyone to copy the same kimono pattern style. The patterns painted on the kimono were usually birds, flowers, rivers, and clouds on silk, linen, and bashofu (a cloth woven from musa basjoo fiber).

During the Battle of Okinawa, much was lost, and production stopped due to the destruction of the shops. After the war, a former bingata artist, Eiki Shiroma, went to mainland Japan in search of original bingata stencils which had been taken by collectors and Japanese soldiers. He found some and brought the art back to life. The U.S. occupation of Japan saw a new type of customer, and the bingata business flourished while the troops bought bingata postcards as souvenirs. Eiki Shiroma's son, Eijun Shiroma, is continuing the family tradition as the 15th generation of his family to be practicing the techniques handed down since the time bingata was produced under the patronage of the Ryukyu Kingdom. Eijun's works can still be seen today at his Shimroma Studio.

The oldest bingata piece known was found on the island of Kumejima and dates to the late 15th century. The dyes for bingata are made from plants, and include Ryukyuan ai (indigo), fukugi (a high tree in the same genus as mangosteens), suo (Caesalpinia sappan) and yamamomo (Myrica rubra), and as pigment, shoenji (cochineal), shu (cinnabar), sekio (orpiment), sumi (Indian ink) and gofun (aleurone)". In recent years, variations of the pigments have been created, and hibiscus, deigo flowers and sugar cane leaves have been used in the designs.

== Manufacturing process ==
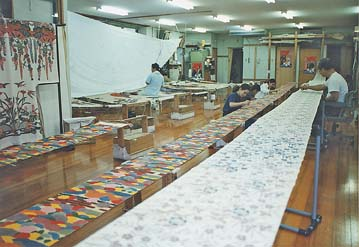
A bingata kobo, or manufacturing facility

The production of bingata is labour-intensive, with it taking three people three days to paint the material for just one kimono, and then a further month to finish it. Although bingata kimono are hard to come by, hand-made bingata T-shirts can be found for around $40 and noren curtains for around $200. A cotton bingata kimono can cost about $500 and a silk kimono $1,000.

There are ten labour-intensive steps to producing Ryukyu bingata:

1. Stencil cutting:
  Mulberry papers are coated with persimmon tannin and sealed together to form a firm sheet. A design is drawn onto the paper directly or traced from another source. The details are cut with a small blade and afterwards it is coated again to keep it from bending.
2. Stencil resist painting:
  A special rice-paste made from boiled rice, rice bran and water is scraped across the top of the stencil on the cloth.
3. Freehand resist painting:
  If a large area is needed to be painted, a freehand technique is used to apply the rice-paste resist onto the fabric. The paste is put into a bag and squeezed onto the fabric.
4. Painting:
  Prepared paints are painted onto the fabric starting from lighter to darker colours. One design can use from 9 to 18 different colours.
5. Re-painting:
  To achieve a more vibrant colour the paints are added once more and this time rubbed into the cloth with a stiff brush made out of human hair.
6. Details:
  Details around the edges of each object are added to emphasise the image. Next the fabric is steamed so the colours will set into the fabric and then it is washed.
7. Background resist:
  To paint the background a separate colour, the rice-paste resist is now placed on all the previously painted areas.
8. Background painting:
  The entire background of the fabric is painted with a wide brush or dipped in a dye bath.
9. Colour setting:
  The fabric is set in a steamer for an hour to let the colours set.
10. Washing:
  The fabric is washed and dried.

An example of bingata can be found in The Journal of Decorative and Propaganda Arts.

== See also ==
- Kimono
- Miyako Jofu
- Yaeyama Jofu
- Ryukyuan culture
- List of Traditional Crafts of Japan
