= Yaeyama Jofu =

Ramie cloth from the Yaeyama Islands, Okinawa

Yaeyama jofu (Japanese: 八重山上布; Okinawan:Husu) is a traditional Japanese textile made from the ramie plant that is produced mainly on Ishigaki Island in the Yaeyama Islands, Okinawa. Known for its lightness and breathability, the fabric features distinctive kasuri patterns and is used for summer kimono and obi.

In 2024, Sakchiko Arakaki of Ishigaki Island was officially recognized as a Living National Treasure (Holder of Important Intangible Cultural Property) for her mastery of Yaeyama Jofu weaving.

== History ==
The production of ramie cloth in the Yaeyama Islands is believed to have begun by the 15th century. Under the Ryukyu Kingdom, the cloth was presented as tribute. After the Satsuma Domain invaded the Ryukyu Islands in 1609, residents were taxed with fabric production, and head poll tax was levied in the form of handwoven cloth.

During the 18th and 19th centuries, Yaeyama jofu developed its own identity, distinct from Miyako jofu, with a focus on bold kasuri patterns. A new technique called Nassen Jofu (捺染上布) was introduced, where the dye was rubbed directly into the threads before weaving. Following the abolition of the poll tax in 1903, a weaving cooperative was established to support the craft's continuation.

== Manufacturing process ==
Yaeyama jofu is woven from fine ramie thread (choma), produced by stripping and hand-twisting the fibers from ramie stalks. Two methods of creating the kasuri patterns are used: hand-tied binding and a dyeing technique called nassen (捺染), where dye is directly applied to the threads before weaving using bamboo brushes.

The fabric is woven on simple looms, and a skilled weaver produces only a small length of fabric each day due to the fine thread and complex patterns. The finished cloth is washed and then polished by hand using wooden mallets, giving it a smooth, glossy finish.

One characteristic step in the production of Yaeyama jofu is umizarashi (海晒し), the process of bleaching the bolts of fabric in the sea after weaving. This traditional method helps to soften the fibers, remove impurities, and enhance the whiteness and luster of the material. The practice takes advantage of the strong sunlight and clean coastal waters of the Yaeyama Islands.

Unlike the production of Miyako jofu (宮古上布), where each stage is typically handled by a different specialist, most steps in the making of Yaeyama jofu (八重山上布) are carried out by a single craftsperson. This approach gives each piece a highly individual character, reflecting the maker’s skill and artistic sensibility.

== Uses ==
Yaeyama jofu is mainly used for summer kimono and obi. Its airy texture and subtle sheen make it particularly suited for hot and humid climates. Offcuts are often used to make small bags and purposes mainly as gifts.

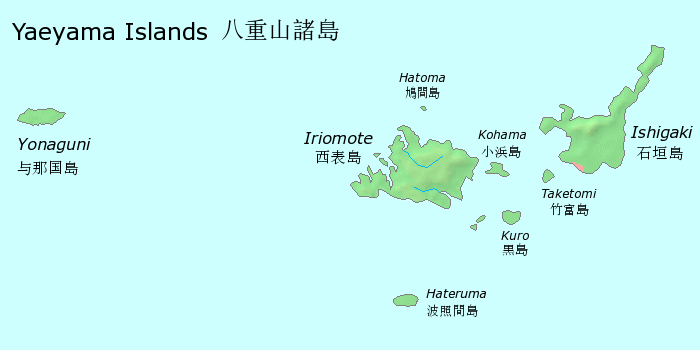

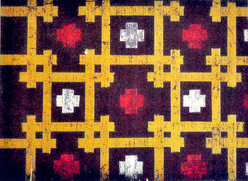

== See also ==
- Kimono
- Miyako Jofu
- Bingata
- Kuzu-fu
- Ramie
- Ryukyuan culture
- List of Traditional Crafts of Japan
