= Mirificin =

Names
- IUPAC name 8-[β-D-Apiofuranosyl-(1→6)-β-D-glucopyranosyloxy]-4′,7-dihydroxyisoflavone
- Systematic IUPAC name 8-[(2S,3R,4R,5S,6R)-6-({[(2R,3R,4R)-3,4-Dihydroxy-4-(hydroxymethyl)oxolan-2-yl]oxy}methyl)-3,4,5-trihydroxyoxan-2-yl]-7-hydroxy-3-(4-hydroxyphenyl)-4H-1-benzopyran-4-one
- Other names Daidzein 8-C-(6-apiofuranosylglucoside)

Identifiers
CAS Number	103654-50-8
3D model (JSmol)	Interactive image
ChEBI	CHEBI:85168
ChemSpider	10289943
PubChem CID	21676217
UNII	9FQ75MJ4HG
CompTox Dashboard (EPA)	DTXSID301337021
- InChI: InChI=1S/C26H28O13/c27-9-26(35)10-38-25(24(26)34)37-8-16-19(31)20(32)21(33)23(39-16)17-15(29)6-5-13-18(30)14(7-36-22(13)17)11-1-3-12(28)4-2-11/h1-7,16,19-21,23-25,27-29,31-35H,8-10H2/t16-,19-,20+,21-,23+,24+,25-,26-/m1/s1 Key: ZBXWGKPUSLRPHX-QOIVFALESA-N
- SMILES: C1[C@@]([C@H]([C@@H](O1)OC[C@@H]2[C@H]([C@@H]([C@H]([C@@H](O2)C3=C(C=CC4=C3OC=C(C4=O)C5=CC=C(C=C5)O)O)O)O)O)O)(CO)O

Properties
Chemical formula	C_{26}H_{28}O_{13}
Molar mass	548.497 g·mol^{−1}
- Except where otherwise noted, data are given for materials in their standard state (at 25 °C [77 °F], 100 kPa). Infobox references

Mirificin, also known as daidzein 8-C-(6-apiofuranosylglucoside), is an isoflavone that is found in Pueraria mirifica and Pueraria lobata. It has estrogenic activity and hence is a phytoestrogen.

== See also ==
- Daidzein
- Deoxymiroestrol
- Miroestrol
- Puerarin
- 3'-Methoxymirificin
