= Jissaku Nakamura =

Japanese activist (1867–1943)

Jissaku Nakamura (Japanese: 中村 十作; 1867–1943) was born in Joetsu, Niigata Prefecture and devoted himself to the abolition of the notorious Nintozei taxation or poll tax enforced in Miyako and Yaeyama Islands.

== Life history ==
He was born to a family of village chief on January 18, 1867. He discontinued his studies at Tokyo Senmon Gakkou (which became Waseda University later) and joined the navy. He traveled to Miyako Island in order to start a venture business of culturing pearls in 1892. There he found that the people of Miyakojima were under the torture of taxation named "Nintouzei", or poll tax by the Ryukyuan Kingdom. People between age 15 and 50 were subject to taxation; women made textiles called Miyako Jofu and men were engaged in farming. It was said that men in Miyakojima over age 50 could not work any more. Together with Seian Gusukuma, who was a technician of sugar manufacture, he started a movement which was aimed at the abolition of the poll tax. First they appealed to Okinawa Prefecture Governor Narahara Shigeru, but the taxation system had been supported by samurais who gained by this system. Finally they went up to Tokyo and appealed for the abolition of the taxation system at the National Diet together with Kama Nishiura and Moushi Taira, representatives of the farmers. On their way to the Diet, they had met various objections, upon their departure, they had met strong expectations and strong supports from Miyako people. Their movement was supported by Giichi Masuda of Yomiuri Newspapers. In 1903, the taxation system was finally abolished.

== Great Joy of Miyako People ==
- At the news of the abolition of the taxation system, people of Miyako Island were greatly excited and danced the "Pyarumizu No Kuichaa",. The original of Nintouzei Haishi No Kuicha was:
  - Bura Mausu Ugina Kara Nuburi Nyabayo (Maushi of Bora came back from Okinawa, and men in 30 villages of Miyako need not be engaged in farming, the white sand of the Port of Pyarumizu became foxtail millet and rice ) This folk dance has been the number one of Miyako people even today.

== Nakamura after the abolition of the taxation system ==
He went into the venture business of the production of cultured pearls. In 1940, the business was prohibited because of the war, and he died of gastric cancer in 1943 in Kyoto.

== The poll tax abolition movement ==
For a long time, the details of his history of the movement had not been known. Later mails showing his involvement were discovered by Shin-ichi Tanikawa and his story became apparent. In 2005, a museum was established in the neighborhood of his house.
