= Kuzu-fu =

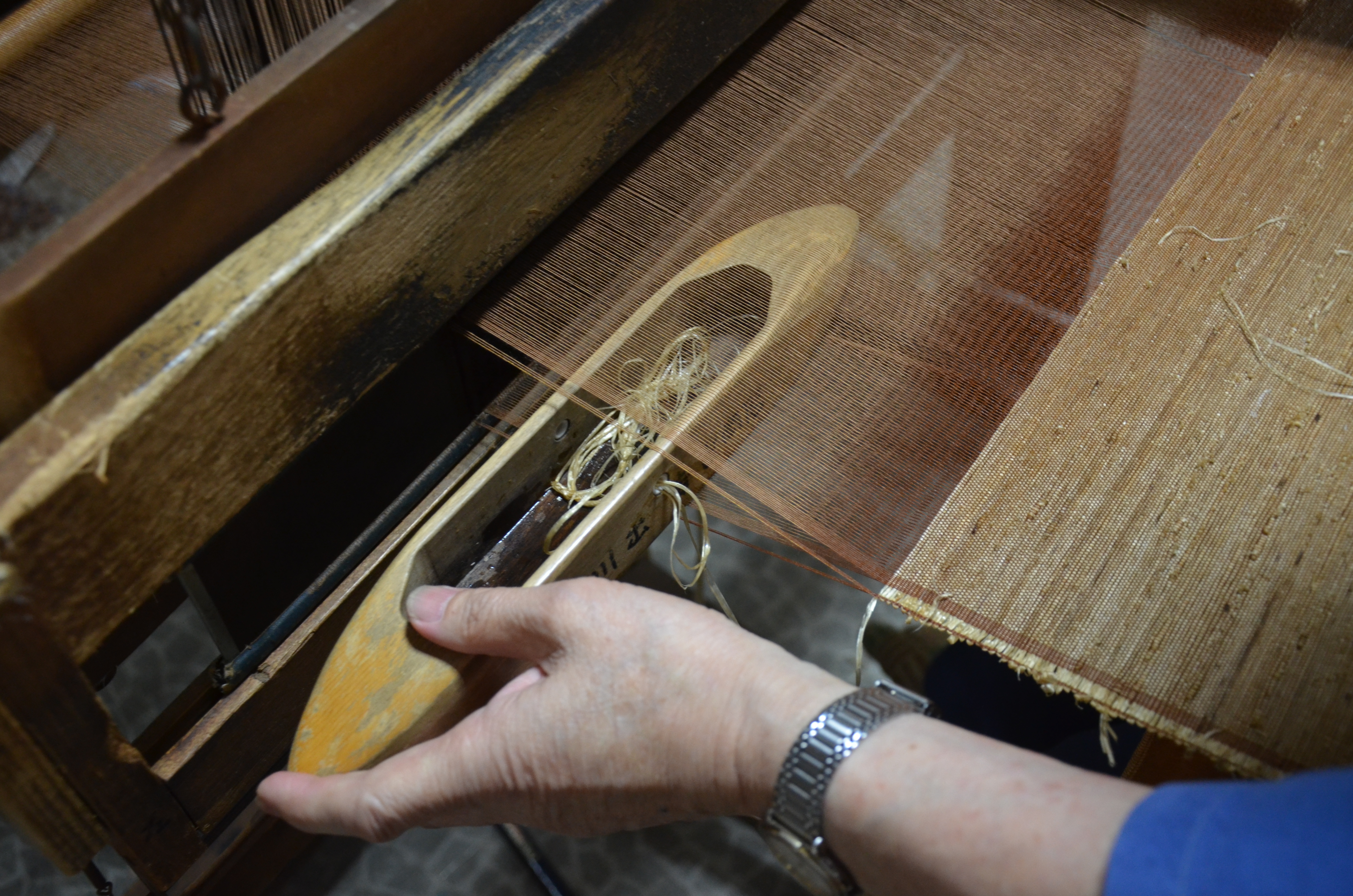
Kuzufu is woven on traditional hand looms. (at Kotakeya Kawade Kokichi Shoten in Kakegawa City, Shizuoka Prefecture, Japan on mid June, 2012)

Kuzu-fu (Japanese: 葛布) is a traditional Japanese textile made from the bast fibers of the kuzu plant (葛, Pueraria lobata, commonly known as kudzu).

== Overviews ==
It is considered one of Japan’s shizenfu (自然布), or natural-fiber textiles, alongside Bashōfu (banana fiber cloth) and Shinafu (linden fiber cloth). Kuzu-fu is prized for its earthy texture, resilience, and deep connection to Japan’s pre-modern handcrafting traditions.

== History ==
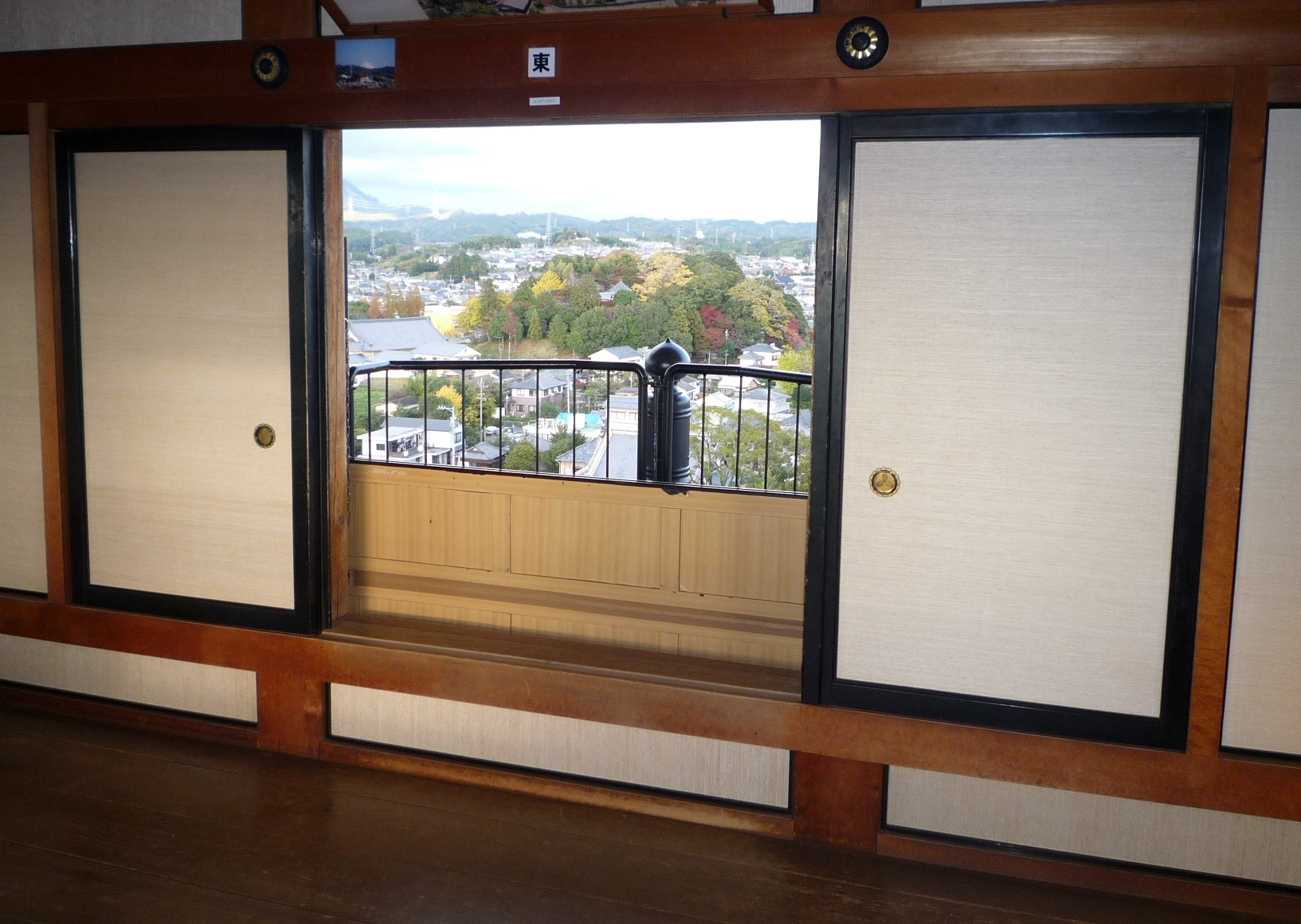
The sliding doors on the top floor of Kakegawa Castle’s reconstructed main keep are made using kuzufu (woven kudzu cloth)

The use of kuzu in textiles dates back over 1,000 years, with references in ancient Japanese texts and court records. Historically, kuzu-fu was produced in regions such as Shizuoka, Nagano, and Gifu prefectures. While it was originally worn by common people for daily garments and work-wear, over time it came to be appreciated for its unique texture and artisanal value.

During the Edo period, kuzu-fu remained in use in rural areas. However, the Meiji era's industrialization led to its near disappearance. Today, only a few craftspeople, such as the weavers of Ōigawa Kuzu-fu in Shizuoka Prefecture, continue to preserve the tradition.

== Production ==
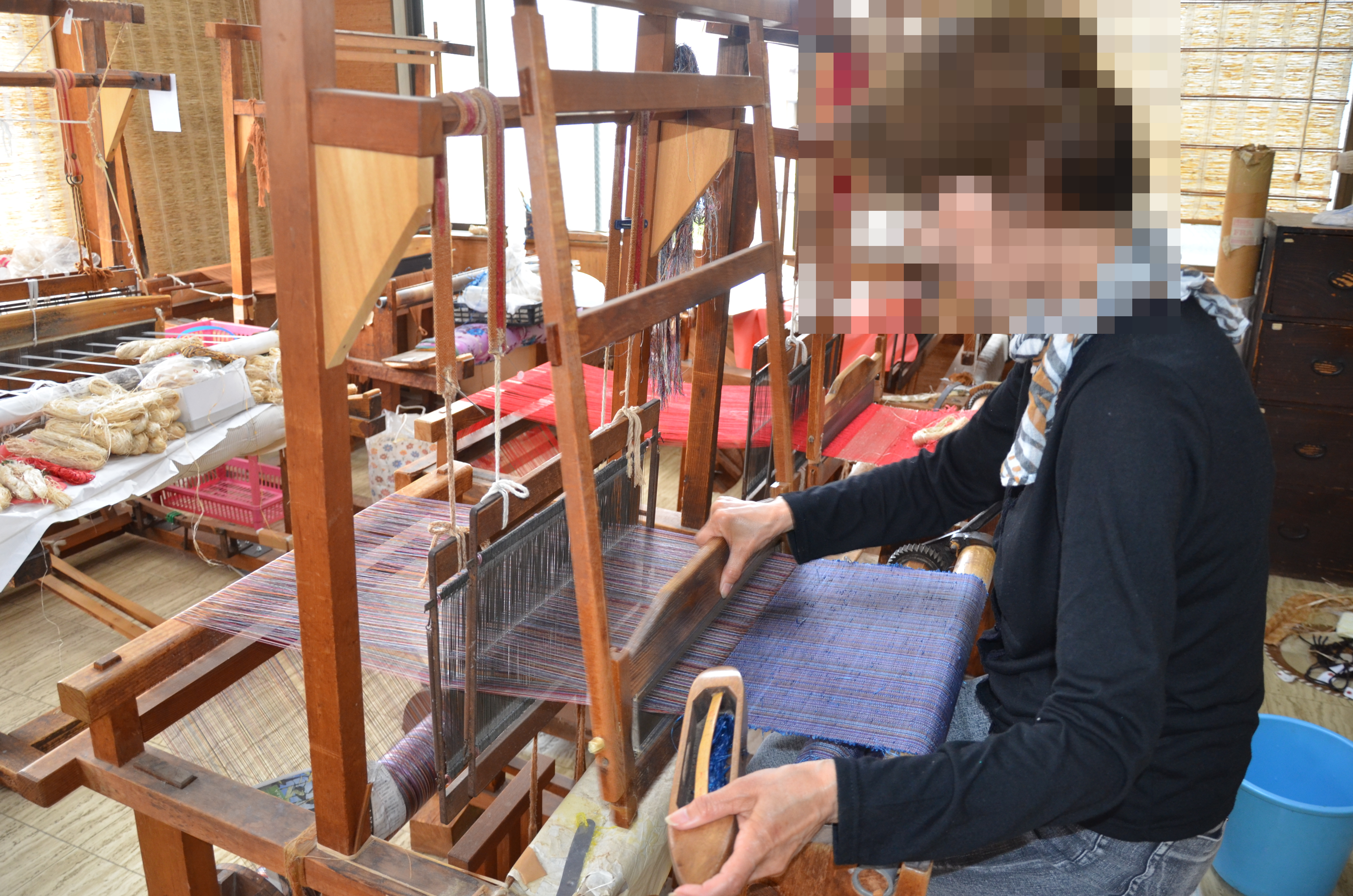
Kuzufu is woven on traditional hand looms. (at Ozaki Kappu Kogei in Kakegawa City, Shizuoka Prefecture, Japan on mid June, 2012)

L The production of kuzu-fu is labor-intensive and involves several manual processes:

1. Harvesting: Wild kudzu vines are collected in late summer or autumn.
2. Fiber extraction: The outer bark is removed to obtain bast fibers.
3. Boiling and bleaching: Fibers are softened in alkaline lye (traditionally from wood ash) and bleached in sunlight.
4. Spinning: Dried fibers are hand-twisted into thread.
5. Weaving: The thread is woven on a traditional loom, resulting in a rustic, irregular texture.

Production may take several months and yields only small amounts of cloth.

== Characteristics ==
- Texture: Crisp and textured surface.
- Colour: In its undyed state it is often an off white golden hay color.
- Breathability: Very breathable, ideal for summer wear.
- Durability: Strong and long-lasting.

== Uses ==
Kuzu-fu was traditionally used for clothing, and became popular as a wall covering in the 19th century. In modern times, it is valued for high-end kimono and obi, and mounting scrolls. Kuzu-fu is used to line the walls of Mingei-kan, the folk art museum founded by Yanagi Soetsu.

== Preservation efforts ==
Due to the complexity of its production and its reliance on wild kudzu, kuzu-fu is now a rare and endangered textile. Artisans like Murai Tatsuhiko of Ōigawa Kuzufu <ref name="kuzufu1"/> continue the craft and actively participate in exhibitions and educational programs to ensure its survival.

== See also ==
- Mingei (Japanese folk crafts)
- Japanese textiles
