= Arrowroot tea =

Beverage made by infusing arrowroot roots

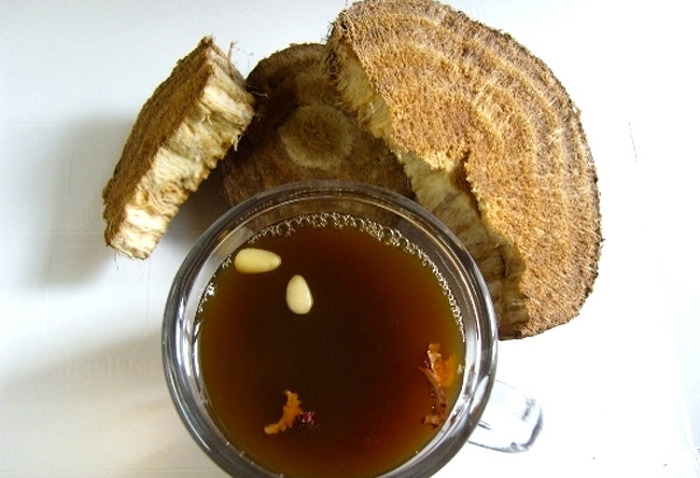
- Type: Herbal tea
- Other names: Chikcha; galbun-cha; galgeun-cha; kuzu-yu; gegen-cha
- Origin: East Asia
- Quick description: Tea made from East Asian arrowroot
- Temperature: 100 °C (212 °F)

Chinese name
- Chinese: 葛根茶
Transcriptions
Standard Mandarin
- Hanyu Pinyin: gégēn chá
Yue: Cantonese
- Jyutping: got^{3}gan^{1} caa^{4}

Korean name
- Hangul: 칡차; 갈근차; 갈분차
- Hanja: 칡茶; 葛根茶; 葛粉茶
- RR: chikcha; galgeuncha; galbuncha
- MR: ch'ikch'a; kalgŭnch'a; kalbunch'a
- IPA: tɕʰik̚.tɕʰa; kal.ɡɯn.tɕʰa; kal.bun.tɕʰa

Arrowroot tea, also called kudzu tea, is a traditional East Asian tea made from East Asian arrowroot, a type of kudzu.

== Names ==
Arrowroot tea is called gegen-cha (葛根茶) in Chinese, kuzuyu (葛湯; くずゆ) in Japanese, and chikcha (칡차), galgeun-cha (갈근차; 葛根茶), and galbun-cha (갈분차; 葛粉茶) in Korean.

== Preparation ==
=== Japan ===
Kuzuyu (葛湯) is a sweet Japanese beverage that is made by adding kudzu flour to hot water. It has a thick, honey-like texture, and a pale, translucent appearance. It is served in a mug or tea bowl. During the winter, Kuzuyu is traditionally served for dessert as a hot drink.

In Japanese, Kuzu (葛) is the word for "kudzu". It is also translated as "arrowroot", although kudzu and arrowroot are distinct plants. Yu (湯) means "hot water". In English, the name of the drink is sometimes translated as kudzu starch gruel or arrowroot tea.

In order to make Kuzuyu, Kudzu flour is added to hot water and stirred until thick. Kudzu flour, or Kuzuko (葛粉), is a powder that is made from the dried root of the kudzu plant. Kudzu flour can also be used in East Asian sauces and soups, as it is a powerful thickening agent. When added to hot water, it quickly alters the water's texture. Though lacking fragrance and taste in its powder form, kudzu takes on a unique sweet flavor when dissolved in the hot water.

=== Korea ===
Chikcha (Korean: 칡차; lit. 'arrowroot tea') can be made with either sliced East Asian arrowroot or the starch powder made from the root. Chik (칡) is the native Korean name of the plant, while cha (차; 茶) means "tea". Chikcha can also refer to the tea made from arrowroot flower. Chikcha made from powdered arrowroot is also called galbun-cha (갈분차; 葛粉茶). Galbun-cha is a Sino-Korean name for the drink, formed from gal (갈; 葛: the Korean pronunciation of the Chinese word for kudzu) and bun (분; 粉: the Korean pronunciation of the Chinese word for "flour, powder"). Conversely, chikcha made by boiling the dried roots is called galgeun-cha (갈근차; 葛根茶), with geun (근; 根) meaning "root".

The roots are harvested from late autumn to early spring. They are then washed, peeled, and sun-dried. To make tea, 15–20 g (0.53–0.71 oz) of fresh roots are simmered in 600 ml (21 imp fl oz; 20 US fl oz) of water over low heat, until the water is reduced by two thirds. Jujubes can also be boiled with the shredded roots if desired. The tea can be served hot or cold. While honey may be added to taste, sugar is not recommended.

An alternative tea can be made by ground arrowroot. First, the roots are torn into thin shreds. They are then dried for twenty days in shade, followed by ten days in a hot ondol room, after which they are ground to a starch powder. Tea is then made by mixing the starch powder with hot water. The gruel-like tea that results can also be combined with sugar, milk, green tea, or cocoa. Similar tea can also be made using starch powder from the scaly bulbs of Asian fawnlily.

Chikcha made from the arrowroot flowers can also be prepared by infusing two dried flowers, preferably picked in August, in 600 ml (21 imp fl oz; 20 US fl oz) of hot water.

== See also ==
- Cinnamon tea
- Kelp tea
- Ginger tea
- Ginseng tea
- Traditional Korean tea
- Traditional Chinese tea
- Traditional Japanese tea
