= Myrothecium verrucaria =

Scientific classification
- Domain: Eukaryota
- Kingdom: Fungi
- Division: Ascomycota
- Class: Sordariomycetes
- Order: Hypocreales
- Family: Stachybotryaceae
- Genus: Myrothecium
- Species: M. verrucaria

Binomial name
- Myrothecium verrucaria (Alb. & Schwein.) Ditmar (1813)

Synonyms
- Peziza verrucaria Alb. & Schwein. (1805); Gliocladium fimbriatum J.C.Gilman & E.V.Abbott (1927); Metarhizium glutinosum S.A.Pope (1944)

Species of fungus

Myrothecium verrucaria is a species of fungus in the order Hypocreales. A plant pathogen, it is common throughout the world, often found on materials such as paper, textiles, canvas and cotton. It is a highly potent cellulose decomposer.

It has been formulated into a biopesticide for control of nematodes and weeds. The pesticide's active ingredient is a mixture of the killed fungus, M. verrucaria, and the liquid in which the fungus was grown. The dead fungus kills specific parasitic microscopic pests called nematodes, which attack plants, usually through their roots. The active ingredient is specific, being effective only against nematodes that parasitize plants; it does not harm free-living nematodes. Because the mixture may be toxic to aquatic organisms, it is not approved for use in or near bodies of water.

Since 1998, the United States Department of Agriculture, Agricultural Research Service (ARS) has experimented with using M. verrucaria as a biologically based herbicide against kudzu vines. A spray based on M. verrucaria works under a variety of conditions (including the absence of dew), causes minimal injury to many of the other woody plants in kudzu-infested habitats, and takes effect fast enough that kudzu treated with it in the morning starts showing evidence of damage by mid-afternoon. Initial formulations of the herbicide produced toxic levels of trichothecene as a byproduct, though the ARS discovered that growing M. verrucaria in a fermenter on a liquid instead of a solid diet limited or eliminated the problem.

== See also ==
- Diacetylverrucarol
