= Puerarin =

Names
- IUPAC name 8-(β-D-Glucopyranosyl)-4′,7-dihydroxyisoflavone
- Systematic IUPAC name 7-Hydroxy-3-(4-hydroxyphenyl)-8-[(2S,3R,4R,5S,6R)-3,4,5-trihydroxy-6-(hydroxymethyl)oxan-2-yl]-4H-1-benzopyran-4-one
- Other names Daidzein-8-C-glucoside; 7,4'-Dihydroxy-8-C-glucosylisoflavone

Identifiers
CAS Number	3681-99-0
3D model (JSmol)	Interactive image; Interactive image
ChEBI	CHEBI:8633
ChEMBL	ChEMBL486386
ChemSpider	4445119
ECHA InfoCard	100.130.674
KEGG	C10524
PubChem CID	5486172
UNII	Z9W8997416
CompTox Dashboard (EPA)	DTXSID30958020
- InChI: InChI=1S/C21H20O9/c22-7-14-17(26)18(27)19(28)21(30-14)15-13(24)6-5-11-16(25)12(8-29-20(11)15)9-1-3-10(23)4-2-9/h1-6,8,14,17-19,21-24,26-28H,7H2/t14-,17-,18+,19-,21+/m1/s1 Key: HKEAFJYKMMKDOR-VPRICQMDSA-N
- SMILES: C1=CC(=CC=C1C2=COC3=C(C2=O)C=CC(=C3C4C(C(C(C(O4)CO)O)O)O)O)O; O=C2c3c(O/C=C2/c1ccc(O)cc1)c(c(O)cc3)[C@@H]4O[C@@H]([C@@H](O)[C@H](O)[C@H]4O)CO

Properties
Chemical formula	C_{21}H_{20}O_{9}
Molar mass	416.382 g·mol^{−1}
- Except where otherwise noted, data are given for materials in their standard state (at 25 °C [77 °F], 100 kPa). verify (what is ?) Infobox references

Puerarin, one of several known isoflavones, is found in a number of plants and herbs, such as the root of the kudzu plant.

Puerarin is the 8-C-glucoside of daidzein.

== List of plants that contain the chemical ==
- Pueraria lobata
- Pueraria phaseoloides
