= Diacetylverrucarol =

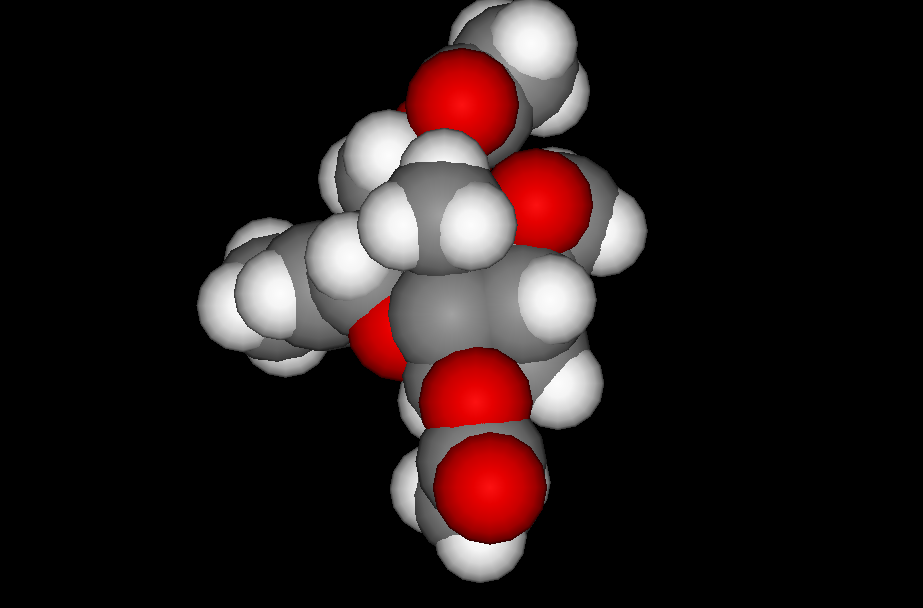

Names
- IUPAC name 12α,13-Epoxytrichothec-9-ene-4β,15-diyl diacetate
- Systematic IUPAC name (2R,2′S,4R,5S,5aR,9aR)-5a-[(Acetyloxy)methyl]-5,8-dimethyl-2,3,4,5,5a,6,7,9a-octahydrospiro[[2,5]methano[1]benzoxepine-10,2′-oxiran]-4-yl acetate
- Other names 12,13-Epoxy-trichothec-9-ene-4,15-diol diacetate; 4,15-Diacetylverrucarol; Antibiotic A 2; Di-O-acetylverrucarol

Identifiers
CAS Number	2198-94-9
3D model (JSmol)	Interactive image
ChemSpider	10216221
ECHA InfoCard	100.164.354
PubChem CID	6451372
CompTox Dashboard (EPA)	DTXSID30944569
- InChI: Key: CVJVDRZXGYXIET-YNFWZOLVSA-N; InChI=1S/C19H26O6/c1-11-5-6-18(9-22-12(2)20)15(7-11)25-16-8-14(24-13(3)21)17(18,4)19(16)10-23-19/h7,14-16H,5-6,8-10H2,1-4H3/t14-,15-,16-,17-,18-,19+/m1/s1
- SMILES: CC(=O)O[C@@H]1C[C@H]3O[C@@H]4/C=C(/C)CC[C@]4(COC(C)=O)[C@]1(C)[C@@]23CO2

Properties
Chemical formula	C_{19}H_{26}O_{6}
Molar mass	350.411 g·mol^{−1}

Hazards
- GHS labelling
Pictograms	(GHS06: Toxic) (GHS07: Exclamation mark)
Signal word	Warning
Hazard statements	H300, H310, H315, H319, H330, H335
Precautionary statements	P260, P262, P264, P270, P271, P280, P284, P301+P310, P302+P350, P302+P352, P304+P340, P305+P351+P338, P310, P312, P320, P321, P330, P332+P313, P337+P313, P361, P362, P363, P403+P233, P405, P501
- Except where otherwise noted, data are given for materials in their standard state (at 25 °C [77 °F], 100 kPa). Infobox references

Diacetylverrucarol is a natural trichothecene produced by the fungus Myrothecium verrucaria. Chemically, it is an acetate derivative of verrucarol.

Verrucarol

== Herbicide use ==
Trichothecenes have been found to cause growth retardation, wilting, chlorosis, and necrosis in some plants. It can work in poor conditions, even where there is very little or no moisture. Diacetylverrucarol is undergoing study for its successful effects at reducing or killing the kudzu weed. It is prepared through liquid fermentation of Myrothecium verrucaria mycelium after which it can be used as a pesticide. This causes very little harm to the plants that the kudzu plant displaces. Results appeared within 24 hours and the kudzu plant's roots were diseased after 14 days. In greenhouse experiments the fungus killed 100 percent of the kudzu seeds, and, in outdoor trials, 90-100 percent of older plants. The fungus is undergoing study to reduce the diacetylverrucarol presence to reduce side effects.

Because it is a trichothecene, it has significant toxicity. If swallowed by humans, the initial symptoms are general discomfort, dry eyes, and drowsiness. If a larger dose is consumed, symptoms of a hemorrhagic fever will occur, as well as mental impairment. Other animals are susceptible as well, and can experience growth retardation, reproductive disorders, and vomiting if the substance is consumed.
