= Kudzu =

Group of climbing, coiling, and trailing perennial vine

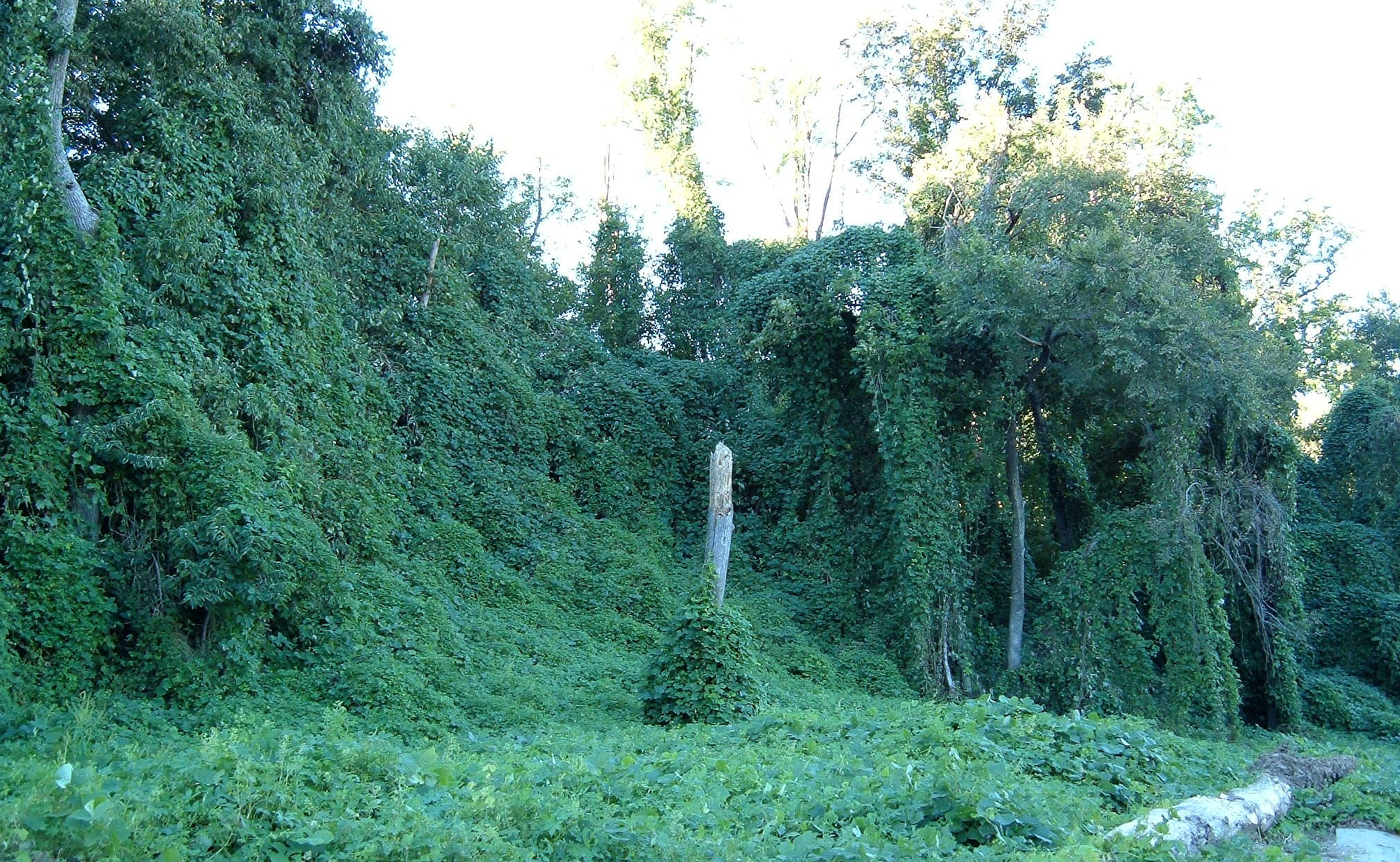
Kudzu smothering trees in Atlanta, Georgia, US

Kudzu (/ˈkuːdzu, ˈkʊd-, ˈkʌd-/), also called Japanese arrowroot or Chinese arrowroot, is a group of climbing, coiling, and trailing deciduous perennial vines native to much of East Asia, Southeast Asia, and some Pacific islands. It is invasive in many parts of the world, primarily North America.

The vine densely climbs over other plants and trees and grows so rapidly that it smothers and kills them by blocking most of the sunlight and taking root space. The plants are in the genus Pueraria, in the pea family Fabaceae, subfamily Faboideae. The name is derived from the Japanese name for the plant East Asian arrowroot, (Pueraria montana var. lobata), kuzu (クズ/葛). (Note: The Japanese character 葛 was always rendered as くず in kana (usually romanized as kuzu) and pronounced [kɯzɯ], and the English spelling kudzu comes from an old Hepburn romanization. Another word "scrap" (屑) was rendered as kudzu (くづ) and pronounced [kɯdzɯ]. Both words are now spelled くず (kuzu), and most speakers of Japanese no longer make the distinction between [zɯ] and [dzɯ] (a phonemic merger), so the two words are homonyms for them.) Where these plants are naturalized, they can be invasive and are considered noxious weeds. The plant is edible, but often sprayed with herbicides.

== Taxonomy ==
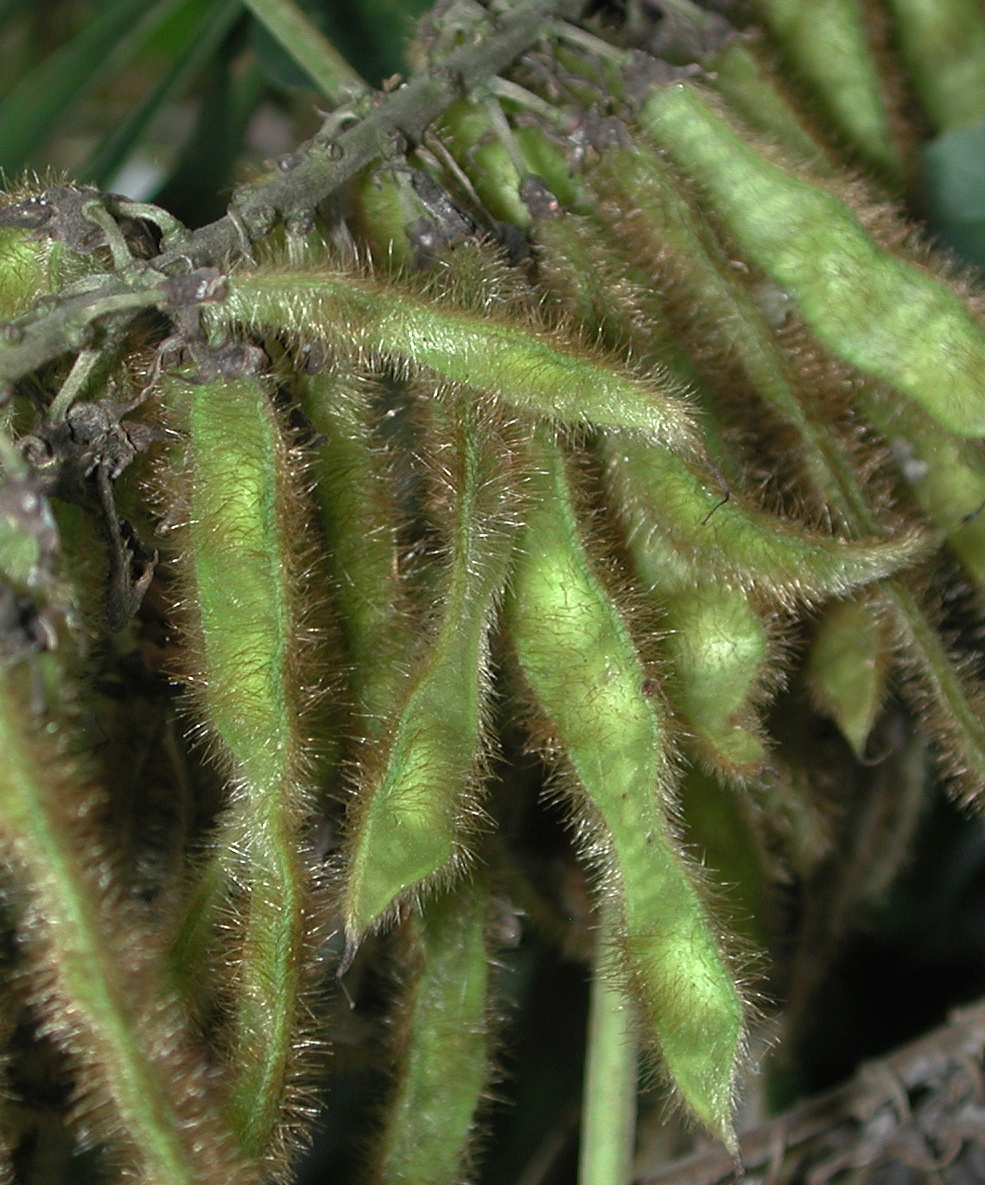
Kudzu seedpods

The name kudzu describes one or more species in the genus Pueraria that are closely related, and some of them are considered to be varieties rather than full species. The morphological differences between the subspecies of P. montana are subtle; they can breed with each other, and introduced kudzu populations in the United States apparently have ancestry from more than one of the subspecies. They are:

- P. montana
  - Pueraria montana var. chinensis (Ohwi) Sanjappa & Pradeep (= P. chinensis)
  - Pueraria montana var. lobata (Willd.) Sanjappa & Pradeep (= P. lobata)
  - Pueraria montana var. thomsonii (Benth.) Wiersema ex D.B. Ward (= P. thomsonii)
- P. edulis
- P. phaseoloides – proposed to be moved to Neustanthus

Various other species in Pueraria sensu stricto are also known as "kudzu" with an adjective, but they are not as widely cultivated or introduced.

== Ecology ==
Kudzu has been referred to as "quasi-wild" due to its long history of cultivation, selective breeding into various cultivars, and subsequent return to wild conditions. Some researchers suggest that humans are the main predator of kudzu in its native range, and that human use and cultivation of kudzu both contribute to its success as an invasive species and are a form of biological control for kudzu.

== Propagation ==
Kudzu spreads by vegetative reproduction via stolons (runners) that root at the nodes to form new plants and by rhizomes. Kudzu also spreads by seeds, which are contained in pods and mature in the autumn, although this is rare. One or two viable seeds are produced per cluster of pods. The hard-coated seeds can remain viable for several years, and can successfully germinate only when soil is persistently soggy for 5–7 days, with temperatures above 20 °C (68 °F).

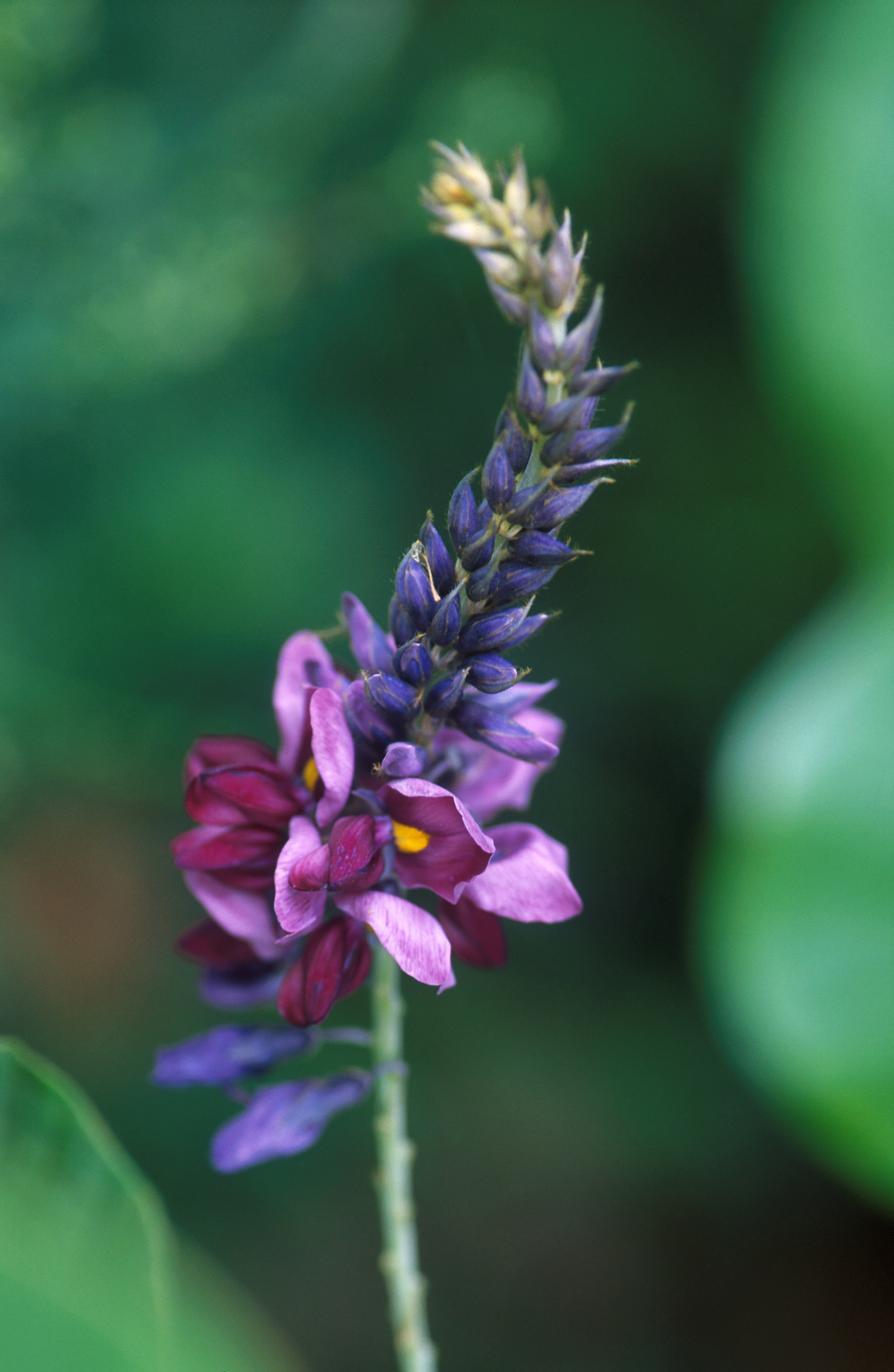
Pueraria montana flowers

Once germinated, saplings must be kept in a well-drained medium that retains high moisture. During this stage of growth, kudzu must receive as much sunlight as possible. Kudzu saplings are sensitive to mechanical disturbance and are damaged by chemical fertilizers. They do not tolerate long periods of shade or high water tables. Kudzu is able to withstand environments ranging from sunny to shady upon reaching its mature stage; however, forest edges with greater light availability are optimal.

== Invasive species ==
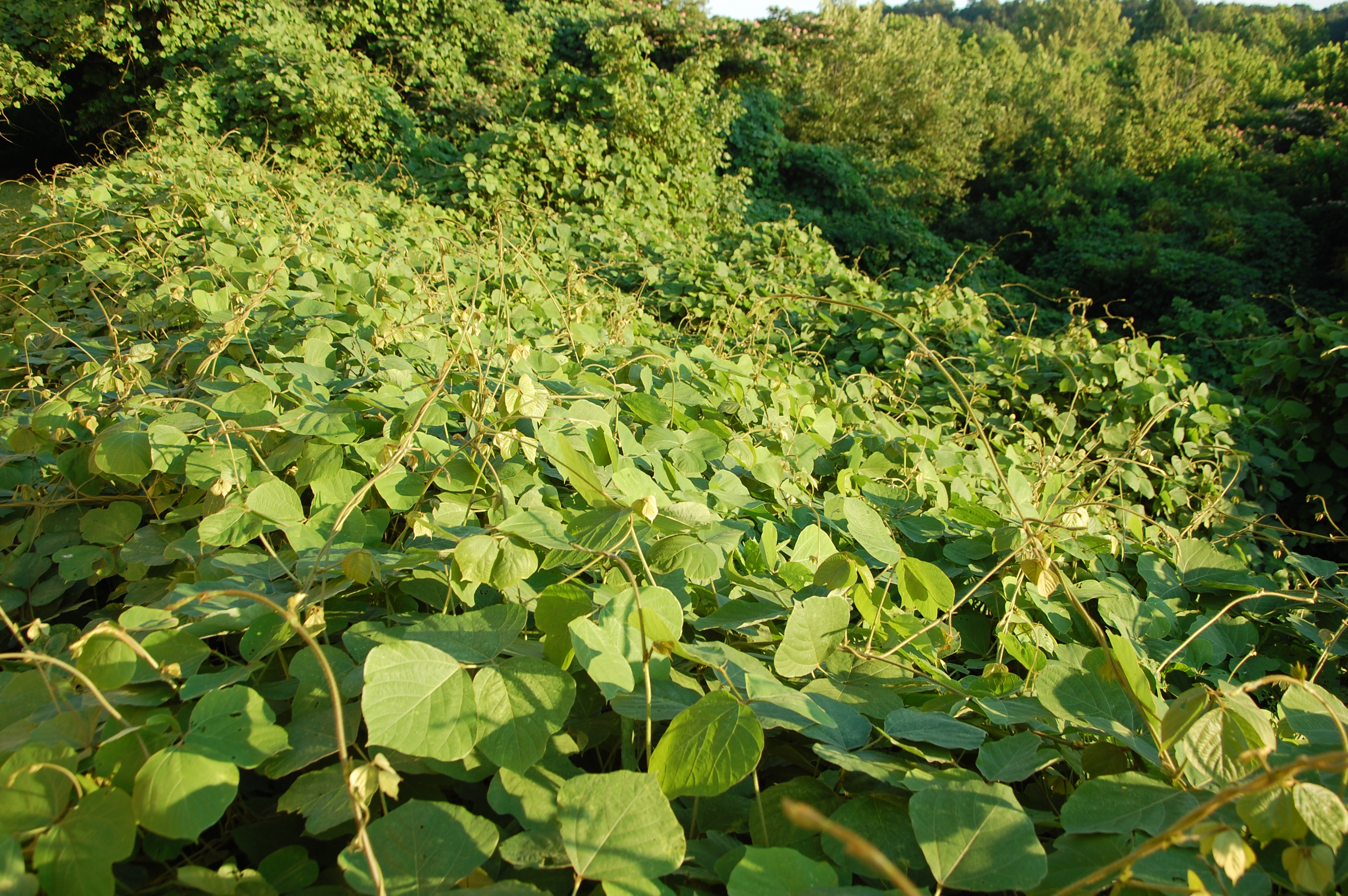
Kudzu plants near Canton, Georgia

Kudzu's environmental and ecological damage results from its outcompeting other species for a resource. Kudzu competes with native flora for light, and acts to block their access to this vital resource by growing over them and shading them with its leaves. Native plants may then die as a result.

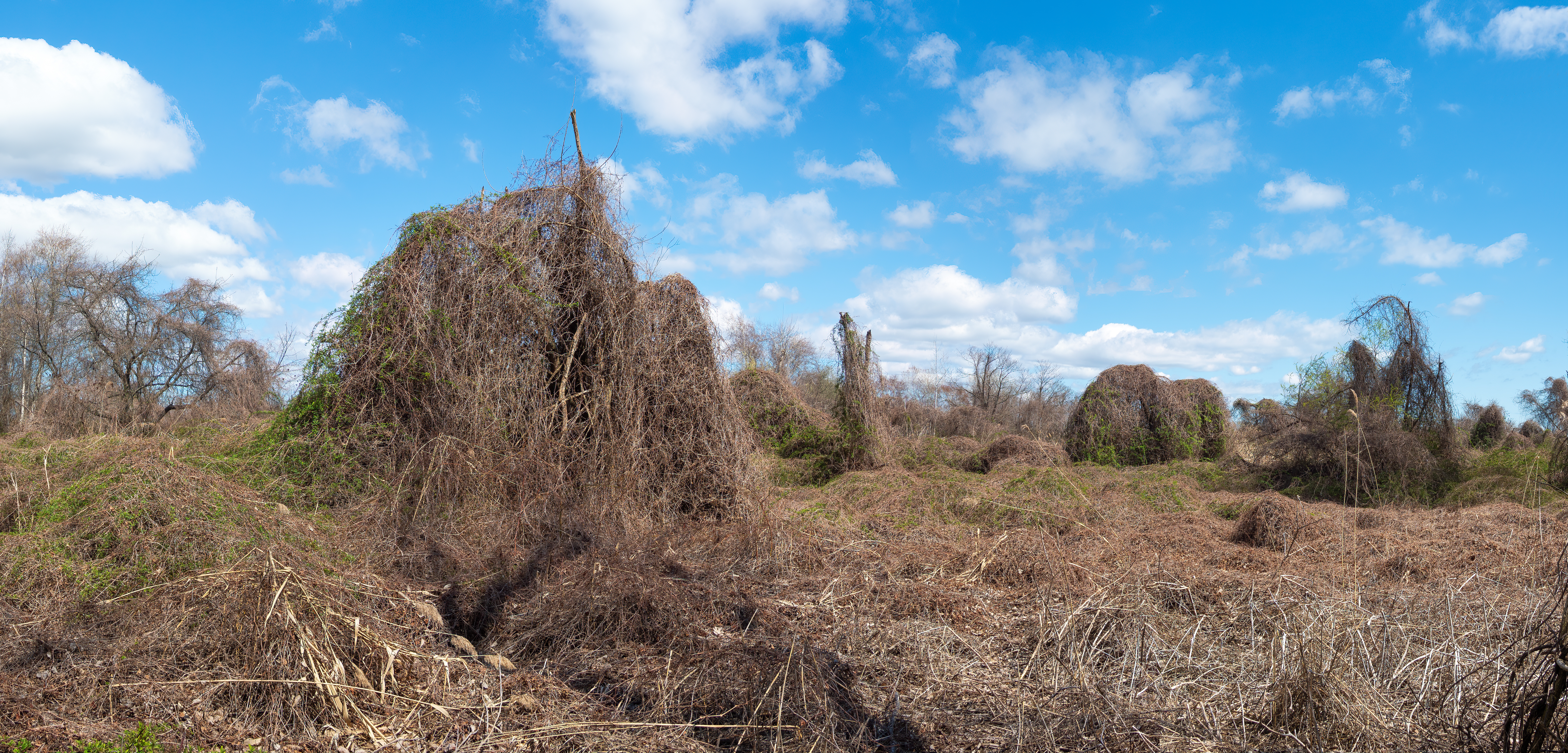
Woodland covered in kudzu in Brooklyn, NY

When kudzu invades an ecosystem, it makes the leaf litter more labile, thereby lessening the carbon sequestration ability of the soil.

=== Americas ===
Kudzu is an infamous weed in the United States, where it can be found in 32 states. It is common along roadsides and other disturbed areas throughout most of the southeast, as far north as rural areas of Pulaski County, Illinois, and along the East Coast in sparser populations as north as the New York City Metropolitan Area and Boston, Massachusetts. The vine has become a sore point in Southern US culture. Estimates of its rate of spreading differ wildly; it has been described as spreading at the rate of 150,000 acres (610 km^{2}) annually in 2009, although in 2015 the United States Forest Service estimated the rate to be only 2,500 acres (10 km^{2}) per year.

A small patch of kudzu was discovered in 2009 in Leamington, Ontario, the second-warmest growing region of Canada after south coastal British Columbia.

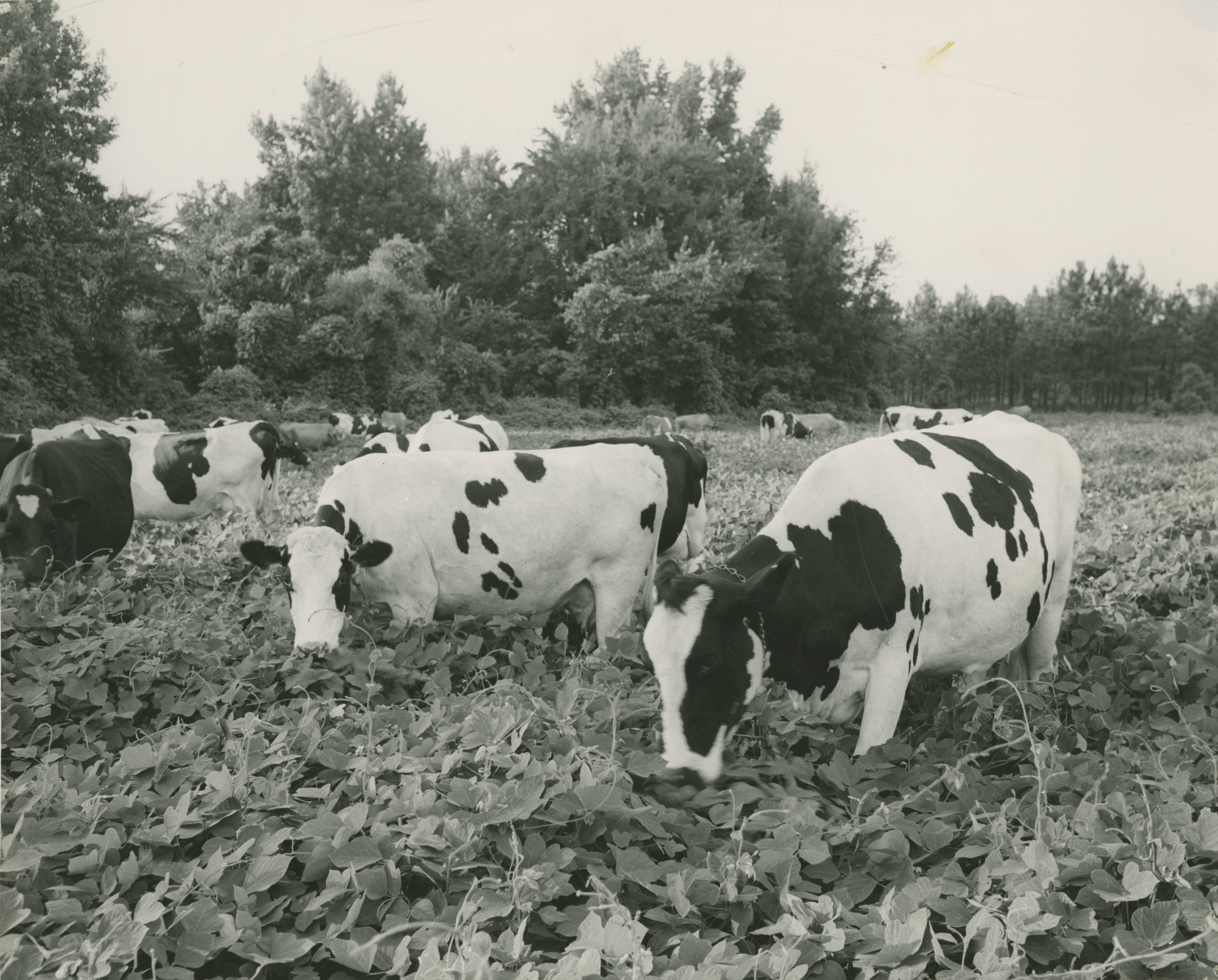
Dairy cows grazing on kudzu in Columbia County, Georgia, c. 1950s

Kudzu was introduced from Japan into the United States at the Japanese pavilion in the 1876 Centennial Exposition in Philadelphia. It was also shown at the Chicago World's Fair. It remained a garden plant until the Dust Bowl era (1930s–1940s), when the vine was marketed as a way for farmers to stop soil erosion. The new Soil Conservation Service grew seventy million kudzu seedlings and paid $8 an acre (equivalent to $184 in 2025) to anyone who would sow the vine. Road and rail builders planted kudzu to stabilize steep slopes. Farmer and journalist Channing Cope, dubbed "kudzu kid" in a 1949 Time profile, popularised it in the South as a fix for eroded soils. He started the Kudzu Club of America, which, by 1943, had 20,000 members. The club aimed to plant 8 million acres (32,000 km^{2}) across the South. Cultivation peaked at over one million acres (4,000 km^{2}) by 1945. Once Soil Conservation Service payments ended, much of the kudzu was destroyed as farmers turned the land over to more profitable uses. The Soil Conservation Service stopped promoting kudzu altogether by the 1950s.

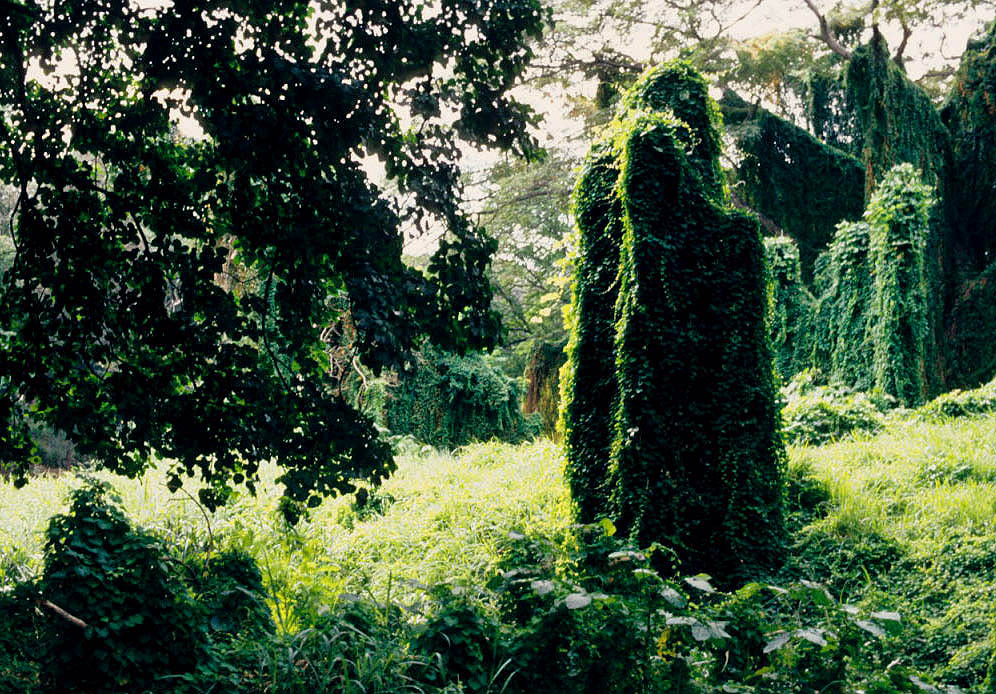
Almendares Park in Havana, 1983

Kudzu's ongoing mythos as a mile-a-minute invader is likely due to its visibility coating trees at wooded roadsides, thriving in the sunshine at the forest edge. Despite kudzu's notoriety, Asian privet and invasive roses have each proved to be greater threats in the United States.

=== Europe ===
In Europe, kudzu has been included on the list of Invasive Alien Species of Union concern (the Union list) since 2016. This means that this species cannot be imported, cultivated, transported, commercialized, planted, or intentionally released into the environment anywhere in the European Union.

There are only some kudzu populations in certain regions of Italy and Switzerland. In Switzerland it occurs almost exclusively in Ticino, where it has been found in the wild since at least 1956. Most outbreaks are concentrated around Lake Lugano and Lake Maggiore, where the climate (hot summers and mild winters) encourages its growth. However, outbreaks in peripheral areas such as the Onsernone Valley and Lower Leventina are likely due to the illegal disposal of plant waste. A plan is currently in place to reduce and eventually eradicate the kudzu population in Ticino.

=== Other regions ===
During World War II, kudzu was introduced to Vanuatu and Fiji by United States Armed Forces to serve as camouflage for equipment and has become a major weed.

In Australia, kudzu is also becoming a problem in Queensland, Northern Territory and New South Wales.

In New Zealand, kudzu was declared an "unwanted organism" and was added to the Biosecurity New Zealand register in 2002.

== Control ==
=== Crown removal ===
Destroying the full underground system, which can be extremely large and deep, is not necessary for successful long-term control of kudzu. Killing or removing the kudzu root crown and all rooting runners is sufficient. The root crown is a fibrous knob of tissue that sits on top of the roots. Crowns form from multiple vine nodes that root to the ground, and range from pea- to basketball-sized. These crowns and attached tuberous roots can weigh 400 or 500 pounds (180 to 225 kilograms) and extend up to twenty feet (six meters) into the ground. The age of the crowns is correlated to how deep they are in the ground. Nodes and crowns are the source of all kudzu vines, and roots cannot produce vines. If any portion of a root crown remains after attempted removal, the kudzu plant may still grow back.

Mechanical methods of control involve cutting off crowns from roots, usually just below ground level. This immediately kills the plant. Cutting off the above-ground vines is not sufficient for an immediate kill. Destroying all removed crown material is necessary. Buried crowns can regenerate into healthy kudzu. Transporting crowns in soil removed from a kudzu infestation is one common way that kudzu unexpectedly spreads and shows up in new locations.

Close mowing every week, regular heavy grazing for many successive years, or repeated cultivation may be effective, as this serves to deplete root reserves. If done in the spring, cutting off vines must be repeated. Regrowth appears to exhaust the plant's stored carbohydrate reserves. Harvested kudzu can be fed to livestock, burned, or composted.

In the United States, the city of Chattanooga, Tennessee, undertook a trial program in 2010 using goats and llamas to graze on the plant. Similar efforts to reduce widespread nuisance kudzu growth have also been undertaken in the cities of Winston-Salem, North Carolina, and Tallahassee, Florida. Norfolk Southern, an American railroad company, has used goats to control kudzu at its Inman Yard in Atlanta.

Prescribed burning is used on old extensive infestations to remove vegetative cover and promote seed germination for removal or treatment. While fire is not an effective way to kill kudzu, equipment, such as a skid loader, can later remove crowns and kill kudzu with minimal disturbance or erosion of soil.

=== Herbicide ===
A systemic herbicide, for example, glyphosate, triclopyr, or picloram, can be applied directly on cut stems, which is an effective means of transporting the herbicide into the kudzu's extensive root system. Herbicides can be used after other methods of control, such as mowing, grazing, or burning, which can allow for an easier application of the chemical to the weakened plants. In large-scale forestry infestations, soil-active herbicides have been shown to be highly effective.

After initial herbicidal treatment, follow-up treatments and monitoring are usually necessary, depending on how long the kudzu has been growing in an area. Up to 10 years of supervision may be needed after the initial chemical placement to make sure the plant does not return.

=== Fungi ===
Since 1998, the United States' Agricultural Research Service has experimented with using the fungus Myrothecium verrucaria as a biologically based herbicide against kudzu. A diacetylverrucarol spray based on M. verrucaria works under a variety of conditions (including the absence of dew), causes minimal injury to many of the other woody plants in kudzu-infested habitats, and takes effect quickly enough that kudzu treated with it in the morning starts showing evidence of damage by midafternoon. Initial formulations of the herbicide produced toxic levels of other trichothecenes as byproducts, though the ARS discovered that growing M. verrucaria in a fermenter on a liquid diet (instead of a solid) limited or eliminated the problem.

=== Helium ===
Helium has been used to kill kudzu in the Southern United States by drilling holes into ground infested by kudzu and saturating the soil with helium which kills the plants. Kudzu vines treated with this method exhibit 98% to 100% mortality and dies quickly without harming surrounding plants and trees. The method was discovered by Jacob Schindler, a South Georgia student.

== Uses ==
=== Soil improvement and preservation ===
Kudzu has been used as a form of erosion control and to enhance the soil. As a legume, it increases the nitrogen in the soil by a symbiotic relationship with nitrogen-fixing bacteria. Its deep taproots also transfer valuable minerals from the subsoil to the topsoil, thereby improving the topsoil. In the deforested section of the central Amazon Basin in Brazil, it has been used for improving the soil pore-space in clay latosols, thus freeing even more water for plants than in the soil prior to deforestation.

=== Animal feed ===
Kudzu can be used by grazing animals, as it is high in quality as a forage and palatable to livestock. It can be grazed until frost and even slightly after. Kudzu had been used in the southern United States specifically to feed goats on land that had limited resources. Kudzu hay typically has a 22–23% crude protein content and over 60% total digestible nutrient value. The quality of the leaves decreases as vine content increases relative to the leaf content. Kudzu also has low forage yields despite its rate of growth, yielding around two to four tons of dry matter per acre annually. It is also difficult to bale due to its vining growth and its slowness in shedding water. This makes it necessary to place kudzu hay under sheltered protection after being baled. Fresh kudzu is readily consumed by all types of grazing animals, but frequent grazing over three to four years can ruin even established stands. Thus, kudzu only serves well as a grazing crop on a temporary basis.

=== Food ===
The roots contain starch, which has traditionally been used as a food ingredient in East and Southeast Asia. In Vietnam, the starch, called bột sắn dây, is flavoured with pomelo oil and then used as a drink in the summer. In Korea, the plant root is made into chikcha (칡차; "arrowroot tea"), used in traditional medicine, and processed starch used for culinary purposes such as primary ingredient for naengmyeon (칡냉면). In Japan, the plant is known as kuzu and the starch named kuzuko. Kuzuko is used in dishes including kuzumochi, mizu manjū, and kuzuyu. It also serves as a thickener for sauces, and can be a substitute for cornstarch.

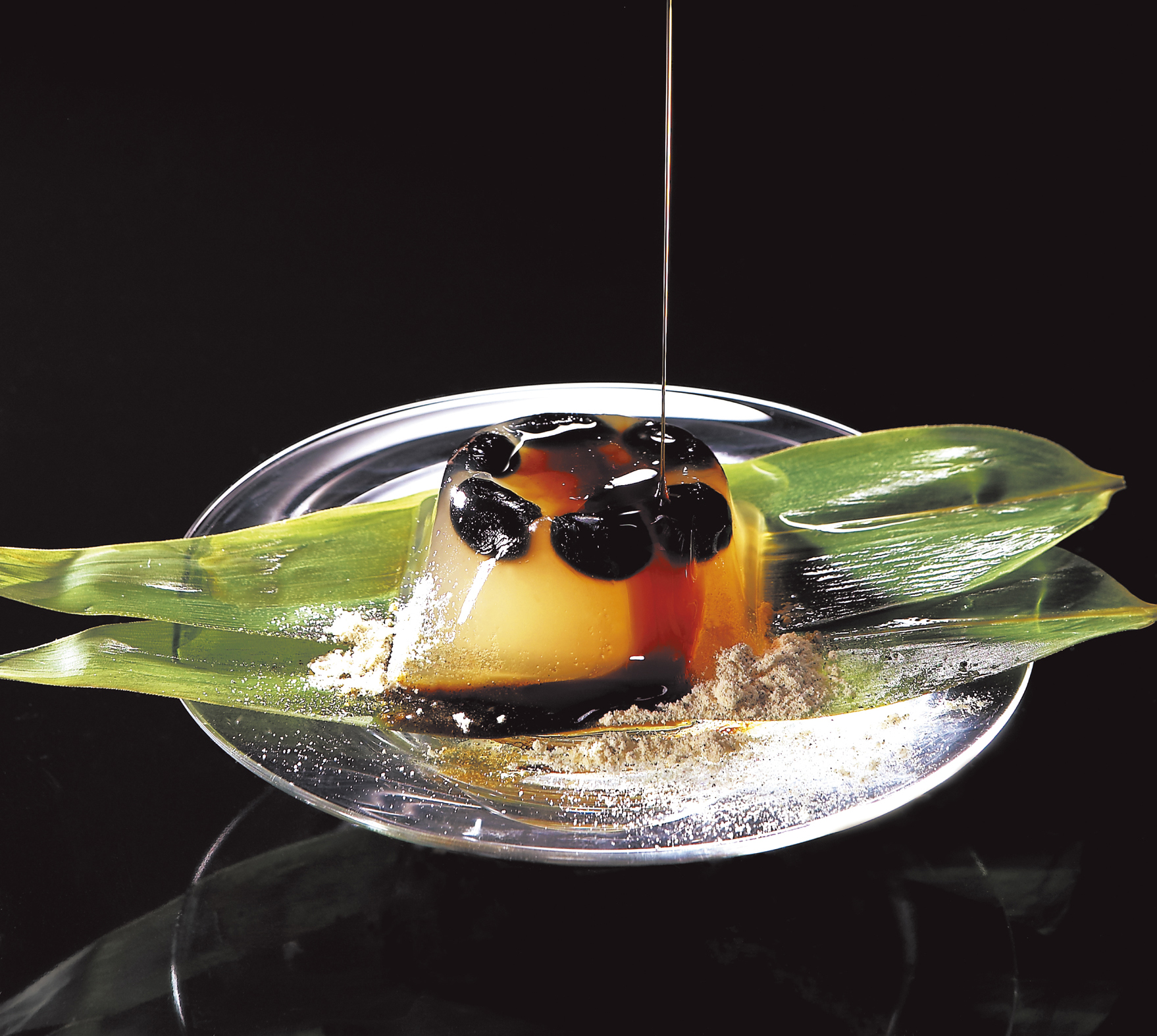
Kuzumochi, a Japanese pudding

The flowers are used to make a jelly that tastes similar to grape jelly.It's possible that nearby bee colonies may forage on a variety of blue flowers, including kudzu, during droughts as a last resort, producing a low-viscosity red or purple honey that tastes of grape jelly or bubblegum. However, research discredits the kudzu hypothesis in favor of other nectar sources, such as muscadine and sourwood.

Roots, flowers, and leaves of kudzu show antioxidant activity that suggests food uses.

=== Fiber ===
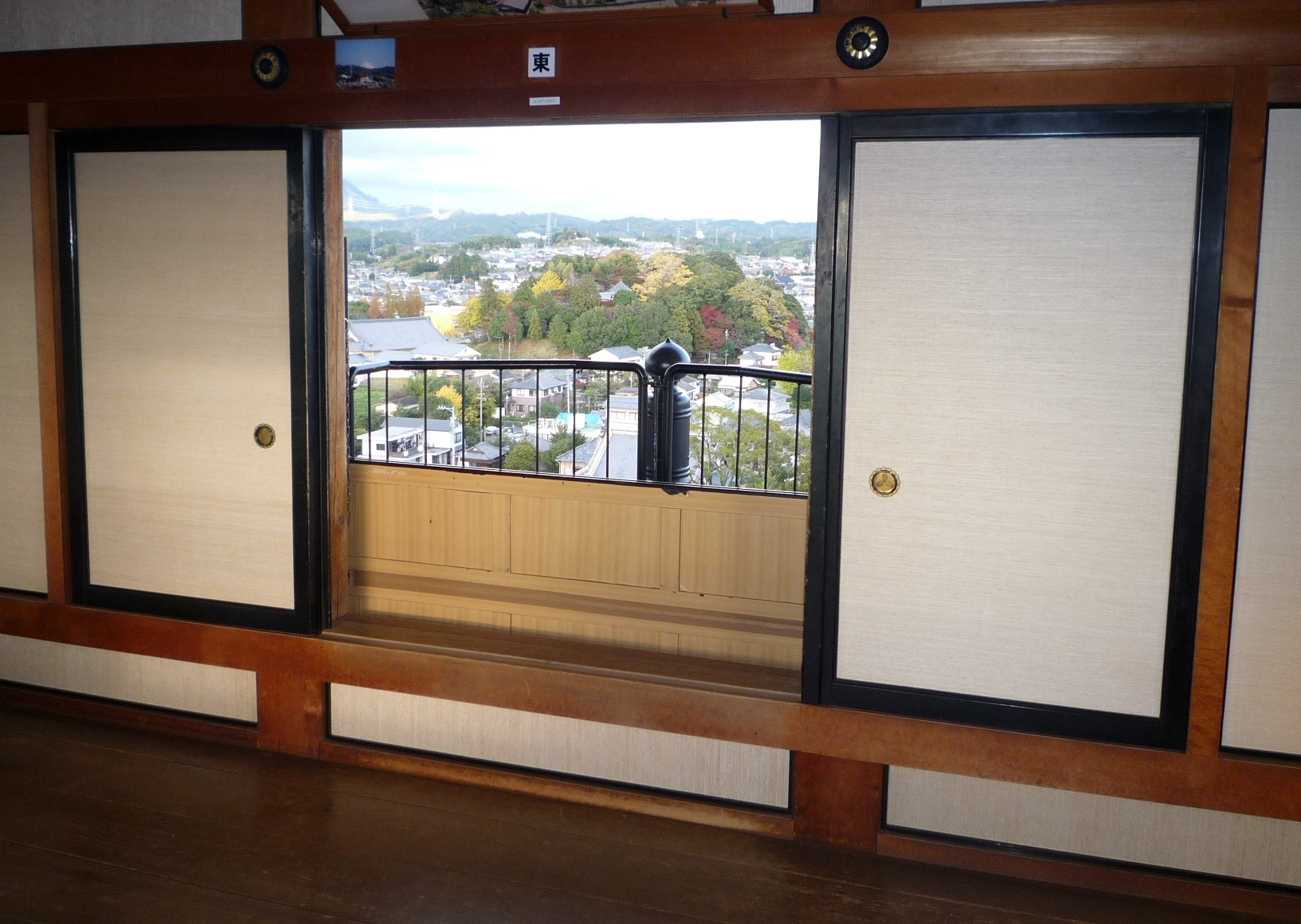
The sliding doors on the top floor of Kakegawa Castle's reconstructed main keep are made using kuzufu (woven kudzu cloth)

Kudzu fiber, known as ko-hemp, is traditionally used to make clothing and paper, and has also been investigated for industrial-scale use. Kudzu fiber is a bast fiber similar to hemp and linen and has been used for clothing in China for at least 6,000 years and in Japan for at least 1,500 years. In ancient China, kudzu was one of three main clothing and textile materials, with silk and ramie being the other two. A material made of Kudzu called Kuzu-fu is still currently used in Japan, primarily to weave kimono and obi worn in the summer.

==== Basketry ====
Kudzu fiber has long been used for fiber art and basketry. The long runners which propagate the kudzu fields and the larger vines which cover trees make excellent weaving material. Some basketmakers use the material green. Others use it after splitting it in half, allowing it to dry and then rehydrating it using hot water. Both traditional and contemporary basketry artists use kudzu.

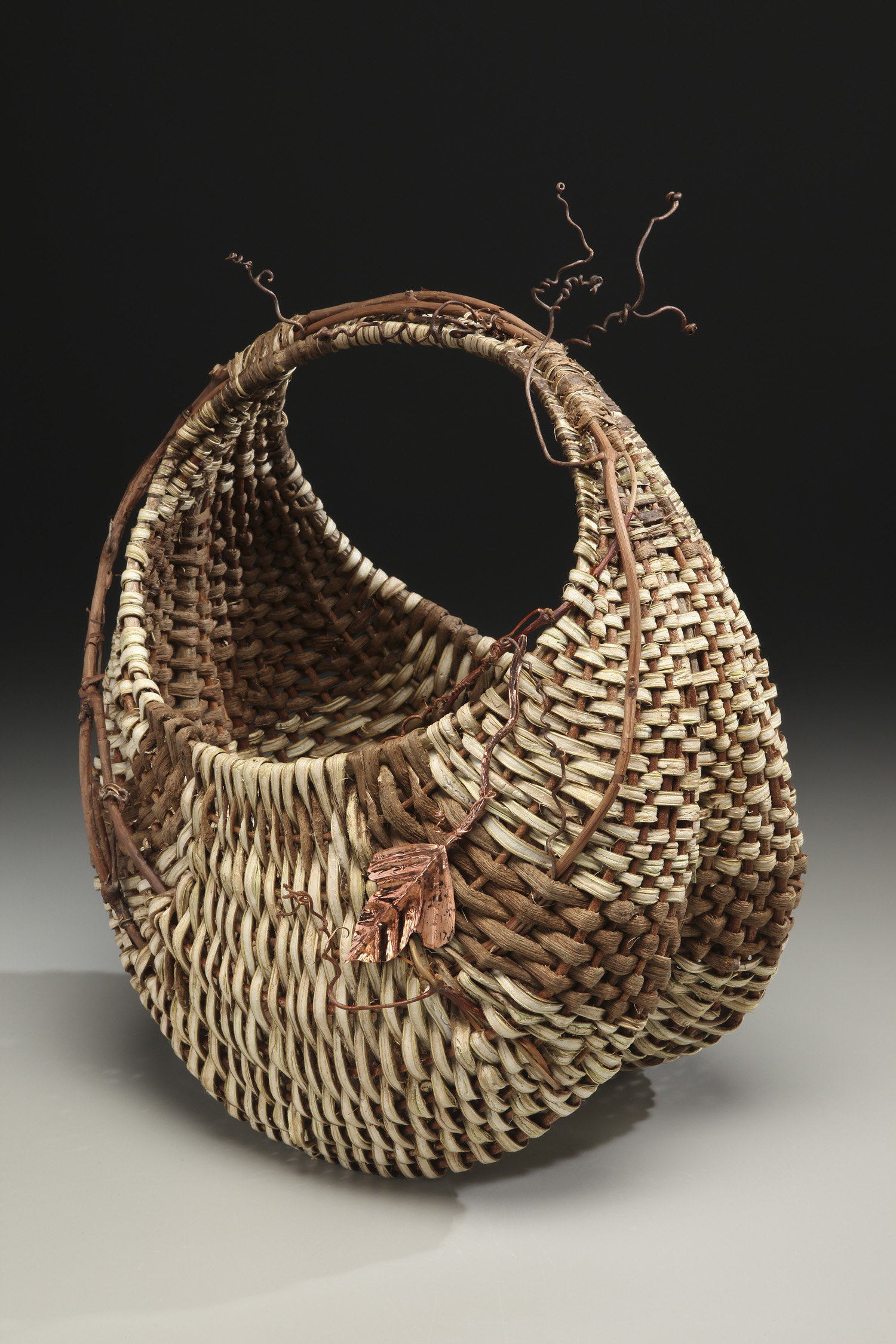
Appalachian hen basket, c. 2011

=== Phytochemicals and uses ===
Kudzu contains isoflavones, including puerarin (about 60% of the total isoflavones), daidzein, daidzin (structurally related to genistein), mirificin, and salvianolic acid, among numerous others identified. In traditional Chinese medicine, where it is known as gě gēn (gegen), kudzu is considered one of the 50 fundamental herbs thought to have therapeutic effects, although there is no high-quality clinical research to indicate it has any activity or therapeutic use in humans. Adverse effects may occur if kudzu is taken by people with hormone-sensitive cancer or those taking tamoxifen, antidiabetic medications, or methotrexate.

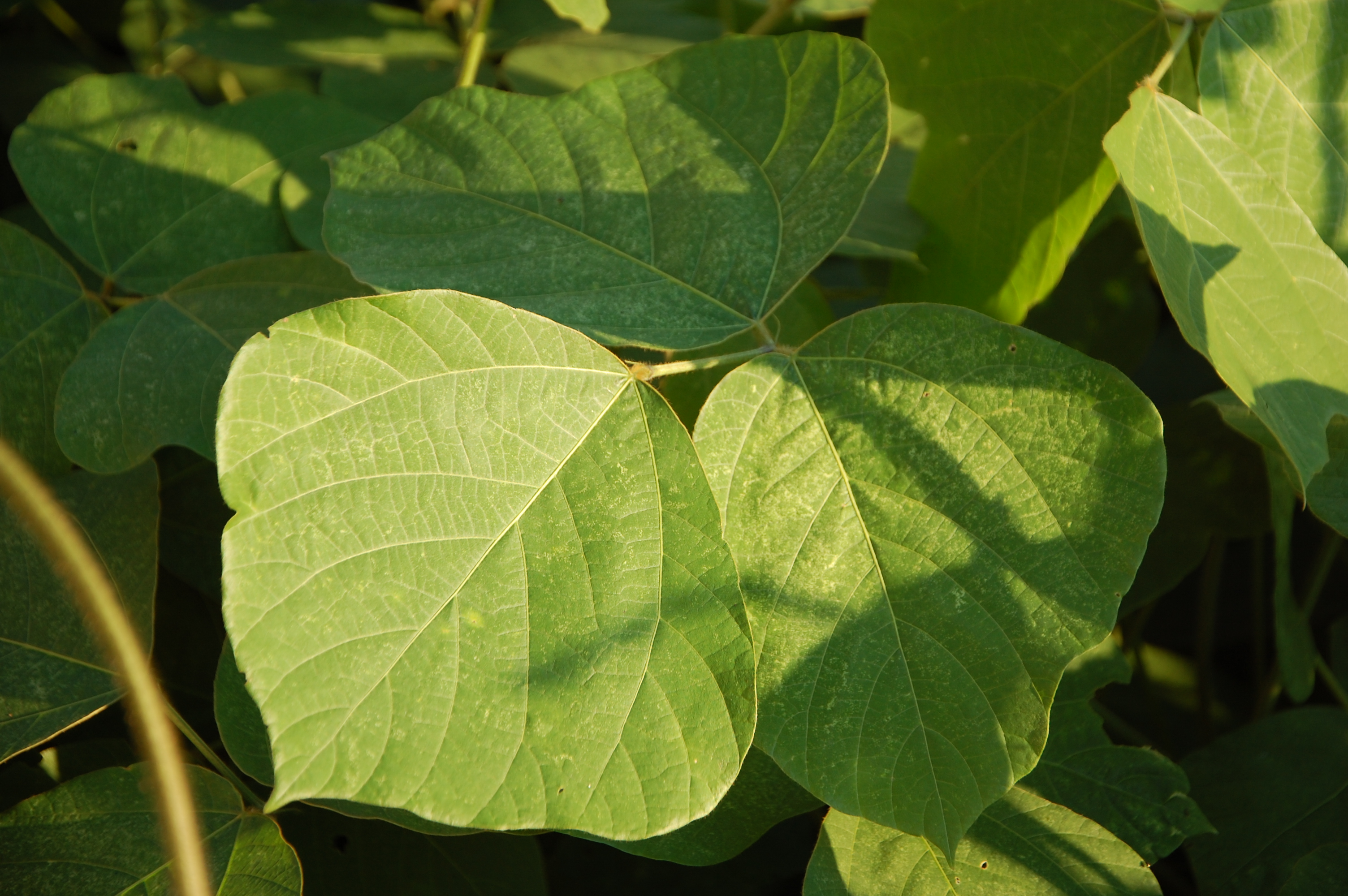
Kudzu leaves near Canton, Georgia

==== Folk medicine ====
Kudzu has also been used for centuries in East Asia in folk medicine using herbal teas and tinctures. Kudzu powder is used in Japan to make an herbal tea called kuzuyu. Kakkonto (Chinese and Japanese: 葛根湯; pinyin: gégēntāng; rōmaji: kakkontō; lit. 'Kudzu Root Soup') is a herbal drink with its origin in traditional Chinese medicine, intended for people with various mild illnesses such as headache.

=== Other uses ===
It may become a valuable asset for the production of cellulosic ethanol. In the Southern United States, kudzu is used to make soaps, lotions, and compost.

== See also ==
- Kudzu bug
- Kudzu tea
- Kudzu powder
