= Yuma Taru =

Atayal weaver

- 達陸
- Born: 1963 (age 62–63); Miaoli County, Taiwan
- Other name: Huang Ya-li
- Education: National Chung Hsing University; Fu Jen Catholic University

Yuma Taru (Chinese: 達陸; born 1963) is a Taiwanese aboriginal (Atayal) artist. She is dedicated to preserving the weaving techniques and traditional culture of the Atayal people through her art.

In recognition of her contributions, she was awarded the title of the Important Preserver of Traditional Artists in Atayal dyeing and weaving techniques.

== Biography ==
Yuma Taru was born in 1963 in Daan Tribe, Miaoli County, Taiwan. She is a descendant of the Atayal from her mother and Han ethnicity from her father. For much of her early life, she went by her Han Chinese name, Huang Ya-li (Chinese: 黃亞莉).

In 1987, she graduated from the Chinese literature department of National Chung Hsing University. Following her graduation from National Chung Hsing University, Taru became a Chinese teacher in Tung-Shin Junior High School, which was an admirable profession among people in her tribe. She devoted herself to teaching while also working at a manufacturer crafting weaving products for work-related purposes.

In 1991, at the age of 30, Taru quit her job as a Chinese teacher and returned to the Atayal community of Xiangbi in Tai'an Township, where she dedicated herself to the revival of dying Atayal traditional culture. This included the growing of plants used in Atayal weaving, such as ramie and Shoulang yam/kmages on tribal land, and the processing and dyeing of fibers. Taru was able to locate red ramie in Wufong County, Hsinchu, and successfully brought the plants back to Xiangbi. She learned weaving in part from her grandmother.

In 1998, she graduated with a master's degree with the Textile Research Institute from Fu Jen Catholic University. During her two years of graduate studies, she conducted field research by visiting more than a hundred villages belonging to eight different Atayal subtribes. She documented the life histories of tribe elders and the significant role of weaving in their lives and communities. That same year she established an Atayal Weaving Exhibition, with the goal of rediscovering and preserving her lost cultural heritage.

She has promoted tribal education, and contributed to building the Atayal Traditional Dyeing and Weaving Cultural Park.

After the 2002 Taiwan earthquake, she relocated to Tai'an Township for post-disaster reconstruction while pursuing her master's degree. During this period, she founded Lihang Studio. The studio provides women with the means to earn a living independently, especially for those without family support or stable marriage. In 2002, she became the first director of the Association of Indigenous Crafts in Miaoli and received the funding from the 1st Keep Walking sponsor project.

== Works and projects ==
In 2007–2008, her work Spreading the Wings of Dreams was sent to the National Gallery of Canada for exhibition with three other indigenous artists, Walis Labai and Kulele Rulada, on behalf of Taiwan.

Taru's 2009 work, Era of Dream Building (Chinese: 築夢時代) is 6 meters in length and 2.2 meters in height. The work, which is installed on Kaohsiung's R6 rapid transit line, depicts natural elements such as forests, land, water, sky, and breezes, using traditional Atayal weaving materials.

In 2011, some of Taru's work was shown at the fashion show titled The Heart of Forests – Atayal-styled Apparel: Weavings of Dancing Colors, held at the Xuejian Recreation Area in Shei-Pa National Park.

The Island’s Four Seasons (Chinese: 島嶼・四季), crafted in 2015, is 58 meters in length and 3.5 meters in height and made of ramie and wool. It shows the feelings and colors in the four seasons in front of visitors from abroad through the complicated weaving styles.

Her 2017 piece, L'liung Penux (Early Death of a River, 河殤), is made of ramie and wool. It was inspired by Taru's desire to see the Da'an River undergo environmental restoration.

Her 2021 piece, The Spiral of Life — The Tongue of the ClothVI (yan pala na hmali), is made of ramie, ramie and cotton yarn, steel wool, and metallic yarn. The piece depicts the concept believed by the Atayal that a person's life is “a work woven in the heavens”. The piece uses intersecting incomplete circles to symbolize the way people interact with each other and the Atayal people's welcoming attitude toward others.

=== 50-Year Atayal Culture Revival Project ===
Taru established the 50-Year Atayal Culture Revival Project (Chinese: 泰雅文化復興50年計畫) in 1991. Each of the project's five decades have their own specific goals.

From 1991 to 2001, Yuma Taru conducted fieldwork on traditional Atayal clothing weaving skills, styles, and patterns. She visited museums and institutions in Japan that house Atayal cultural artifacts and to inspect the Atayal textile collections.

In the 2000s, Taru published an essay focusing on Atayal clothing and supported the cultivation of weaving skills among tribe residents, particularly women, revitalizing the ancestral clothing traditions.

Following Taru's advocacy, P'uma Elementary School was established in Taichung in 2016. It is the first experimental elementary school for indigenous people. Additionally, she established S'uraw kindergarten to provide cultural education to children.

Taru plans to focus on "tribal sustainability, agricultural technology development, and the international promotion of Taiwan's indigenous traditions" for the decade of 2021 to 2031.

Since 2021, Taru, recognizing economic hardship within the community, has advocated a homecoming movement, promoting a self-sufficient economic system centered around the cultivation of ramie and its comprehensive utilization. She plans to begin with traditional outfits, hoping to promote Taiwan's aboriginal culture to the world and conduct international exchanges.

Her future plans include initiatives focusing on combining global perspectives with cultural activities.

== Style ==
Taru has devoted herself to restoring the Atayal people's traditional dyeing and weaving techniques through research, investigation, and analysis. She has produce range of pieces, including various crafts and traditional Atayal clothes. For the Atayal people, weaving represents a cultural record of the weaver's life and creations. The circle of life is a significant concept, which involves coming into the world through a symbolic “rainbow bridge” or “bridge of the gods,” and returning to the ancestral land. Through traditional weaving, she combines the memories of ethnic groups with contemporary culture, arousing awareness of the preservation and conservation of cultural heritage.

Her works use ramie threads cultivated, processed, and dyed in her own workshop. She combines them with natural materials. Using techniques like weaving, knitting, embroidery, and wrapping, she creates installations with balanced linear patterns, proportions, and a low-saturation, earthy color palette. In recent years, Taru has attempted to introduce innovations to Atayal weaving culture.

== Exhibitions ==
=== Taipei Fashion Week AW23 ===
At Taipei Fashion Week AW23, Yuma Taru used LED fiber-optic threads to create a weaving and dyeing effect, combined with Atayal traditional hand weaving and natural dyeing skills. In the Taipei fashion week AW23, she collaborated with Taiwanese fashion brand Chia-hung Su (Chinese: 蘇家紘), exploring the continuity and extension of aboriginal culture from the migration of Austronesian people to the Japanese colonial period. They also incorporated traditional Taiwanese Aboriginal and Japanese craftsmanship, wabi-sabi aesthetics, and modern fashion silhouettes. At the event, the show opened with a set of traditional Atayal wedding dresses from the collection of the National Museum of Prehistory, followed by this clothing series depicting the timeline of Taiwanese Aboriginal culture.

=== First Wave: Contemporary Australian and Taiwanese Indigenous Fashion Exhibition 2022 ===
This exhibition was held in Taiwan and Australia between 2022 and 2023, presenting the first aboriginal ethnic groups under the colonial experience of Taiwan and Australian colonization and combining it with the contemporary element as the innovation. This mirrored the mainstream culture and fashion industry, continuously connected the land, ethnic groups and their contemporary identity, and offered fashion propositions. She borrowed the idea of “the First Nation”, regarding aboriginal people on the island, redefining the identity of indigenous people.

She collaborated with the Australian artist Lyn-AI Young and brought the message that fashion was not limited to the shape, color, and quality, it also implies the designers’ thoughts and reflection to the world.

=== Return to the Wilderness: Exhibition of Aboriginal Art 2023 ===
This show explored the irreversible fading of tribal scenes between tradition and contemporary times. Five artists were invited to return to tribal life after living away from their hometowns for years. These artists from diverse backgrounds looked back on their life journeys.

=== Tracing and Drifting ===
Yuma Taru presented hand-woven artworks created over a span of thirty years. The exhibition comprised three main sections, including works that result from her research and analysis, the present circumstances of indigenous people in central Taiwan, a journey through the rich fields of wild lilies along the Da'an River in their memories.

== Awards ==
In 2006, Yuma Taru was declared a National Living Treasure by the Bureau of Cultural Heritage, Ministry of Culture (CCA, Council for Cultural Affairs) and also named The Important Traditional Craft Preserver in the weaving category by the Ministry of Culture for her effort to preserve traditional Atayal weaving culture and her skills of weaving.

- 2007-2008 Most Outstanding and Best Local Engagement in Public Art Work
- 2015 Outstanding Alumni in Social Service and Catholic Spirit Promotion from Fu Jen Catholic University
- 2021 Environment Integration in Public Art Work
