= Kuzu =

The Kuzu (国栖・国巣・国樔) were a people of ancient Japan believed to have lived along the Yoshino River in Nara Prefecture. They were mentioned in the Kojiki and Nihon Shoki. The name was also used for a population living in the old Hitachi province (today's Ibaraki Prefecture) mentioned by the Hitachi Fudoki.

Their name may be at the origin of the name of the kudzu plant, supposedly for being associated with the harvest and sale of kudzu roots or starch extracted from them.
