= Ramie =

Type of vegetable fibre

Ramie (from Malay rami) is a fibre crop native to eastern Asia, derived from the plant Boehmeria nivea.

A second type, known as green ramie or rhea, is believed to have originated in the Malay Peninsula. It has smaller leaves which are green on the underside, and it appears to be better suited to tropical conditions. The word "ramie" is derived from the Malay word rami.

== Cultivation ==
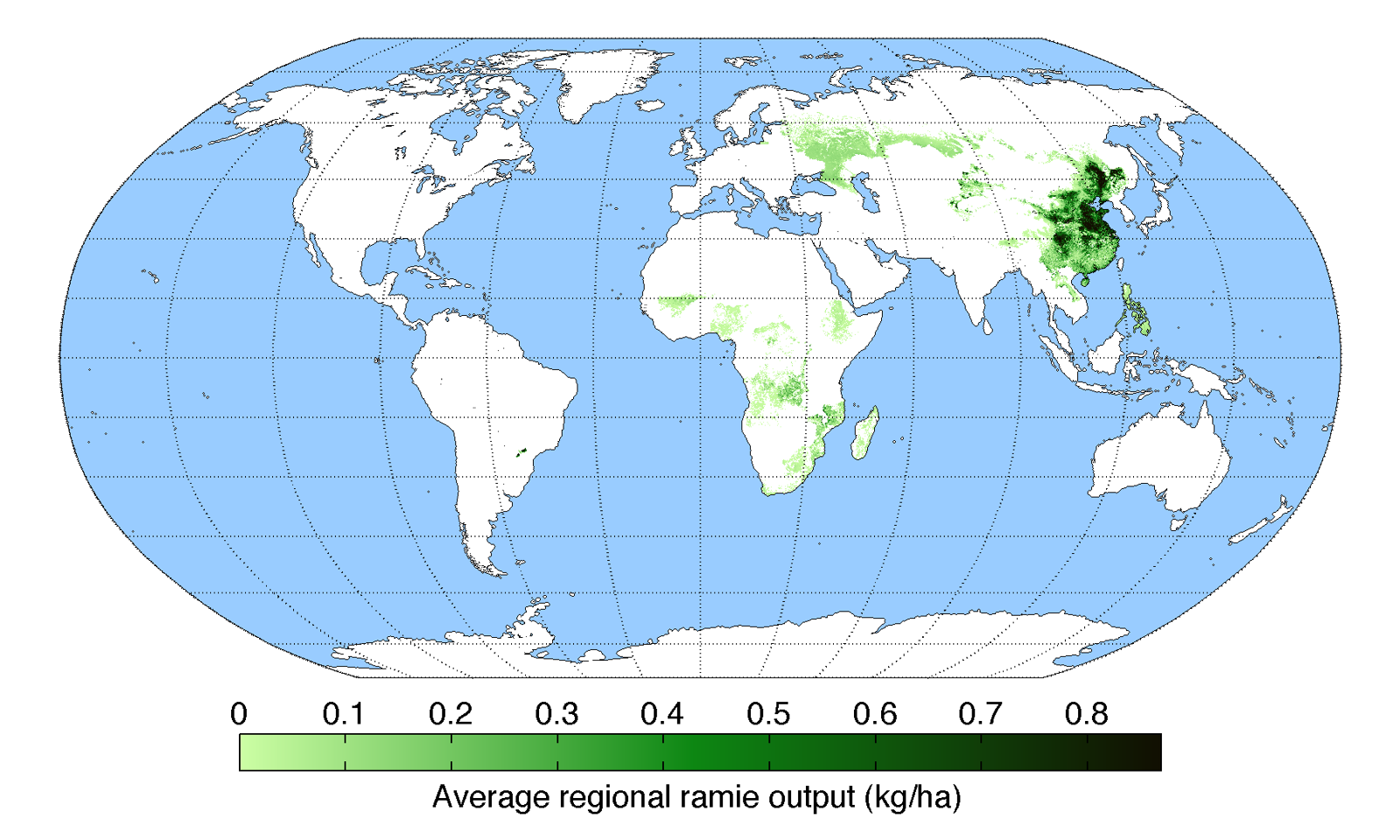
Worldwide ramie production

Ramie is one of the oldest fibre crops, having been used for at least 6,000 years, and is principally used for fabric production. It is a bast fibre, which comes from the inner bark (phloem) of the vegetative stalks and not the woody stem itself or the outer bark. Ramie is normally harvested two to three times a year, but under good growing conditions can be harvested up to six times per year. Unlike other bast crops, ramie requires chemical processing to de-gum the fibre.

When the plant begins flowering, or just before, it signals both a decline in growth and the plant being at its maximum fibre content, and is harvested. Stems are harvested by cutting just above the lateral roots or by bending the stem. This enables the core to be broken and the cortex can be stripped from the plant in situ.

After harvesting, stems are decorticated while the plants are fresh. If this is not done while the plants are still fresh, the plants dry out and the bark will be difficult to remove. The bark ribbon is then dried as quickly as possible, preventing bacteria and fungi from attacking it.

The dry weight of harvested stem from crops ranges from 3.4 to 4.5 t/ha/year. A 4.5-ton crop yields 1,600 kg/ha/year of dry undegummed fibre. The weight loss during degumming can be up to 25%, giving a yield of degummed fibre of about 1,200 kg/ha/year.

The fibre extraction occurs in three stages. First, the cortex (bark) is removed; this can be done manually or by machine. This process is called decortication. Second, the cortex is scraped to remove most of the outer bark, the parenchyma in the bast layer and some of the gums and pectins. Third, the residual cortex material is washed, dried, and degummed to extract the spinnable fibre.

== History ==
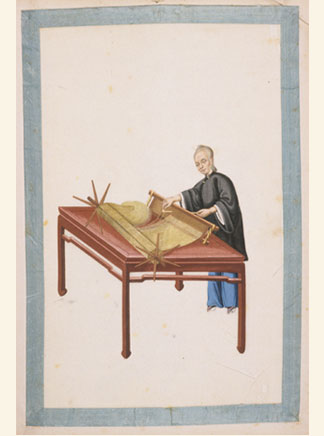
Preparing ramie fibre for weaving, The Story of Ramie From Seed to Finished Garment, c. 1820

Ramie has been grown in China for many centuries, and farmers in ancient China are known to have used the fibre to weave clothing. In China, it is called zhu ma (Chinese: 苎麻; pinyin: zhù má). It may have been used in cloth for wrapping mummies in Egypt. Though ramie and flax are difficult to distinguish from one another in ancient cloth, ramie's resistance to bacteria and mildew would make it appropriate for mummy wrapping.

Taiwan's aboriginal people have used ramie for millennia in fabric production and ramie is still used to create traditional garb by crafters such as Yuma Taru.

Ramie was used to produce an open-weave fabric called mechera, used for shirts and dressing gowns suitable for warm climates. The French painter Raoul Dufy designed in the early 20th century patterns for prints on mechera used by the French shirtmaker Charvet.

Brazil began production in the late 1930s with production peaking in 1971. Since then, production has steadily declined as a result of competition from alternative crops, such as soybeans, and from synthetic fibres.

== Properties ==
Ramie is one of the strongest natural fibres. It exhibits even greater strength when wet. Ramie fibre is known especially for its ability to hold shape, reduce wrinkling, and introduce a silky lustre to the fabric appearance. It is not as durable as other fibres, so is usually used as a blend with other fibres such as cotton or wool. It is similar to linen in absorbency, density, and microscopic appearance. It does not dye as well as cotton. Because of its high molecular crystallinity, ramie is stiff and brittle and will break if folded repeatedly in the same place; it lacks resiliency and is low in elasticity and elongation potential.

Physical and chemical properties of ramie fibre
| Cellulose (wt%) | Lignin (wt%) | Hemicellulose (wt%) | Pectin (wt%) | Wax (wt%) | Microfibrillar angle (°) | Moisture content (wt%) | Density (g/cm^{3}) |
|---|---|---|---|---|---|---|---|
| 68.6 – 76.2 | 0.6 – 0.7 | 13.1 – 16.7 | 1.9 | 0.3 | 7.5 | 8.0 | 1.50 |

Mechanical properties of untreated ramie fibres
| Fibre diameter (mm) | Fracture load (N) | Tensile strength (MPa) | Fracture strain (%) |
|---|---|---|---|
| 0.034 | 0.467 | 560 | 0.025 |

== Uses ==
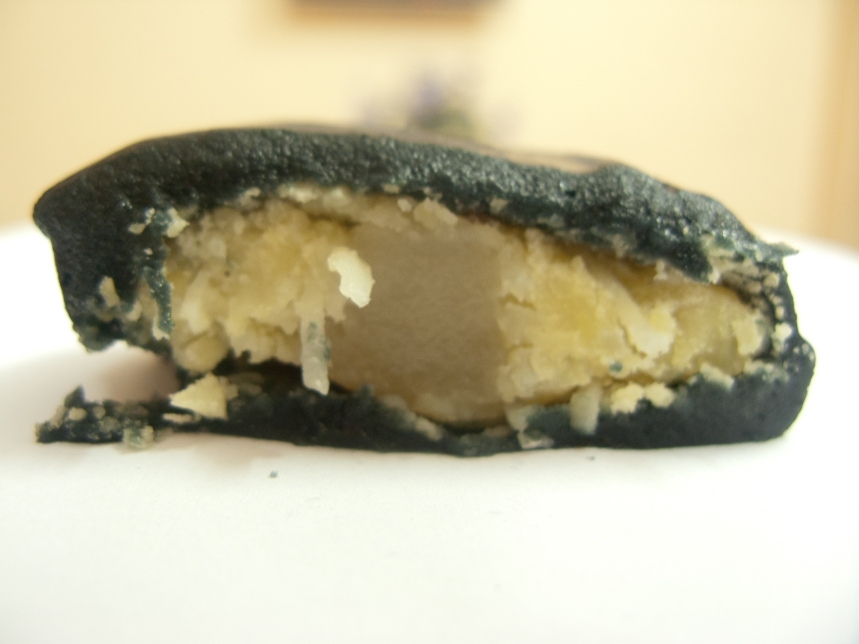
Vietnamese glutinous rice cake, Bánh gai. Ramie leaf extract gives the outer layer its dark green colour. Because of its resemblance to this outer layer of Vietnamese rice cake, the caramelized ripe fig candy was called "Ramie Fig".

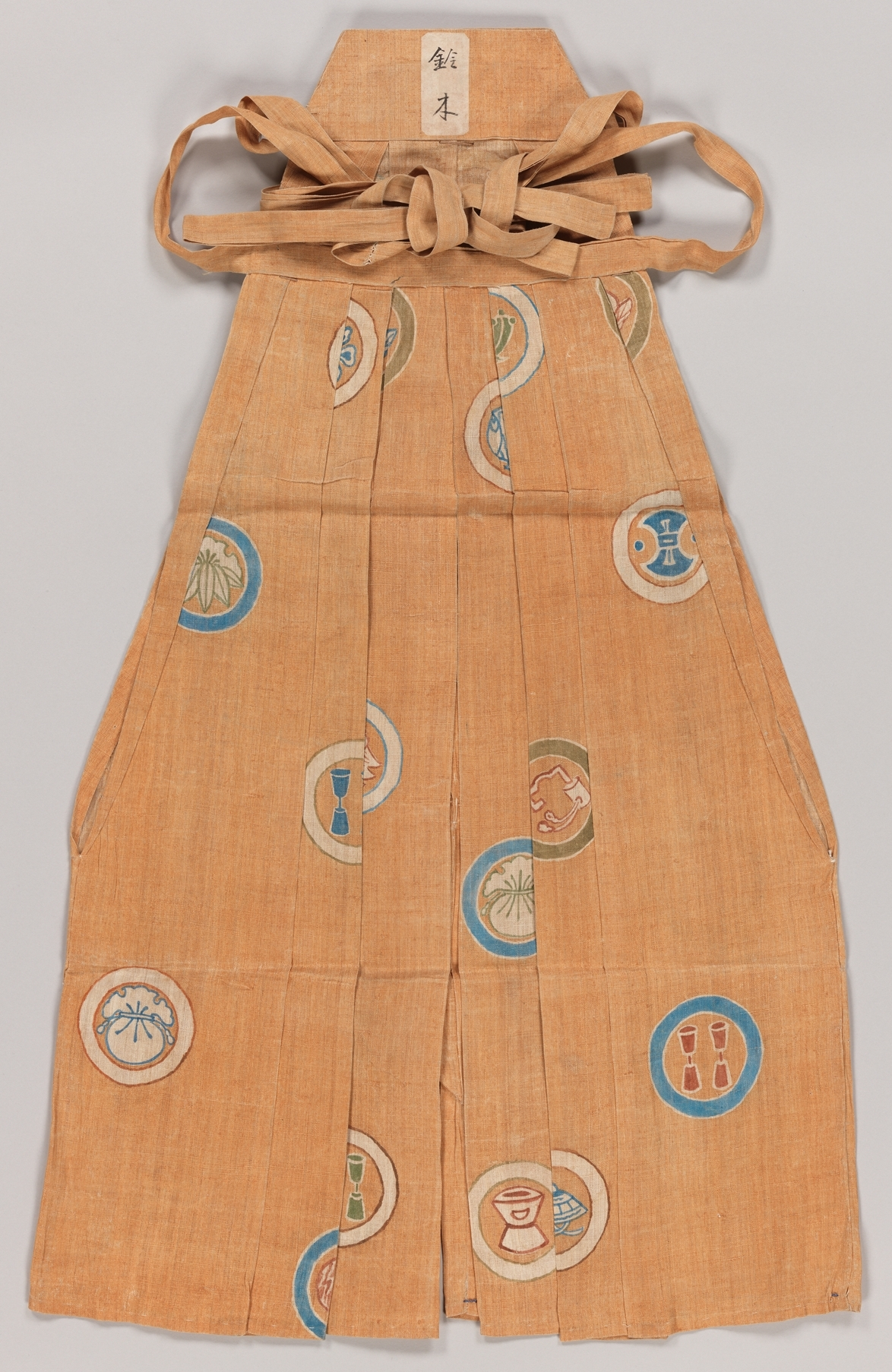
Japanese hakama from ramie fibre

Despite its strength, ramie has had limited acceptance for textile use. The fibre extraction and cleaning are expensive, chiefly because of the several steps—involving scraping, pounding, heating, washing, or exposure to chemicals. Some or all are needed to separate the raw fibre from the adhesive gums or resins. Spinning the fibre is difficult due to its brittle quality and low elasticity; and weaving is complicated by the hairy surface of the yarn, resulting from lack of cohesion between the fibres. Greater utilization of ramie may depend upon development of improved processing methods and the need to find plastic alternatives.

Ramie is used to make such products as industrial sewing thread, packing materials, fishing nets, and filter cloths. It is also made into fabrics for household furnishings (upholstery, canvas) and clothing, frequently in blends with other textile fibres (for instance when used in a mixture with wool, shrinkage is reported to be greatly reduced when compared with pure wool). Shorter fibres and waste are used in paper manufacture. Ramie ribbon is used in fine bookbinding as a substitute for traditional linen tape.

For the 2010 Prius, Toyota began using plant-derived plastics made from the cellulose in wood or grass instead of petroleum. One of the two principal crops used is ramie.

Ramie is also used as an ornamental plant in eastern Asia.

In Vietnam, ramie leaves are a main ingredient in making a Vietnamese glutinous rice cake called bánh gai (thorn leaf cake) or bánh gai Tứ Trụ in Thanh Hóa province. The leaves give the cake its distinct colour, flavour and fragrance.

In the Chinese Hakka community, ramie leaves are a main ingredient in making pancake-like dumplings with glutinous rice powder, sugar and water. These glutinous rice powder dumplings are similar to another Southeast Asian delicacy otherwise known as Kuih. The ramie leaves are picked, cleaned and ground in mortar, mixed into a dough of glutinous rice powder, water and sugar, kneaded thoroughly and placed on palm-sized square- or circular-cut banana leaves and steamed. The ramie leaves give the dumplings a dark green colour and unique aroma.

Ramie is also occasionally used in the construction of high performance rowing oar shafts. Mahe Drysdale used sculling oars made with ramie during the 2016 Rio Olympics where he won Gold in the Men's 1X Scull.

Ramie is often used to produce high-quality summer kimonos in Japan. In Japanese, the plant is called either ramie or choma (苧麻), while in the southern Okinawan islands it is known as bu. Well-known examples of ramie textiles include Yaeyama Jofu and Miyako Jofu, both prized for their fine quality and craftsmanship.

== Producers ==
China is the main producer of ramie. Others include Japan, Taiwan, the Philippines and Brazil. Only a small percentage of the ramie produced is available on the international market. Japan, Germany, France and the UK are the main importers; the remaining supply is used domestically.

== See also ==
- International Year of Natural Fibres
- Salish weaving § Nettle fibre
