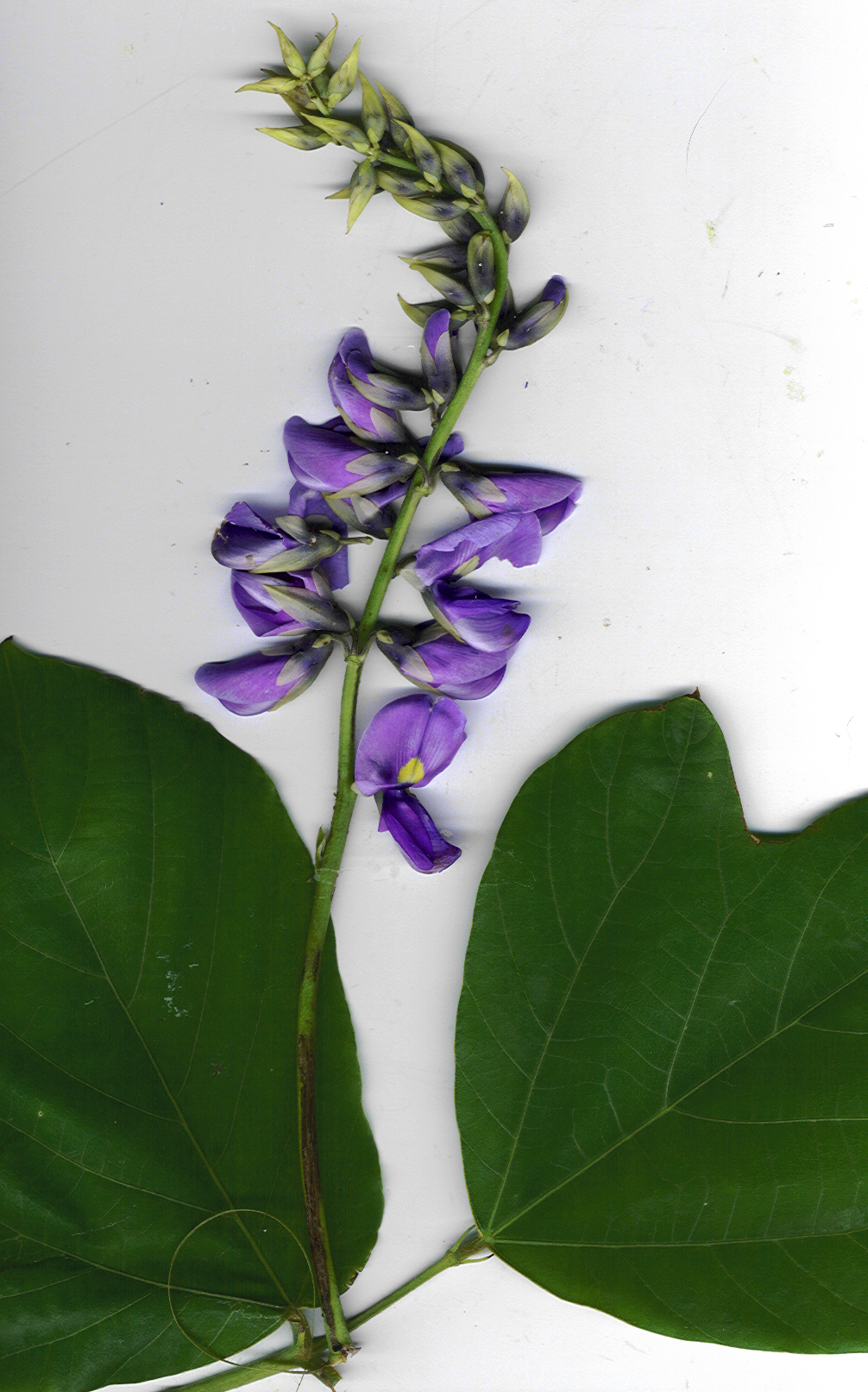

Scientific classification
- Kingdom: Plantae
- Clade: Tracheophytes
- Clade: Angiosperms
- Clade: Eudicots
- Clade: Rosids
- Order: Fabales
- Family: Fabaceae
- Subfamily: Faboideae
- Genus: Pueraria
- Species: P. montana
- Variety: P. m. var. lobata

Trinomial name
- Pueraria montana var. lobata (Willd.) Maesen & S.M.Almeida ex Sanjappa & Predeep

Synonyms
- List: Dolichos hirsutus Thunb.; Dolichos lobatus Willd.; Dolichos stipulaceus Lam.; Neustanthus chinensis Benth.; Pachyrhizus thunbergianus Siebold & Zucc.; Phaseolus aconitifolius Roxb.; Phaseolus cornutus Blume ex Miq.; Phaseolus ficifolius Schrank; Phaseolus lobatus (Willd.) Roxb. ex Wight & Arn.; Phaseolus trilobus Aiton; Pueraria argyi H.Lév. & Vaniot; Pueraria bodinieri H.Lév. & Vaniot; Pueraria caerulea H.Lév. & Vaniot; Pueraria chinensis (Benth.) Ohwi; Pueraria harmsii Rech.; Pueraria hirsuta (Thunb.) C.K.Schneid.; Pueraria koten H.Lév. & Vaniot; Pueraria lobata (Willd.) Ohwi; Pueraria montana var. chinensis (Ohwi) Maesen & S.M. Almeida ex Sanjappa & Predeep; Pueraria novoguineensis Warb.; Pueraria thunbergiana (Siebold & Zucc.) Benth.; Pueraria triloba (Aiton) Makino; Pueraria triloba var. leucostachya Honda; Pueraria volkensii Hosok.; Vigna lobata (Willd.) Endl. ex Miq.; Vigna stipulacea (Lam.) Kuntze

= Pueraria montana var. lobata =

Variety of legume

Pueraria montana var. lobata, the East Asian arrowroot, or kudzu vine, is a perennial plant in the family Fabaceae.

== Names ==
It is called gé (葛) in Chinese, kuzu (クズ, 葛) in Japanese, and chik (칡) or gal (갈; 葛) in Korean.

== Description ==
The Japanese arrowroot, Pueraria montana var. lobata, is a stoloniferous, semi-woody perennial plant that was introduced to the United States in 1876 at the Philadelphia Centennial Exhibition. This climbing vine has a growth rate of 1 ft per day and can rapidly outgrow native vegetation, trees, and other plants by completely covering plants and hindering their access to a light source. Pueraria montana also has large tuberous roots that take up more than half of its biomass and can reach soil depths of up to 16 feet. Vine growth is multi-directional and has a growth rate of 18 m per season which begins at the root crown where vine nodes meet the soil. P. montana also has trifoliate compound leaves with 3 lobe-shaped leaflets that are supported underneath by a hairy stem. Flowers can form on the vines which have a distinct grape-like fragrance, pink and purple-colored petals, and are produced during the blooming season that occurs from July to September. This vine is also capable of growing fruit that are clustered, seed-containing pods covered in distinct hair-like structures.

== Invasive status ==
Pueraria montana var. lobata is a highly invasive species that grows by smothering all other vegetation around it and climbing over seedlings and mature trees. This in turn can kill the smothered plants and impact their mutualistic interactions with other neighboring plants and animals. Infestations of P. montana can decrease biodiversity of various types of plants, animals, and insects that can all be affected by the reduction and killing of natives. This twining vine can also readily invade disturbed and abandoned areas, as well as natural habitats by girdling the trunks of trees and stems reinforced with wood. Due to the tension created from the twining of vines, trees can be tied together and potentially pulled down as the vines wrap around the overall structure of the trees. In addition, the root system of P. montana is leguminous in nature because it helps to enrich the soil through its association with nitrogen-fixing bacteria, but once the plant has infested a particular habitat its rapid growth can be difficult to control. According to Kato-Noguchi (2023), the fixed nitrogen of P. montana cannot only be transferred into the soil, but when in high concentrations, it is capable of leaching into various bodies of water and may impact aquatic ecosystems. Furthermore, this invasive species can also biosynthesize isoprene that gets released into the atmosphere in large amounts and can in turn influence air quality.

== Reproduction ==
Pueraria montana mainly spreads by vegetative propagation via rhizomes, runners, and can produce new plants at the nodes of roots. This perennial plant can also reproduce using sexual reproduction which occurs via insect pollination with bees or other pollinators although seed production and viability is low.

== Growth and habitat ==
P. montana has a wide range of natural habitats including mixed forests, areas made up of shrubs, alongside the edges of bodies of water, as well as abandoned or disturbed areas. This species grows on loam soil with a pH ranging between 4.5 – 7.0, on soils that are poor in nutrients, or on soils that fall between the pH ranges of 3 and 8. Growth rates are also optimal when P. montana receives the requirement of 1,000 – 15,000 mm of rain per year. In addition, this species may also thrive in areas where winter conditions are mild (ranging between 5 – 15 °C) and summer temperatures are hot (above 25 °C). Although its large root system allows it to survive in freezing temperatures that can drop to -29 °C.

== Management and control ==
Prevention efforts are typically not completely successful and eradication efforts can be expensive and complex processes. Efficiency of control methods depend on the size of the infestation, proximity to desirable or native species, and accessibility of the infesting patch. Pueraria montana var. lobata exhibits various reproductive pathways which makes it more difficult to control its dispersal. Nevertheless, there are numerous methods utilized to control the spread of Pueraria montana var. lobata, including herbicide application, mowing, grazing, burning, and biological control.

Herbicide applications have effectively produced high destruction rates, leading to decreased infestations and lower management costs, particularly when applied annually. Applications may have to be repeated for up to 10 years to achieve complete eradication, depending on the size and age of the population, as older and larger populations may require twice as much herbicide. Picloram has historically been the most effective herbicide for controlling Kudzu populations but is detrimental to the environment by leaving soil residues and contamination of groundwater. The biodegradable herbicide Glyphosate has been proven to be effective for controlling Kudzu populations, is safe to use in close proximity to water, and does minimal damage to natural habitats. Prescribed burning may be used in some areas following herbicide application in order to clear out leaf litter and catalyze the recolonization of native species. It is essential to vegetate the area with more desirable plant species following eradication.

In a 2012 study, researchers imitated herbivorous feeding by damaging Kudzu populations through leaf cutting and terminal clipping to determine the effectiveness of predation on controlling invasive Kudzu populations in China. It was found that damage to aboveground plant parts reduces the ability of new plants to produce and store carbohydrates, thus reducing its competitive ability. This provides evidence that leaf-feeding insects could serve as host-specific biological control agents against Pueraria montana var. lobata.

Alternative methods have also been used to control Pueraria montana var. lobata populations. Populations that are young in age and small in size can be eradicated with consistent burning, mowing, and grazing. Prescribed burning can be effective after usage of herbicides, but when used on its own, has little effect on the roots and root crown. Mowing is effective for reducing the height of the plants, but is more effective for eradication when used as a precursor to herbicide application. However, mowing can potentially spread portions of Kudzu vines to other areas where it can form a new plant. Eradication by grazing is a lengthy process and can take multiple years and requires a heavy grazing rotation and efforts to concentrate grazing on only Kudzu plants. To prevent re-growth, all root tissue must be destroyed, which can be difficult due to deeply buried root systems.

== Distribution ==
The plant is native to East Asia (China, Taiwan, Japan, Korea), the Russian Far East, Southeast Asia (Indonesia, Malaysia, the Philippines, Thailand and Vietnam), and the Pacific (New Caledonia, Papua New Guinea, Solomon Islands, and Vanuatu).

== Uses ==
Pueraria montana var. lobata has several practical applications, as well as uses in medicine and cosmetics. More than 70 phytochemical are present in Kudzu root, with the major groups being isoflavonoids and triterpenoids with their glycosides. 41 phytochemicals, including large amounts of isoflavones have been identified within Kudzu flowers. One of the major phytochemicals in Kudzu plants is puerarin, which has antioxidant and anti-aging properties. The chemical components of both root and flower are useful for both medicinal and cosmetic purposes. The leaves of Kudzu plants can be consumed as vegetables and are high in triterpenoid saponins and isoflavones, which have several health benefits.

The root of Pueraria montana var. lobata, which is rich in bioactive constituents, has been used in traditional medicine in Eastern Asia. The Kudzu flowers have also been used in traditional medicine for conditions such as dysentery and alcoholism. The phytochemicals in kudzu plants contain many antioxidants, which can lower the risk of several disorders such as atherosclerosis, diabetes, and cancer. When used in combination with other medicinal herbs, Pueraria montana var. lobata was found to reduce fasting blood glucose levels in patients with type 2 diabetes mellitus. Pueraria montana var. lobata also has hepatoprotective properties and can be used in combination with other botanical drugs to enhance the effects of treating acute liver injury.

Phytochemical compounds that are present in Pueraria montana var. lobata, particularly flavonoid compounds, which are widely used ingredients for cosmetics, prove Kudzu to be a potential source for bioactive compounds in future cosmetic applications. The phytochemical puerarin, which exists in the root of Kudzu, has been shown to inhibit the formation of advanced glycation end (AGEs) products related to skin-aging. Other studies have shown the potential of phytochemicals to participate in skin regeneration by promoting migration, proliferation, and collagen synthesis and thereby promoting skin pro-inflammatory activity and epithelialization which results in skin regeneration and healing. This makes Pueraria montana var. lobata a potentially useful alternative for the production of anti-aging and skin-regeneration cosmetics. Also, the melanogenesis inhibitory activity of Pueraria montana is of special interest in cosmetics, particularly in Asia where lighter skin is preferred amongst women. Studies have shown that the plant's extract consists of anti-melanogenesis activity by activating Akt/GSK-3b and interrupting maturation of tyrosinase by inhibiting a-glucosidase.

Additionally, research has been done to examine the use of Pueraria montana var. lobata nanocellulose as a sustainable packaging material. Researchers found that isolated kudzu cellulose nanocrystals (CNCs) are a suitable reinforcing material for nanocomposites. However, further research is necessary to determine sustainable CNC extraction methods.

The starch powder made from the East Asian arrowroot is called kudzu powder. Kudzu powder is used to make arrowroot tea in traditional medicines of China, Japan and Korea (in Korea the root unprepared is also used).

The production of this powder in Japan was concentrated among the Kuzu (国栖) people who once lived along the Yoshino River in Nara Prefecture, which gave the plant its Japanese (and later loaned into English kudzu) name.

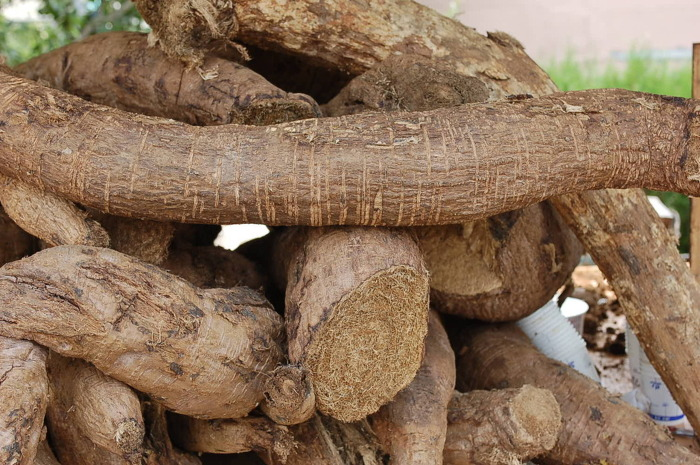
East Asian arrowroot.

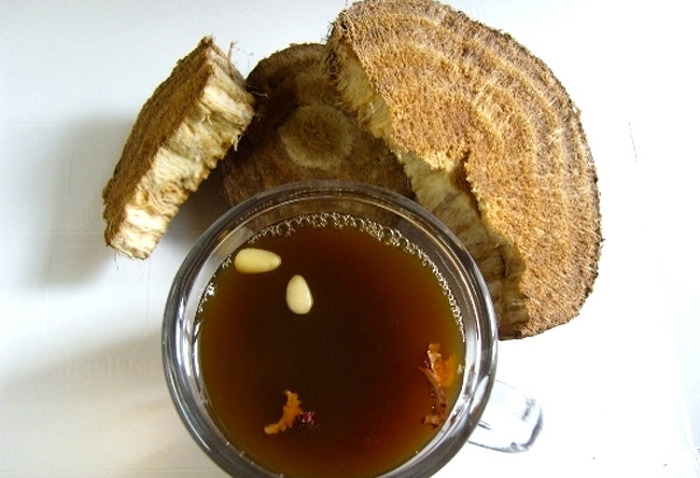
Arrowroot tea.

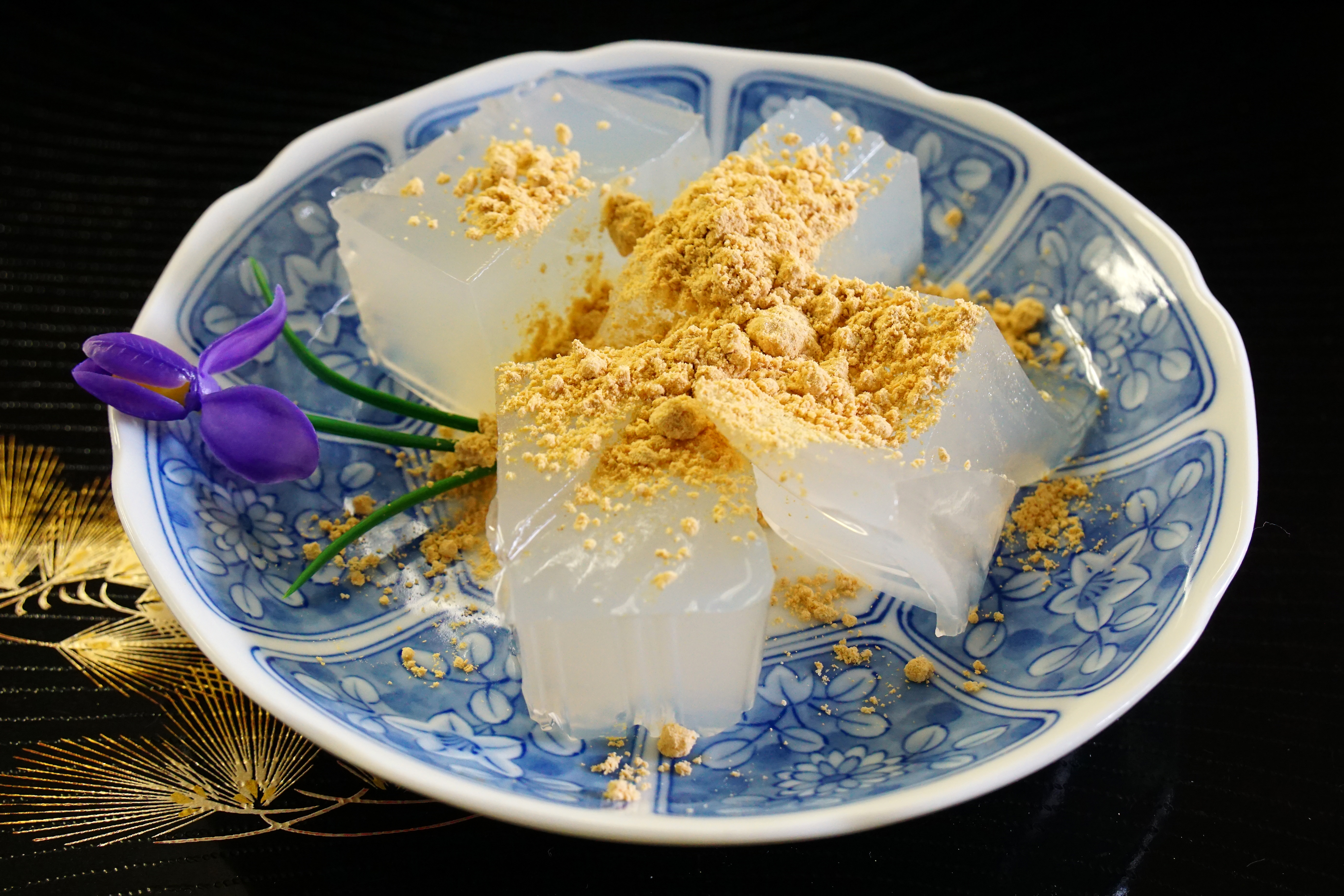
Kuzumochi made using kudzu powder.
