= Miyako jofu =

Ikat-dyed ramie cloth from Miyakojima, Okinawa

Miyako jofu (宮古上布; Okinawan:Husu) is a traditional Japanese textile made from the ramie plant that is produced in Miyakojima, Okinawa. It often features a kasuri design and has a glossy finish and high breathability.

In 1975, miyako jofu was recognized as a traditional craft by the Ministry of Economy, Trade and Industry (METI). In 1978, it was designated as Intangible Cultural Property by the Japanese government. The manufacturing method of ramie thread for miyako jofu, known as choma thread twisting (苧麻糸手績み) was chosen as a Selected Conservation Technique in 2003.

== History ==
Records of ramie textile production dating back to the 15th century have been found in the Joseon Korean text Ri-cho Jitsuroku. According to one origin story, the textile was presented to the Ryukyu Kingdom by a Miyako woman, Toji Inaishi, following her husband's appointment as a funeral priest. Another story suggests that the wife of a shipbuilder had woven cloth from ramie to show her gratitude to the Ryukyu king when her husband was awarded a land grant.

With the invasion of the Ryukyu Islands by the Satsuma Domain in 1609, a harsh head poll tax was levied against Miyakojima residents, and the women were expected to submit miyako jofu as their form of tax payment. The Satsuma Domain then distributed and sold the fabric, under the name of satsuma jofu, to other domains in the country. Influenced by preferences of the Satsuma Domain and the economic strain caused by their poll tax, indigo blue became the standard color for miyako jofu.

In 1903, the head poll tax was abolished and the Miyako Textile Cooperative was established in order to facilitate miyako jofu production and its distribution nationally. Miyako jofu production peaked during the early 20th century but began declining during World War II when the production of Miyakojima was temporarily suspended.

== Manufacturing process ==
The creation of Miyako jofu from the processing of raw materials to the completion of the final fabric is extremely time intensive and it can take multiple months or years of labor to complete a roll. Although the initial stages of harvesting and shredding the ramie plants can be accomplished in groups, the remaining stages of thread production, design, dying, weaving, and finishing are delegated to specialists in their respective stages.

Fibers from the stems of the ramie plants, referred to as choma in Miyakoan, are used to create the thread of Miyako jofu. To create the thread, first the ramie plant is stripped down to a stalk and the inner white fibers are removed and shred by rubbing an abalone shell or knife against a stalk that has been softened through steaming. These fibers are soaked once more in a high alkaline bath and hung to dry.

Once dried, individual fibers are twisted together by hand in a process called bunmi. These hand twisted strands are again wound even tighter into a more durable and uniform thread using a Japanese spinning wheel that sits on the floor. Manually joining the fibers together to produce enough thread for one roll of fabric can take over three months.

A pattern drafted onto graph paper, known as izu, is used to determine the design and the dying process which is similar to ikat. The hand spun thread is bundled into groups and bound, either by hand or by a Kasuri Shimebara machine, in accordance with the design. The kasuri bounding method prevents selected areas of the thread from being exposed to dye, thus allowing weavers to create a pattern without relying on separate threads for different colors. The thread is typically dyed in an indigo bath multiple times until the desired color is achieved.

After the thread has been dyed and dried out, it is woven on a loom. Because the ramie thread is very delicate, it is often set into the loom using one's fingernails or a needle-like device. Due to the fineness of the thread and the precision required to realize a kasuri design, a high skilled weaver can only create approximately 20 cm of fabric per day. A high quality piece of Miyako jofu could take up two to six months depending on the intricacy and length of the fabric.

In the last stages, the woven fabric is washed and brushed with starch glue made from sweet potatoes. The fabric is then finished by placing it on a board and pounding it with a large mallet, polishing the fabric into its signature gloss.

== Uses ==
The fabric is used to make kimono, and primarily worn in the summer. The fabric is so thin that it is often compared to the wings of the dragonfly.

== Sources ==
- Matsumoto, Yuka, "The History and the Present of a Traditional Textile of Okinawa, Japan A Narrative of the People in Miyako Island and Miyako-jofu Textile" Textile Society of America Symposium Proceedings (2006). https://digitalcommons.unl.edu/tsaconf/316/
- Miller, Dorothy M. "Miyako Jofu" Ars Textrina 7 (1987). http://ulita.leeds.ac.uk/files/2014/06/6.Miyako-jofu.pdf
