= Platypria hystrix =

Scientific classification
- Kingdom: Animalia
- Phylum: Arthropoda
- Clade: Pancrustacea
- Class: Insecta
- Order: Coleoptera
- Suborder: Polyphaga
- Infraorder: Cucujiformia
- Family: Chrysomelidae
- Genus: Platypria
- Species: P. hystrix

Binomial name
- Platypria hystrix (Fabricius, 1798)

Synonyms
- Hispa hystrix Fabricius, 1798; Hispa erinacea Olivier, 1808 (not Fabricius); Platypria digitata Gestro, 1888; Platypria echinogale Gestro, 1897; Platypria ericulus Gestro, 1890; Platypria sumatrensis Csiki, 1900; Platypria echinogale testaceicollis Heller, 1916; Platypria fenestrata latenigra Pic, 1927

Species of beetle

Platypria (Platypria) hystrix, is a species of leaf beetle found in India, China, Indonesia, Myanmar, Nepal, Sri Lanka, Thailand and Vietnam.

== Description ==
Antenna thin, which is extending beyond scutellum over pronotum. There are five spines on each side of the anterior lateral lobe of elytra.

== Biology ==
The adult female lays eggs singly on the adaxial side of the leaves. These individual eggs are inserted into a depression made on the leaf. Then the eggs are covered with a yellow secretion that gradually turns red-brown on drying. This secretion later forms the oblong-oval crusty ootheca with an average size of 1.03 to 1.32 mm in length. From the middle of the ootheca, a long, thread-like process can arise. Eggs are hatch in about 4 to 7 days after oviposition. Even after the hatching and formation of the leaf mine, this process and the ootheca outer wall are intact.

The first instar hatched out of the egg mines and starts to feed and move through the mesophyll tissues. The length of the first instar grub is about 1.8 mm. The larval head is chitinous brown and body translucent-greenish, where the alimentary canal is visible in dark green after feeding mesophyll tissues. The final instar is about 5 mm long. Pupation occurs in a separate U-shaped pupal mine. The pupal period is about 7 days.

It is found in wide varieties of host plants including: Cajanus cajan, Cajanus indicus, Desmodium gangeticum, Dolichos lablab, Erythrina arborescens, Erythrina stricta, Erythrina subumbrans, Erythrina variegata, Glycine max, Mucuna pruriens, Phaseolus, Pueraria montana var. lobata, Pueraria phaseoloides, Pueraria tuberosa, Sesbania aculeata, Sesbania grandiflora, Tephrosia candida, Castanea, Myrica rubra, Ziziphus, Rubus ellipticus, and Uncaria gambir.

It has observed that Braconid wasps parasitize mature instars and ants attack pupa.
