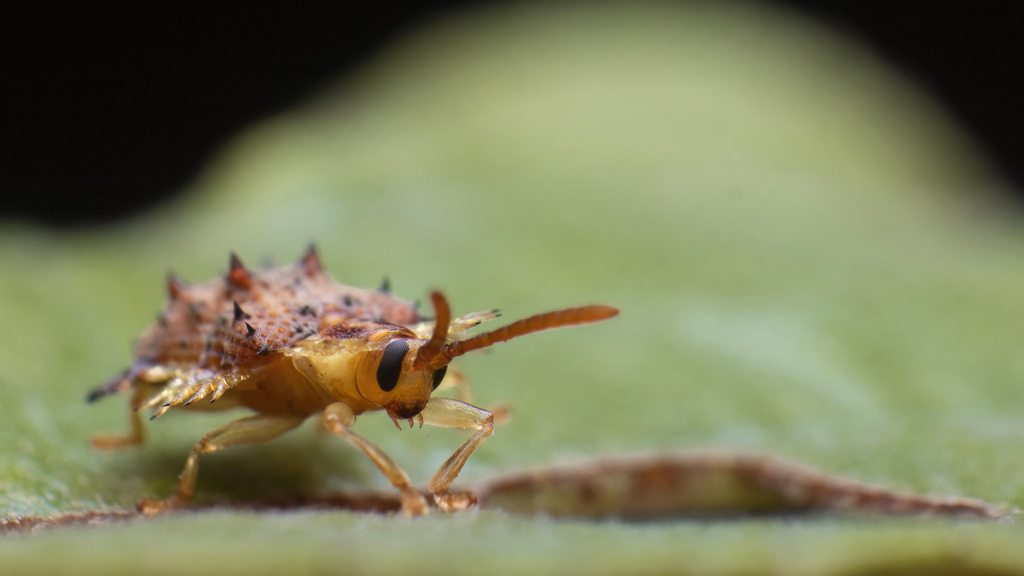

Scientific classification
- Kingdom: Animalia
- Phylum: Arthropoda
- Clade: Pancrustacea
- Class: Insecta
- Order: Coleoptera
- Suborder: Polyphaga
- Infraorder: Cucujiformia
- Family: Chrysomelidae
- Genus: Platypria
- Species: P. erinaceus

Binomial name
- Platypria erinaceus (Fabricius, 1801)

Synonyms
- Hispa erinaceus Fabricius, 1801; Platypria andrewesi Weise, 1904; Platypria erinaceus bengalensis Gestro, 1897

= Platypria erinaceus =

Species of beetle

Platypria (Platypria) erinaceus, is a species of leaf beetle native to India (Bihar, Gujarat, Himachal Pradesh, Madhya Pradesh, Maharashtra, Pondicherry, Punjab, Tamil Nadu), Sri Lanka, Bangladesh, Myanmar, Nepal and Pakistan.

== Description ==
The antenna are thick.

== Biology ==
It is found in wide varieties of host plants including: Desmodium gangeticum, Erythrina, Pueraria tuberosa, Oryza sativa, Saccharum officinarum, Ziziphus jujuba, Ziziphus mauritiana and Ziziphus nummularia.
