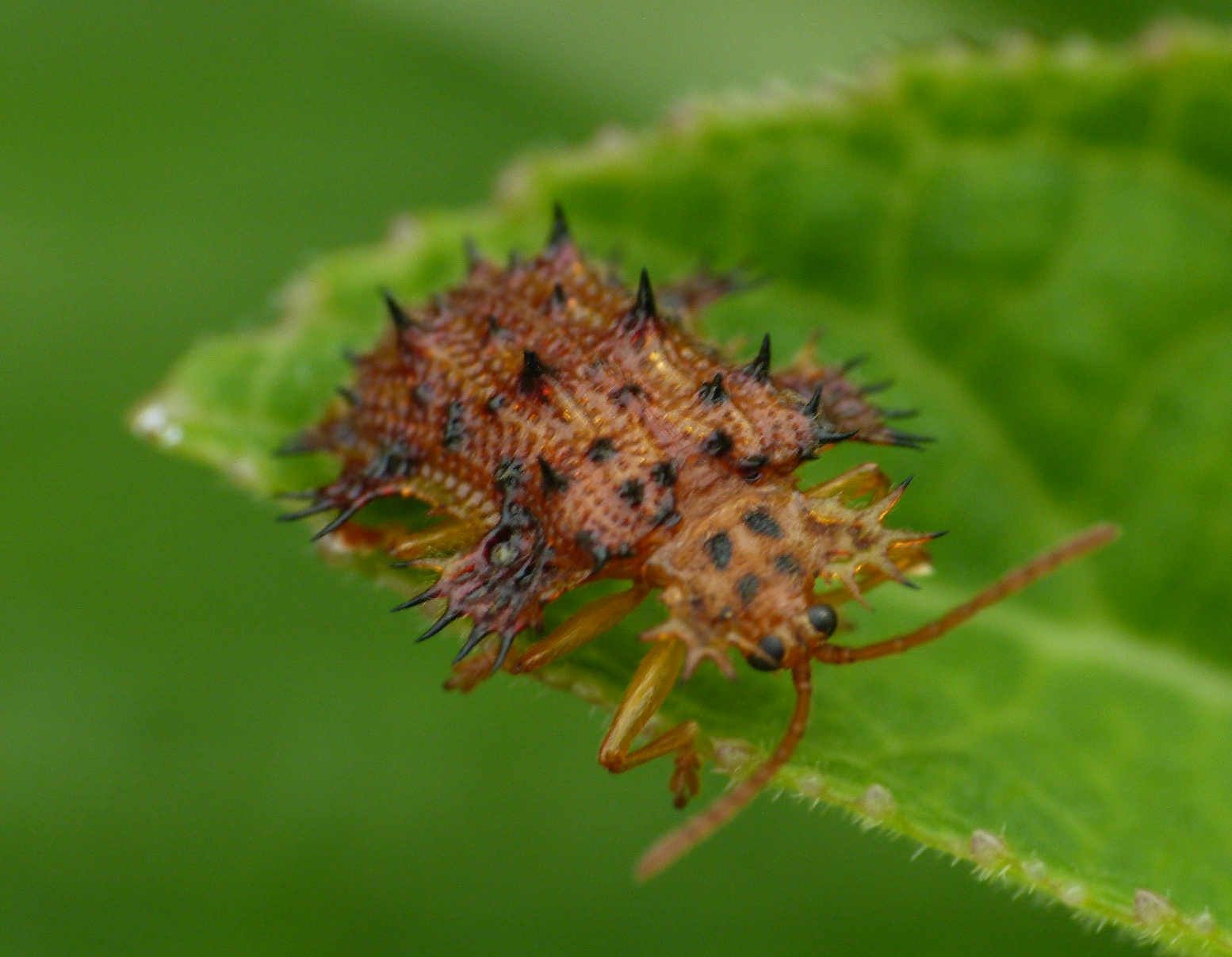

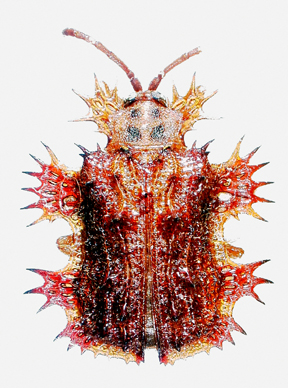

Scientific classification
- Kingdom: Animalia
- Phylum: Arthropoda
- Clade: Pancrustacea
- Class: Insecta
- Order: Coleoptera
- Suborder: Polyphaga
- Infraorder: Cucujiformia
- Family: Chrysomelidae
- Genus: Platypria
- Species: P. echidna

Binomial name
- Platypria echidna Guérin-Méneville, 1840

= Platypria echidna =

Species of beetle

Platypria (Platypria) echidna, is a species of leaf beetle found India (Bihar, Goa, Kerala, Karnataka, Maharashtra, Sikkim, Tamil Nadu), Sri Lanka, Myanmar, Vietnam, Bangladesh, China (Yunnan), Cambodia, Japan, Nepal and Thailand.

== Description ==
Antenna thin, which is extending beyond scutellum over pronotum. There are six spines on each side of the anterior lateral lobe of the elytra. Elytra is covered with white pubescence. Elytral punctures are large and sub-quadrate. The anterior and posterior-lateral lobes on the elytra are reddish.

== Biology ==
Adult female lays a single egg covered with secretions that becomes an ootheca. It is found in wide varieties of host plants including: Mallotus, Desmodium gangeticum, Erythrina subumbrans, Erythrina lithosperma, Erythrina variegata, Pueraria tuberosa, Ziziphus mauritiana, Ziziphus nummularia, Ziziphus oenoplia, Ziziphus rugosa, and Ziziphus xylopyrus.
