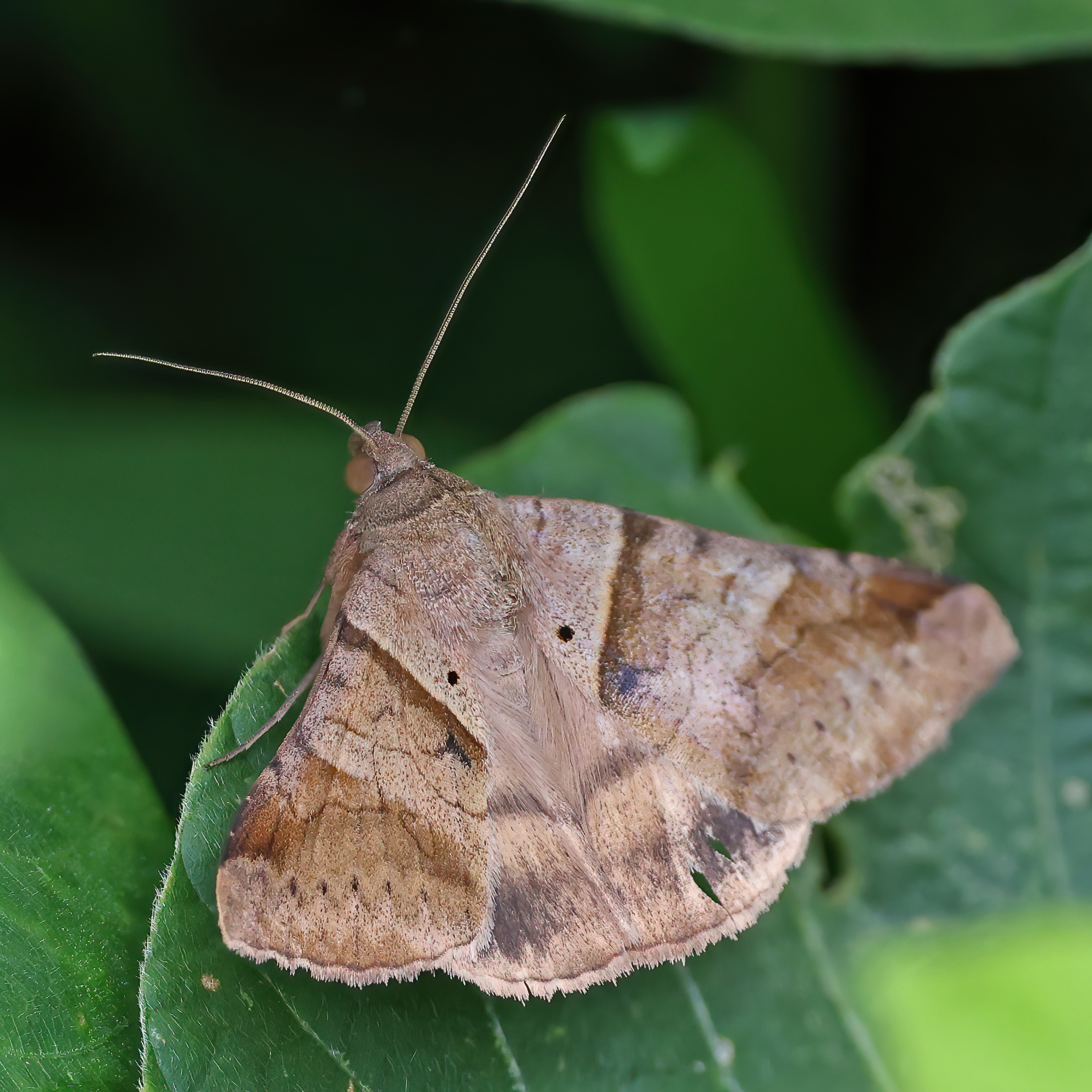

Scientific classification
- Domain: Eukaryota
- Kingdom: Animalia
- Phylum: Arthropoda
- Class: Insecta
- Order: Lepidoptera
- Superfamily: Noctuoidea
- Family: Erebidae
- Genus: Mocis
- Species: M. undata

Binomial name
- Mocis undata (Fabricius, 1775)

Synonyms
- Noctua undata Fabricius, 1775; Remigia archesia Hampson, 1782; Phalaena archesia Cramer, 1782; Phalaena virbia Cramer, 1782; Remigia gregalis Guenée, 1852; Ophisma velata Walker, 1864; Remigia bifasciata Walker, 1865; Cauninda bifasciata Warren, 1913; Mocis uberia Wileman, 1923; Mocis virbia (Cramer, 1782)

= Mocis undata =

Brown-striped semilooper

Species of moth

Mocis undata, the brown-striped semilooper, is a moth of the family Erebidae. The species was first described by Johan Christian Fabricius in 1775. It is found in the Afrotropical and Oriental regions, including India and Sri Lanka.

== Description ==
The male has a mid and hind tibia and is clothed with long hair. Body pale red-brown. Abdomen pale fuscous, the anal tuft ochreous. Forewing with a short sub-basal red-brown line. An oblique antemedial pale of ochreous line present, with diffused red-brown band on its outer edge. A sinuous medial line angled on median nervure. Reniform large and indistinct. A red-brown diffused postmedial band, on which is a dark line slightly curved outwards beyond the cell, and at vein 2, it is very irregularly curved inwards to lower angle of cell, then descending to inner margin. An indistinct pale waved sub-marginal line present with a black specks series on it. There is a dark waved marginal line. Hindwings ochreous fuscous, with narrow fuscous medial band and diffused sub-marginal band. Legs rufous.

Larva purplish brown speckled with black. The lateral area yellowish with red lines. A sub-lateral row of small black dots present. Head brownish with red lateral streak. Pupa efflorescent. The larvae feed on Cytisus, Desmodium, Wisteria, Arachis, Butea, Cajanus, Calopogonium, Crotalaria, Derris, Glycine, Indigofera, Mucuna, Phaseolus, Pueraria, Rhynchosia, Tephrosia, Vigna, Shorea, Hevea, Gossypium, Nephelium and Solanum species.
