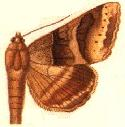

Scientific classification
- Kingdom: Animalia
- Phylum: Arthropoda
- Clade: Pancrustacea
- Class: Insecta
- Order: Lepidoptera
- Superfamily: Noctuoidea
- Family: Erebidae
- Genus: Mocis
- Species: M. trifasciata

Binomial name
- Mocis trifasciata (Stephens, 1830)

Synonyms
- Catephia trifasciata Stephens, 1830; Remigia demonstrans Walker, 1858; Mocis demonstrans (Walker, 1858); Remigia discrepans Butler, 1886; Mocis discrepans (Butler, 1886); Mocis uniformis Strand, 1917

= Mocis trifasciata =

Species of moth

Mocis trifasciata is a moth of the family Erebidae. It is found in the south-west Pacific region, including Samoa, Fiji, Hawaii, New Zealand, the Society Islands and Queensland, Australia.

The larvae feed on Vigna unguiculata, Oryza sativa and Agathis, Pueraria and Brachiaria species.
