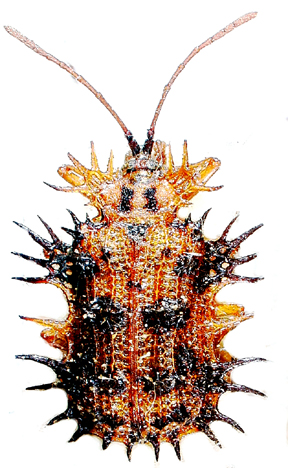

Scientific classification
- Kingdom: Animalia
- Phylum: Arthropoda
- Class: Insecta
- Order: Coleoptera
- Suborder: Polyphaga
- Infraorder: Cucujiformia
- Family: Chrysomelidae
- Genus: Platypria
- Species: P. coronata

Binomial name
- Platypria coronata Guérin-Méneville, 1840

Synonyms
- Platypria (Dichirispa) alticola Gestro, 1914; Platypria raffrayi Chapuis, 1877; Platypria transvaalensis Péringuey, 1898; Platypria connexa Péringuey, 1898; Hispa usambarica Weise, 1898; Dichirispa coendu Gestro, 1911; Platypria coendu; Platypria (Dichirispa) atherura Gestro, 1914; Platypria (Dichirispa) auromicans Gestro, 1923; Platypria (Dichirispa) loveni Weise, 1926; Platypria funebris kalongana Uhmann, 1936; Platypria coronata inchoata Uhmann, 1954

= Platypria coronata =

Species of beetle

Platypria coronata is a species of beetle of the family Chrysomelidae. It is found in Angola, Congo, Eritrea, Gabon, Guinea, Kenya, Mozambique, Nigeria, Rwanda, Senegal, South Africa, Sudan, Tanzania, Uganda and Zimbabwe.

== Life history ==
The recorded host plants for this species are Desmodium repandum and Pueraria phaseoloides.
