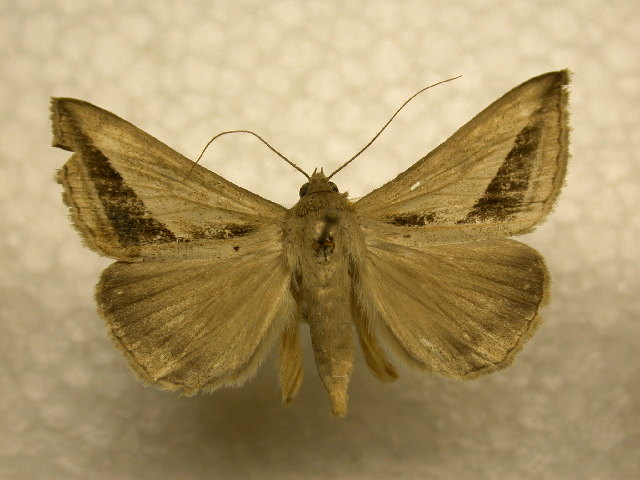

Scientific classification
- Kingdom: Animalia
- Phylum: Arthropoda
- Class: Insecta
- Order: Lepidoptera
- Superfamily: Noctuoidea
- Family: Erebidae
- Genus: Mocis
- Species: M. dyndima

Binomial name
- Mocis dyndima (Stoll, 1782)

Synonyms
- Phalaena dyndima Stoll, 1782; Chalciope dindyma Hubner, 1823; Phurys teligera Walker, 1867

= Mocis dyndima =

Species of moth

Mocis dyndima is a species of moth of the family Erebidae. It is found in Belize, Costa Rica, Venezuela and Colombia.
