= Platypria luctuosa =

Scientific classification
- Kingdom: Animalia
- Phylum: Arthropoda
- Class: Insecta
- Order: Coleoptera
- Suborder: Polyphaga
- Infraorder: Cucujiformia
- Family: Chrysomelidae
- Genus: Platypria
- Species: P. luctuosa

Binomial name
- Platypria luctuosa Chapuis, 1877

Species of beetle

Platypria luctuosa is a species of beetle of the family Chrysomelidae. It is found in Cameroon, Congo, Guinea, Guinea-Bissau, Guinea, Nigeria and Togo.

== Life history ==
No host plant has been documented for this species.
