= Platypria corpulenta =

Scientific classification
- Kingdom: Animalia
- Phylum: Arthropoda
- Class: Insecta
- Order: Coleoptera
- Suborder: Polyphaga
- Infraorder: Cucujiformia
- Family: Chrysomelidae
- Genus: Platypria
- Species: P. corpulenta

Binomial name
- Platypria corpulenta Weise, 1910

Synonyms
- Platypria corpulenta congoana Uhmann, 1937

Species of beetle

Platypria corpulenta is a species of beetle of the family Chrysomelidae. It is found in Congo, Equatorial Guinea, Guinea, Gabon, Rwanda and Togo.

== Life history ==
No host plant has been documented for this species.
