= Mocis paraguayica =

Scientific classification
- Kingdom: Animalia
- Phylum: Arthropoda
- Class: Insecta
- Order: Lepidoptera
- Superfamily: Noctuoidea
- Family: Erebidae
- Genus: Mocis
- Species: M. paraguayica

Binomial name
- Mocis paraguayica Hampson, 1913

Species of moth

Mocis paraguayica is a species of moth of the family Erebidae. It is found in Paraguay.
