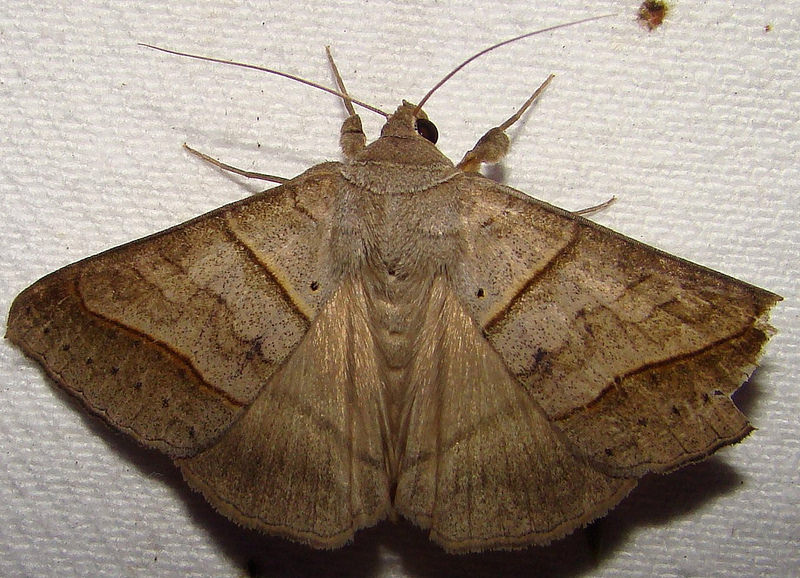

Scientific classification
- Domain: Eukaryota
- Kingdom: Animalia
- Phylum: Arthropoda
- Class: Insecta
- Order: Lepidoptera
- Superfamily: Noctuoidea
- Family: Erebidae
- Genus: Mocis
- Species: M. texana

Binomial name
- Mocis texana (Morrison, 1875)

Synonyms
- Remigia latipes texana Morrison, 1875; Mocis hexastylus (Harvey, 1875); Remigia hexastylus Harvey, 1875

= Mocis texana =

Species of moth

Mocis texana, the Texas mocis, is a species of moth of the family Erebidae. It is found in eastern North America, from southern Ontario, south to Florida, west to Texas to Minnesota.

The wingspan is 42–50 millimetres (1.7–2.0 in). Adults are on wing from April to September.

The larvae feed on Digitaria species.
