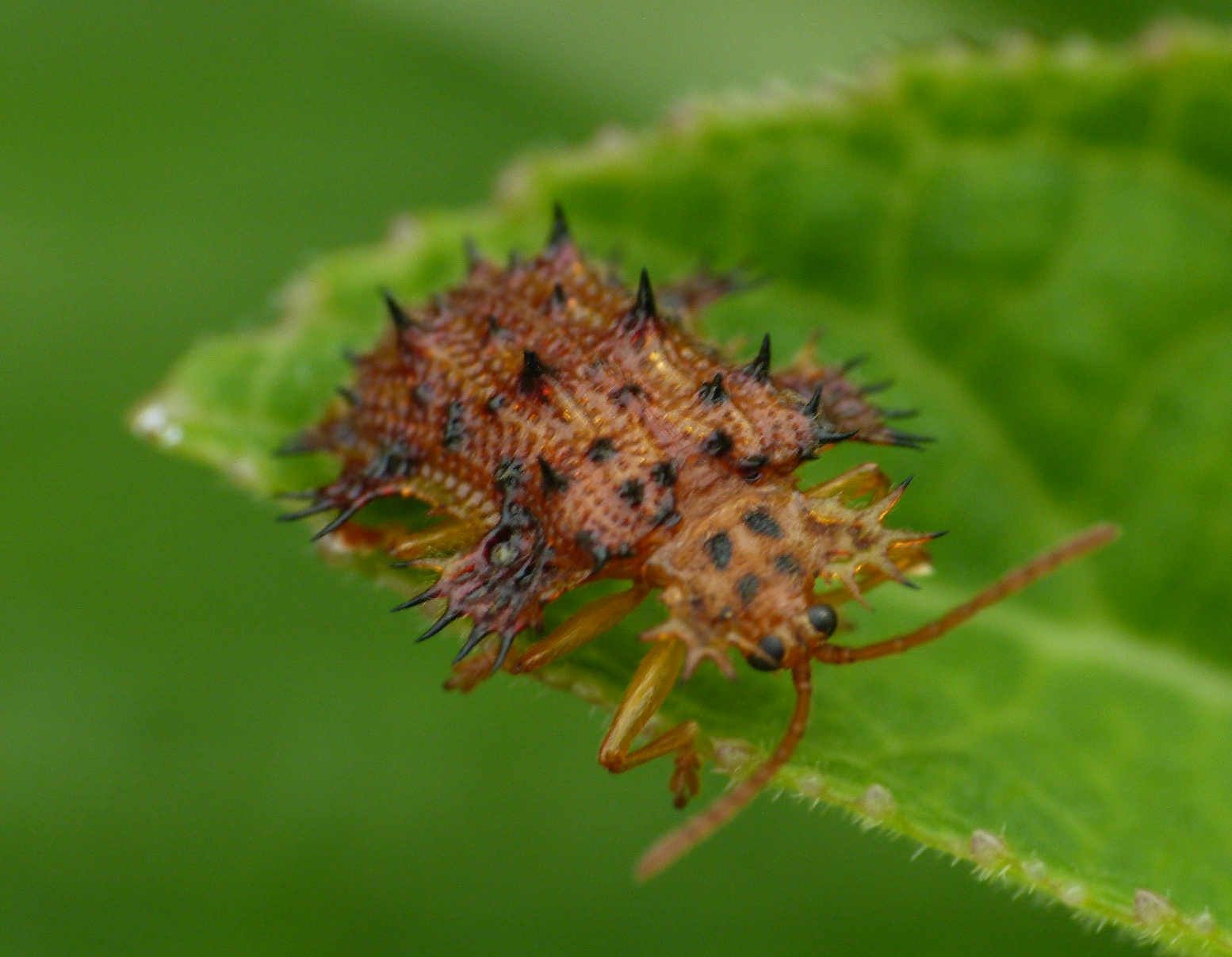
- Platypria echidna

Scientific classification
- Kingdom: Animalia
- Phylum: Arthropoda
- Clade: Pancrustacea
- Class: Insecta
- Order: Coleoptera
- Suborder: Polyphaga
- Infraorder: Cucujiformia
- Family: Chrysomelidae
- Subfamily: Cassidinae
- Tribe: Hispini
- Genus: Platypria; Guérin-Méneville, 1840

Type species
- Hispa echidna Guérin-Méneville, 1840

Synonyms
- Lobacantha Kirby, 1837; Dichirispa Gestro, 1890

= Platypria =

Genus of beetles

Platypria is a genus of hispine leaf-beetles. There are about 34 species found mostly in the Asian and African tropics. The larvae mine the leaves of plants and hosts include plants in the families Euphorbiaceae, Fabaceae, Myricaceae, Poaceae, Rhamnaceae, Roseaceae and Rubiaceae. The adults are 4 to 7 mm long and have spine like growths on the pronotum and elytra. There are also translucent patches on the elytra. The antennae have 9 segments and arise close to each other on the head.

Species in the genus are placed under two subgenera Platypria and Dichirispa. The translucent windows on the elytra margins are found in the subgenus Platypria.

== Species ==
- Subgenus Dichirispa Gestro, 1890
  - Platypria abdominalis Chapuis, 1877
  - Platypria arabica Medvedev, 2012
  - Platypria centetes (Guérin-Méneville, 1840)
  - Platypria coronata Guérin-Méneville, 1840
  - Platypria corpulenta Weise, 1910
  - Platypria decemspinosa Kraatz, 1895
  - Platypria funebris Gestro, 1905
  - Platypria hastulata Uhmann, 1954
  - Platypria luctuosa Chapuis, 1877
  - Platypria natalensis Gestro, 1905
  - Platypria nigrospinosa Fairmaire, 1891
  - Platypria nodifera Spaeth, 1934
- Subgenus Platypria
  - Platypria acanthion Gestro, 1890
  - Platypria bakeri Gestro, 1922
  - Platypria chaetomys Gestro, 1903
  - Platypria chiroptera Gestro, 1899
  - Platypria dimidiata Chapuis, 1877
  - Platypria echidna Guérin-Méneville, 1840
  - Platypria erinaceus (Fabricius, 1801)
  - Platypria fenestrata Pic, 1924
  - Platypria hystrix (Fabricius, 1798)
  - Platypria infuscata Gestro, 1917
  - Platypria longispina Chapuis, 1876
  - Platypria melli Uhmann, 1955
  - Platypria moluccana Weise, 1922
  - Platypria paucispinosa Gestro, 1905
  - Platypria seminigra Heller, 1916
  - Platypria subopaca Chapuis, 1876
  - Platypria yunnana Gressitt, 1939
- Unplaced to subgenus
  - Platypria alces Gressitt, 1938
  - Platypria aliena Chen & Sun, 1962
  - Platypria paracanthion Chen & Sun, 1962
  - Platypria parva Chen & Sun, 1964

== Selected former species ==
- Platypria clavareaui Weise, 1902
- Platypria coendu Gestro, 1911
- Platypria ertli Weise, 1912
- Platypria feae Gestro, 1905
- Platypria tuberculata Achard, 1917
- Platypria ugandina Spaeth, 1937
