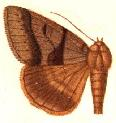

Scientific classification
- Domain: Eukaryota
- Kingdom: Animalia
- Phylum: Arthropoda
- Class: Insecta
- Order: Lepidoptera
- Superfamily: Noctuoidea
- Family: Erebidae
- Genus: Mocis
- Species: M. discios

Binomial name
- Mocis discios (Kollar, 1844)

Synonyms
- Ophiusa discios Kollar, 1844

= Mocis discios =

Species of moth

Mocis discios is a moth of the family Erebidae. It is found in the Himalaya.
