= Mocis propugnata =

Scientific classification
- Domain: Eukaryota
- Kingdom: Animalia
- Phylum: Arthropoda
- Class: Insecta
- Order: Lepidoptera
- Superfamily: Noctuoidea
- Family: Erebidae
- Genus: Mocis
- Species: M. propugnata

Binomial name
- Mocis propugnata (Leech, 1900)

Synonyms
- Remigia propugnata Leech, 1900

Species of moth

Mocis propugnata is a species of moth of the family Erebidae. It is found in China.
