= Platypria melli =

Scientific classification
- Kingdom: Animalia
- Phylum: Arthropoda
- Class: Insecta
- Order: Coleoptera
- Suborder: Polyphaga
- Infraorder: Cucujiformia
- Family: Chrysomelidae
- Genus: Platypria
- Species: P. melli

Binomial name
- Platypria melli Uhmann, 1955

Species of beetle

Platypria melli is a species of beetle of the family Chrysomelidae. It is found in Bhutan, China (Anhui, Fujian, Hunan, Guangdong, Sichuan, Yunnan) and Japan.

== Life history ==
The recorded host plants for this species are Paliurus ramosissimus, Ziziphus jujuba and Hovenia species.
