= Mocis phasianoides =

Scientific classification
- Domain: Eukaryota
- Kingdom: Animalia
- Phylum: Arthropoda
- Class: Insecta
- Order: Lepidoptera
- Superfamily: Noctuoidea
- Family: Erebidae
- Genus: Mocis
- Species: M. phasianoides

Binomial name
- Mocis phasianoides (Guenée, 1919)

Synonyms
- Pelamia phasianoides Guenée, 1852

Species of moth

Mocis phasianoides is a species of moth of the family Erebidae. It is found in Uruguay and Paraguay.
