= Mocis undifera =

Scientific classification
- Kingdom: Animalia
- Phylum: Arthropoda
- Class: Insecta
- Order: Lepidoptera
- Superfamily: Noctuoidea
- Family: Erebidae
- Genus: Mocis
- Species: M. undifera

Binomial name
- Mocis undifera Hampson, 1913

Species of moth

Mocis undifera is a species of moth of the family Erebidae. It is found in South America, including Ecuador.
