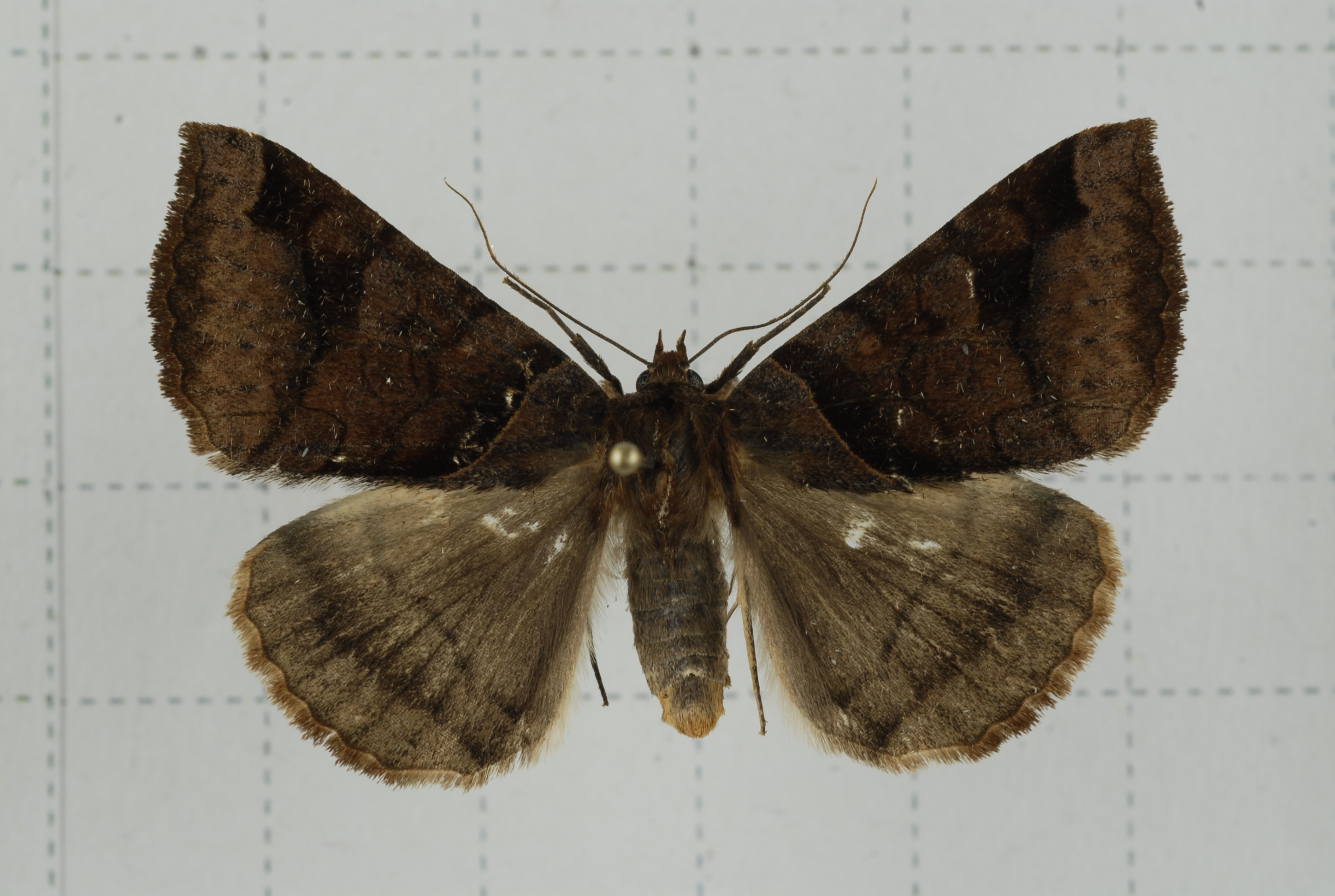

Scientific classification
- Domain: Eukaryota
- Kingdom: Animalia
- Phylum: Arthropoda
- Class: Insecta
- Order: Lepidoptera
- Superfamily: Noctuoidea
- Family: Erebidae
- Genus: Mocis
- Species: M. annetta

Binomial name
- Mocis annetta (Butler, 1878)

Synonyms
- Remigia annetta Butler, 1878; Cauninda arabesca Bryk, 1949

= Mocis annetta =

Species of moth

Mocis annetta is a species of moth of the family Erebidae. It is found in Russia (south-eastern Siberia, Amur, Ussuri, Primorje), China (Shaanxi), Korea, Taiwan and Japan (Hokkaido, Honshu).

The wingspan is 40–47 millimetres (1.6–1.9 in).
