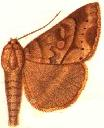

Scientific classification
- Kingdom: Animalia
- Phylum: Arthropoda
- Class: Insecta
- Order: Lepidoptera
- Superfamily: Noctuoidea
- Family: Erebidae
- Genus: Mocis
- Species: M. diffluens

Binomial name
- Mocis diffluens (Guenée, 1852)

Synonyms
- Mocis mensuralis (Walker, 1858); Remigia diffluens Guenée, 1852; Remigia mensuralis Walker, 1858

= Mocis diffluens =

Species of moth

Mocis diffluens is a moth of the family Erebidae. It is found from Mexico south through Central America to South America as well as on the Antilles.

The wingspan is about 38 millimetres (1.5 in).
