= Platypria nigrospinosa =

Scientific classification
- Kingdom: Animalia
- Phylum: Arthropoda
- Class: Insecta
- Order: Coleoptera
- Suborder: Polyphaga
- Infraorder: Cucujiformia
- Family: Chrysomelidae
- Genus: Platypria
- Species: P. nigrospinosa

Binomial name
- Platypria nigrospinosa Fairmaire, 1891

Synonyms
- Platypria mashuna Péringuey, 1898; Platypria mashonana kigonserensis Weise, 1906; Platypria mashonana Weise, 1910; Platypria (Dichirispa) ertli Weise, 1913; Platypria maculata Uhmann, 1928

Species of beetle

Platypria nigrospinosa is a species of beetle of the family Chrysomelidae. It is found in Angola, Burundi, Congo, Ethiopia, Kenya, Mozambique, Somalia, South Africa, Tanzania and Zimbabwe.

== Life history ==
No host plant has been documented for this species.
