= Platypria dimidiata =

Scientific classification
- Kingdom: Animalia
- Phylum: Arthropoda
- Clade: Pancrustacea
- Class: Insecta
- Order: Coleoptera
- Suborder: Polyphaga
- Infraorder: Cucujiformia
- Family: Chrysomelidae
- Genus: Platypria
- Species: P. dimidiata

Binomial name
- Platypria dimidiata Chapuis, 1877

Synonyms
- Platypria dimidiata atrata Gestro, 1897

Species of beetle

Platypria dimidiata is a species of beetle of the family Chrysomelidae. It is found in Indonesia (Borneo, Java, Malacca, Sumatra) and Malaysia.

== Life history ==
No host plant has been documented for this species.
