= Platypria centetes =

Scientific classification
- Kingdom: Animalia
- Phylum: Arthropoda
- Class: Insecta
- Order: Coleoptera
- Suborder: Polyphaga
- Infraorder: Cucujiformia
- Family: Chrysomelidae
- Genus: Platypria
- Species: P. centetes

Binomial name
- Platypria centetes (Guérin-Méneville, 1840)

Synonyms
- Dichirispa centetes Guérin-Méneville, 1840; Platypria centetes obscurata Uhmann, 1954

Species of beetle

Platypria centetes is a species of beetle of the family Chrysomelidae. It is found in Congo, Guinea, Kenya, Nigeria, Rwanda, Senegal, Sierra Leone, Sudan, Tanzania, Togo and Uganda.

== Life history ==
No host plant has been documented for this species.
