= Platypria subopaca =

Scientific classification
- Kingdom: Animalia
- Phylum: Arthropoda
- Clade: Pancrustacea
- Class: Insecta
- Order: Coleoptera
- Suborder: Polyphaga
- Infraorder: Cucujiformia
- Family: Chrysomelidae
- Genus: Platypria
- Species: P. subopaca

Binomial name
- Platypria subopaca Chapuis, 1876

Synonyms
- Platypria squalida Gestro, 1898

Species of beetle

Platypria subopaca is a species of beetle of the family Chrysomelidae. It is found in Indonesia (Sulawesi, Sumatra) and the Philippines (Biliran, Mindanao).

== Life history ==
No host plant has been documented for this species.
