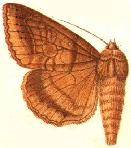

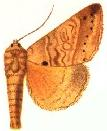

Scientific classification
- Kingdom: Animalia
- Phylum: Arthropoda
- Clade: Pancrustacea
- Class: Insecta
- Order: Lepidoptera
- Superfamily: Noctuoidea
- Family: Erebidae
- Genus: Mocis
- Species: M. repanda

Binomial name
- Mocis repanda (Fabricius, 1794)

Synonyms
- Noctua repanda Fabricius, 1794; Mocis megas (Guenée, 1852); Remigia megas Guenée, 1852; Mocis alipes (Felder and Rogenhofer, 1874); Remigia alipes Felder and Rogenhofer, 1874; Mocis munda (Walker, 1865); Remigia munda Walker, 1865; Mocis remanens (Walker, 1858); Remigia remanens Walker, 1858

= Mocis repanda =

Species of moth

Mocis repanda, the striped grass looper, is a species of moth of the family Erebidae. It was described by Johan Christian Fabricius in 1794. It is found in Central America and the Caribbean, including Cuba, the Dominican Republic, Guadeloupe, Guatemala, Jamaica, Puerto Rico and Saint Thomas. Strays can be found in the United States, up to southern Texas as well as subtropical Africa south of the Sahara, including the islands of the Indian Ocean.

The larvae feed on various grasses, including Cenchrus viridis, Trichlons pluriflora, Eriochloa punctata, Leptochloa walleye and Panica fasciculata. It is considered a pest on corn, sugarcane and Bermuda grass.

It has a wingspan of about 40 millimetres (1.6 in).
