= Platypria arabica =

Scientific classification
- Kingdom: Animalia
- Phylum: Arthropoda
- Class: Insecta
- Order: Coleoptera
- Suborder: Polyphaga
- Infraorder: Cucujiformia
- Family: Chrysomelidae
- Genus: Platypria
- Species: P. arabica

Binomial name
- Platypria arabica Medvedev, 2012

Species of beetle

Platypria arabica is a species of beetle of the family Chrysomelidae. It is found in Yemen.

== Description ==
Adults reach a length of about 7 mm. They are fulvous. There is a black V-shaped marking before the scutellum on the prothorax and the elytra have black dorsal spines and tubercles.

== Life history ==
No host plant has been documented for this species.
