= Platypria paucispinosa =

Scientific classification
- Kingdom: Animalia
- Phylum: Arthropoda
- Class: Insecta
- Order: Coleoptera
- Suborder: Polyphaga
- Infraorder: Cucujiformia
- Family: Chrysomelidae
- Genus: Platypria
- Species: P. paucispinosa

Binomial name
- Platypria paucispinosa Gestro, 1905

Synonyms
- Platypria feae Gestro, 1905

Species of beetle

Platypria paucispinosa is a species of beetle of the family Chrysomelidae. It is found in Congo and São Tomé and Príncipe.

== Life history ==
The recorded host plant for this species is Icacina manni.
