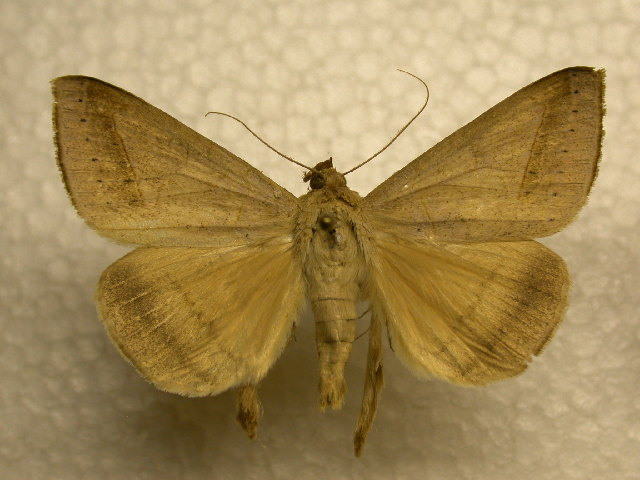

Scientific classification
- Kingdom: Animalia
- Phylum: Arthropoda
- Class: Insecta
- Order: Lepidoptera
- Superfamily: Noctuoidea
- Family: Erebidae
- Genus: Mocis
- Species: M. marcida

Binomial name
- Mocis marcida (Guenée, 1852)

Synonyms
- Remigia marcida Guenée, 1852; Mocis perlata (Walker, 1858); Phurys perlata Walker, 1858

= Mocis marcida =

Withered mocis

Species of moth

Mocis marcida, the withered mocis, is a species of moth of the family Erebidae. It is found from the coast of North Carolina to Florida, west to Texas, rarely straying northward as far as New York.

The wingspan is about 47 millimetres (1.9 in). Adults are on wing from April to November or all year round in southern Florida and Texas. There are multiple generations per year.

The larvae feed on various grasses.
