= Platypria acanthion =

Scientific classification
- Kingdom: Animalia
- Phylum: Arthropoda
- Class: Insecta
- Order: Coleoptera
- Suborder: Polyphaga
- Infraorder: Cucujiformia
- Family: Chrysomelidae
- Genus: Platypria
- Species: P. acanthion

Binomial name
- Platypria acanthion Gestro, 1890

Synonyms
- Platypria erethizon Gestro, 1897

Species of beetle

Platypria acanthion is a species of beetle of the family Chrysomelidae. It is found in China (Yunnan), Myanmar and Vietnam.

== Life history ==
No host plant has been documented for this species.
