= Mocis sobria =

Scientific classification
- Kingdom: Animalia
- Phylum: Arthropoda
- Clade: Pancrustacea
- Class: Insecta
- Order: Lepidoptera
- Superfamily: Noctuoidea
- Family: Erebidae
- Genus: Mocis
- Species: M. sobria

Binomial name
- Mocis sobria (Möschler, 1880)

Synonyms
- Remigia sobria Möschler, 1880

Species of moth

Mocis sobria is a species of moth of the family Erebidae. It is found in Suriname and Brazil.
