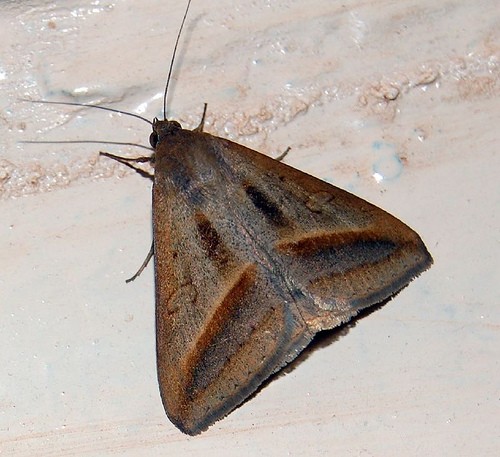

Scientific classification
- Domain: Eukaryota
- Kingdom: Animalia
- Phylum: Arthropoda
- Class: Insecta
- Order: Lepidoptera
- Superfamily: Noctuoidea
- Family: Erebidae
- Genus: Mocis
- Species: M. frugalis

Binomial name
- Mocis frugalis (Fabricius, 1775)

Synonyms
- Noctua frugalis Fabricius, 1775; Remigia translata Walker, 1865; Chalciope lycopodia Geyer, 1837; Remigia frugalis Fabricius, 1775

= Mocis frugalis =

Sugarcane looper

Species of moth

Mocis frugalis, the sugarcane looper, is a moth of the family Erebidae. The species was first described by Johan Christian Fabricius in 1775. It is found in several parts of the world, including India, Sri Lanka, West African countries and other Oriental regions. The adult is a fruit piercer and a major pest of crops.

== Taxonomy ==
In a recent publication Mocis proverai, that is found in Africa and on the Arabian peninsula has been promoted to a separate species. Both species can be distinguished by microscopic examination of their genitalia.

== Description ==
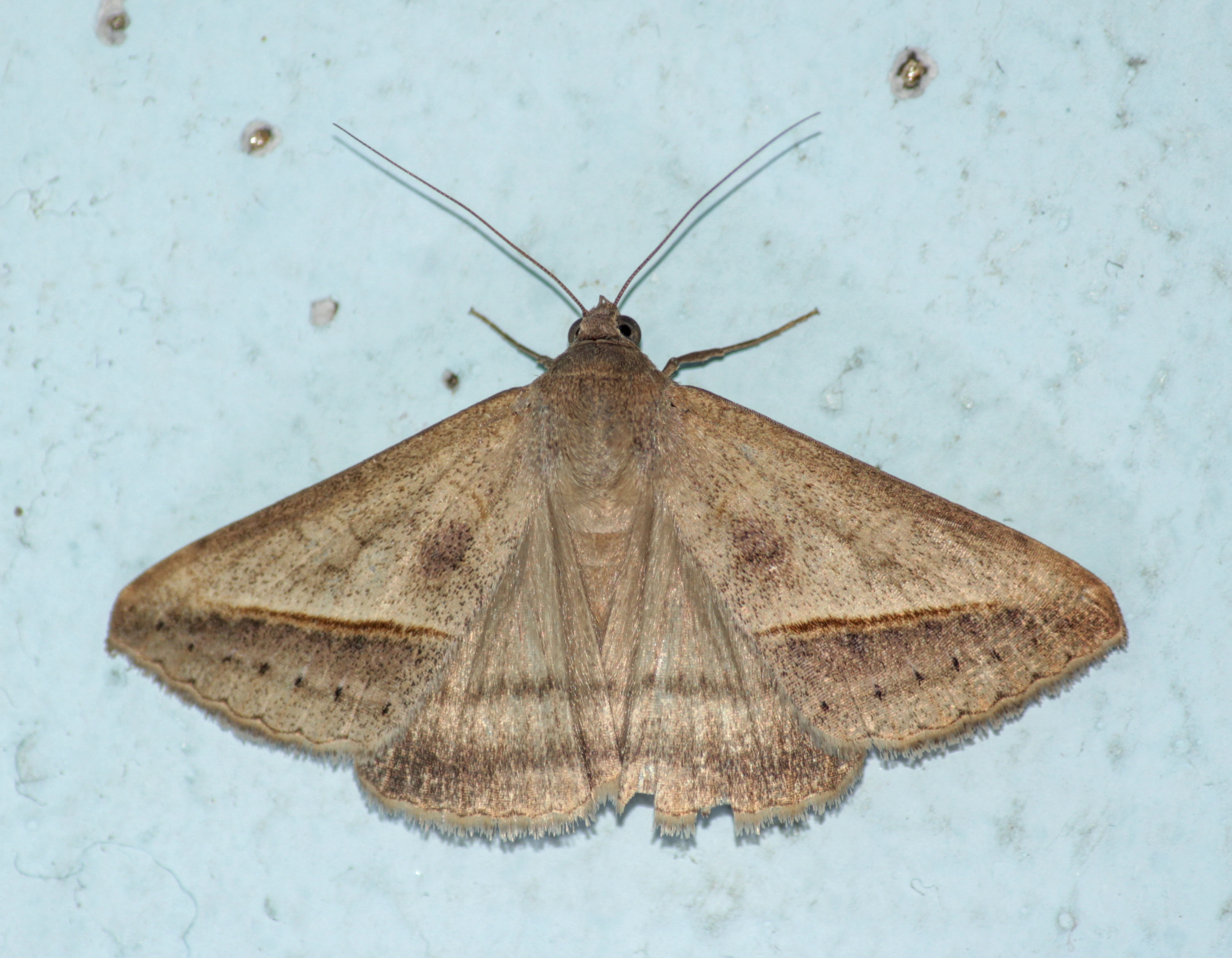
At Kanjirappally, Kerala.

Its wingspan is 36–50 millimetres (1.4–2.0 in). Male with the hind tibia and tarsi clothed with long thick pile. It has a grey-brown body. Forewing with a diffused dark mark above the centre of vein 1; an oblique postmedial line pale inwardly, red brown outwardly; a submarginal series of black specks. Hindwing with postmedial and diffused submarginal lines. Some specimens have a black spot above inner margin of forewing before the middle.

Larva pale yellowish ochreous, with darker lines. Two subdorsal lines present and with a sublateral series of olivaceous spots. The 4th and 5th somites are edged behind with black. Food plants include Zingiberaceae species, Andropogon, Eleusine, Oryza, Panicum, Paspalum, Saccharum, Sorghum, Zea, Typhonium, Cyperus, Glycine, Medicago, and Vigna. Eggs are darkish green, blotched with dark purple. ||
