= Platypria yunnana =

Scientific classification
- Kingdom: Animalia
- Phylum: Arthropoda
- Class: Insecta
- Order: Coleoptera
- Suborder: Polyphaga
- Infraorder: Cucujiformia
- Family: Chrysomelidae
- Genus: Platypria
- Species: P. yunnana

Binomial name
- Platypria yunnana Gressitt, 1939

Species of beetle

Platypria yunnana is a species of beetle of the family Chrysomelidae. It is found in Yunnan, China.

== Life history ==
No host plant has been documented for this species.
