= Mocis ancilla =

Scientific classification
- Domain: Eukaryota
- Kingdom: Animalia
- Phylum: Arthropoda
- Class: Insecta
- Order: Lepidoptera
- Superfamily: Noctuoidea
- Family: Erebidae
- Genus: Mocis
- Species: M. ancilla

Binomial name
- Mocis ancilla (Warren, 1913)

Synonyms
- Cauninda ancilla Warren, 1913

Species of moth

Mocis ancilla is a species of moth of the family Erebidae. It is found in Russia (south-eastern Siberia, Ussuri, Primorje), China (Shaanxi), Korea and Japan (Honshu).

The wingspan is 33–36 millimetres (1.3–1.4 in).
