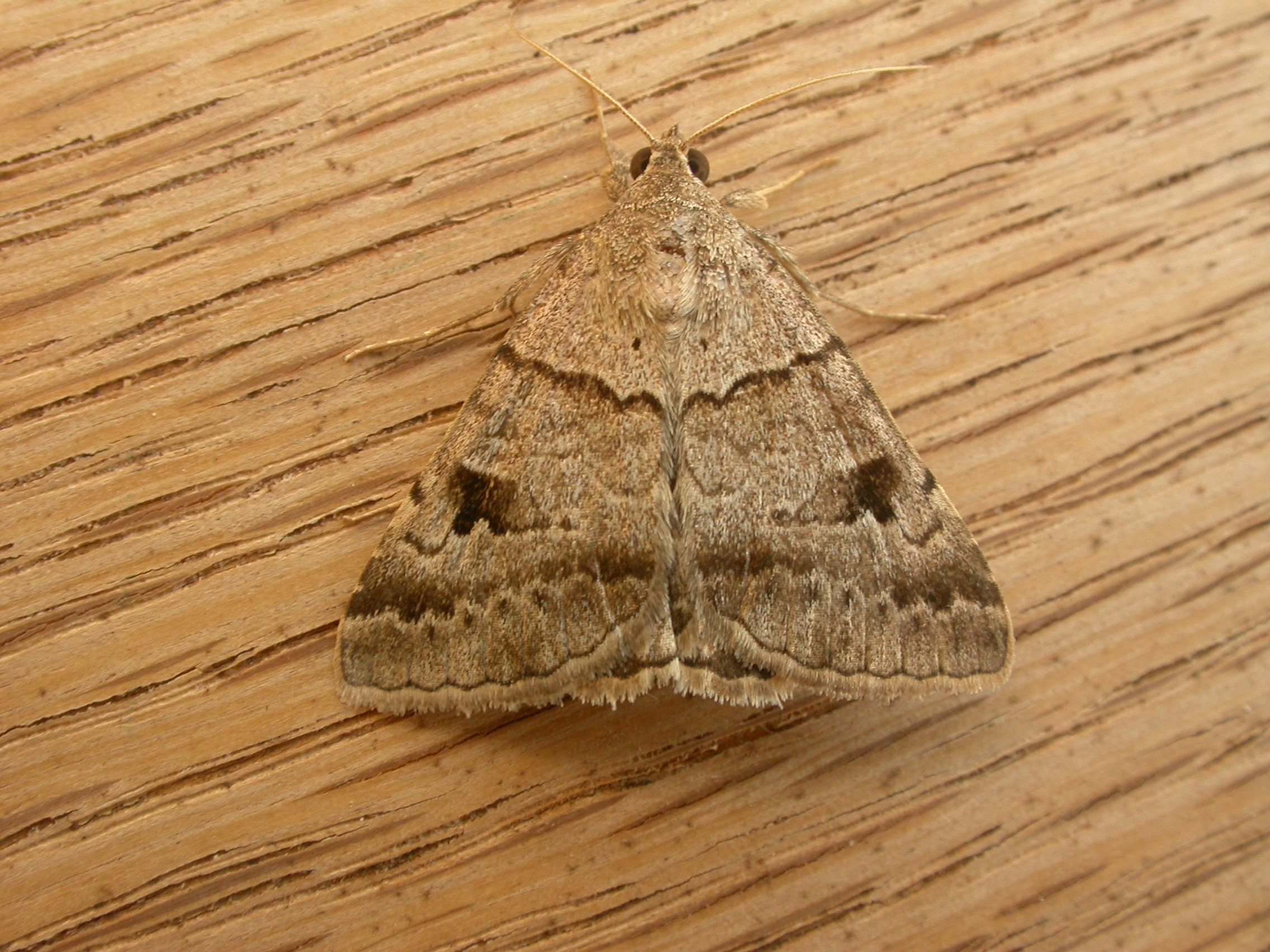
- Dorsal view
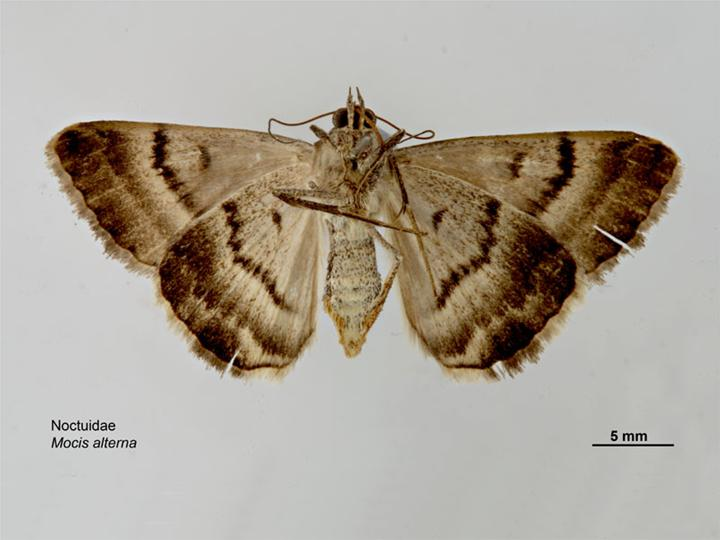
- Ventral view

Scientific classification
- Kingdom: Animalia
- Phylum: Arthropoda
- Class: Insecta
- Order: Lepidoptera
- Superfamily: Noctuoidea
- Family: Erebidae
- Genus: Mocis
- Species: M. alterna

Binomial name
- Mocis alterna (Walker, 1858)

Synonyms
- Euclidia nebuligera (Butler, 1886); Euclidia alterna Walker, 1858; Pseudophia nebuligera Butler, 1886

= Mocis alterna =

Species of moth

Mocis alterna, the bean looper, is a species of moth of the family Erebidae first described by Francis Walker in 1858. It is found in the Australian state of Queensland.

The wingspan is about 30 millimetres (1.2 in).

The larvae feed on Phaseolus, Medicago sativa and Glycine max.
