= Platypria longispina =

Scientific classification
- Kingdom: Animalia
- Phylum: Arthropoda
- Class: Insecta
- Order: Coleoptera
- Suborder: Polyphaga
- Infraorder: Cucujiformia
- Family: Chrysomelidae
- Genus: Platypria
- Species: P. longispina

Binomial name
- Platypria longispina Chapuis, 1876

Synonyms
- Platypria ferruginea Weise, 1913; Platypria invreae Gestro, 1917

Species of beetle

Platypria longispina is a species of beetle of the family Chrysomelidae. It is found in the Philippines (Basilan, Biliran, Leyte, Luzon, Mindanao, Mindoro).

== Life history ==
No host plant has been documented for this species.
