= Platypria natalensis =

Scientific classification
- Kingdom: Animalia
- Phylum: Arthropoda
- Class: Insecta
- Order: Coleoptera
- Suborder: Polyphaga
- Infraorder: Cucujiformia
- Family: Chrysomelidae
- Genus: Platypria
- Species: P. natalensis

Binomial name
- Platypria natalensis Gestro, 1905

Synonyms
- Platypria (Dichirispa) natalensis hastulata Uhmann, 1953

Species of beetle

Platypria natalensis is a species of beetle of the family Chrysomelidae. It is found in Rwanda, South Africa and Zimbabwe.

== Life history ==
No host plant has been documented for this species.
