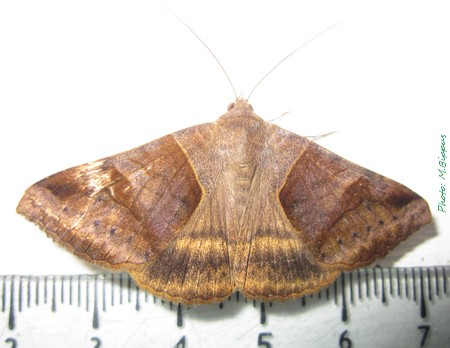

Scientific classification
- Kingdom: Animalia
- Phylum: Arthropoda
- Clade: Pancrustacea
- Class: Insecta
- Order: Lepidoptera
- Superfamily: Noctuoidea
- Family: Erebidae
- Tribe: Euclidiini
- Genus: Mocis; Hübner, [1823]

Synonyms
- Baratha Walker, 1865; Cauninda Moore, 1885; Pelamia Guenée, 1852; Remigia Guenée, 1852

= Mocis =

Genus of moths

Mocis is a genus of moths in the family Erebidae. The genus was erected by Jacob Hübner in 1823.

Lepidopterist David Wagner et al. state about the behaviour of Mocis larvae: "Unlike most catocaline larvae, Mocis caterpillars do not wriggle violently when accosted, but rather simply drop to the ground--a habit shared by many grass feeders--where their coloration blends in with dead, withered grass blades."

== Species ==
- Mocis alterna (Walker, 1858)
- Mocis ancilla (Warren, 1913)
- Mocis annetta (Butler, 1878) (= M. arabesca)
- Mocis antillesia Hampson, 1913
- Mocis bahamica Hampson, 1913
- Mocis camptogramma Dognin, 1919
- Mocis conveniens (Walker, 1858) (= M. detersa)
- Mocis cubana Hampson, 1913
- Mocis diffluens (Guenée, 1852)
- Mocis diplocyma Hampson, 1913
- Mocis discios Kollar, 1844
- Mocis disseverans (Walker, 1858)
- Mocis dolosa (Butler, 1880) (= M. nigrisigna)
- Mocis dyndima (Stoll, 1782) (= M. dindyma, M. teligera)
- Mocis escondida (Schaus, 1901)
- Mocis frugalis (Fabricius, 1775)
- Mocis guenei (Möschler, 1880)
- Mocis incurvalis Schaus, 1923
- Mocis inferna (Leech, 1900)
- Mocis kagoshimaensis Kishida, 2010
- Mocis latipes (Guenée, 1852) (= M. collata, M. delinquens, M. exscindens, M. indentata, M. subtilis)
- Mocis laxa (Walker, 1858) (= M. pavona)
- Mocis marcida (Guenée, 1852)
- Mocis mayeri (Boisduval, 1833) (= M. associata, M. diffundens, M. inconcisa, M. jugalis, M. pellita, M. subaenescens)
- Mocis mutuaria (Walker, 1858) (= M. insulsa, M. judicans, M. nigrimacula, M. torpida)
- Mocis paraguayica Hampson, 1913
- Mocis persinuosa (Hampson, 1910)
- Mocis phasianoides (Guenee, 1852)
- Mocis propugnata (Leech, 1900)
- Mocis proverai Zilli, 2000
- Mocis ramifera Hampson, 1913
- Mocis repanda (Fabricius, 1794)
- Mocis sobria (Möschler, 1880)
- Mocis texana (Morrison, 1875)
- Mocis trifasciata (Stephens, 1830) (= M. demonstrans, M. discrepans)
- Mocis undata (Fabricius, 1775)
- Mocis undifera Hampson, 1913
- Mocis vitiensis Hampson, 1913
- Mocis xylomiges (Snellen, 1880)

== Status unclear ==
- Mocis punctularis, described as Noctua punctularis Hübner, [1808] from Europe.

== Former species ==
- Mocis bifasciata (Inoue & Sugi, 1961) (Melapia)
- Mocis munda (Walker, 1865)
