= Platypria moluccana =

Scientific classification
- Kingdom: Animalia
- Phylum: Arthropoda
- Clade: Pancrustacea
- Class: Insecta
- Order: Coleoptera
- Suborder: Polyphaga
- Infraorder: Cucujiformia
- Family: Chrysomelidae
- Genus: Platypria
- Species: P. moluccana

Binomial name
- Platypria moluccana Weise, 1922

Synonyms
- Platypria moluccana aitapennis Gressitt, 1957

Species of beetle

Platypria moluccana is a species of beetle of the family Chrysomelidae. It is found in Indonesia (Sulawesi) and New Guinea.

== Life history ==
No host plant has been documented for this species.
