= Platypria chiroptera =

Scientific classification
- Kingdom: Animalia
- Phylum: Arthropoda
- Class: Insecta
- Order: Coleoptera
- Suborder: Polyphaga
- Infraorder: Cucujiformia
- Family: Chrysomelidae
- Genus: Platypria
- Species: P. chiroptera

Binomial name
- Platypria chiroptera Gestro, 1899

Synonyms
- Platypria garthwaitei Bhasin, 1942

Species of beetle

Platypria chiroptera is a species of beetle of the family Chrysomelidae. It is found in Bhutan, China (Guangdong, Yunnan), India (Sikkim, Tamil Nadu) and Myanmar.

== Life history ==
The recorded host plant for this species is Zizyphus incurva.
