= Platypria fenestrata =

Scientific classification
- Kingdom: Animalia
- Phylum: Arthropoda
- Class: Insecta
- Order: Coleoptera
- Suborder: Polyphaga
- Infraorder: Cucujiformia
- Family: Chrysomelidae
- Genus: Platypria
- Species: P. fenestrata

Binomial name
- Platypria fenestrata Pic, 1924

Species of beetle

Platypria fenestrata is a species of beetle of the family Chrysomelidae. It is found in China (Fujian, Hunan, Guangdong, Yunnan), India and Vietnam.

== Life history ==
No host plant has been documented for this species.
