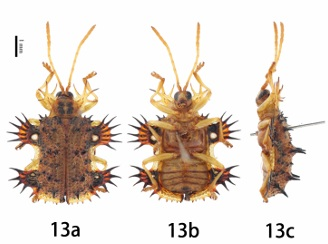

Scientific classification
- Kingdom: Animalia
- Phylum: Arthropoda
- Class: Insecta
- Order: Coleoptera
- Suborder: Polyphaga
- Infraorder: Cucujiformia
- Family: Chrysomelidae
- Genus: Platypria
- Species: P. aliena

Binomial name
- Platypria aliena Chen & Sun, 1962

= Platypria aliena =

Species of beetle

Platypria aliena is a species of beetle in the family Chrysomelidae. This species is found in China (Guangxi, Yunnan).

Adults have a yellow-brown body. There are four black spots on the disc. The elytral disc punctures are coarse and arranged in ten regular longitudinal rows.
