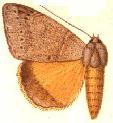

Scientific classification
- Kingdom: Animalia
- Phylum: Arthropoda
- Clade: Pancrustacea
- Class: Insecta
- Order: Lepidoptera
- Superfamily: Noctuoidea
- Family: Erebidae
- Genus: Mocis
- Species: M. bahamica

Binomial name
- Mocis bahamica Hampson, 1913

= Mocis bahamica =

Species of moth

Mocis bahamica is a moth of the family Erebidae. It is found on the Bahamas.
