= Pleurolobus =

Scientific classification
- Kingdom: Plantae
- Clade: Tracheophytes
- Clade: Angiosperms
- Clade: Eudicots
- Clade: Rosids
- Order: Fabales
- Family: Fabaceae
- Genus: Pleurolobus; J.St.-Hil. (1812)

Genus of plants

Pleurolobus is a genus of flowering plants in the pea family (Fabaceae). It includes six species, which range across sub-Saharan Africa, Yemen, the Indian Subcontinent, Southeast Asia, New Guinea, Micronesia, and Australia.

== Species ==
Six species are accepted:

- Pleurolobus flexuosus (Wall. ex Benth.) H.Ohashi & K.Ohashi – China (Sichuan), Myanmar, Thailand, and Cambodia
- Pleurolobus gangeticus (L.) J.St.-Hil. ex H.Ohashi & K.Ohashi – sub-Saharan Africa, Yemen, South and Southeast Asia, New Guinea, and Australia
- Pleurolobus lobatus (Schindl.) H.Ohashi & K.Ohashi – western Madagascar
- Pleurolobus pryonii (DC.) H.Ohashi & K.Ohashi – southern India and Sri Lanka
- Pleurolobus salicifolius (Poir.) H.Ohashi & K.Ohashi – Sub-saharan Africa, Madagascar, and Réunion
- Pleurolobus tanganyikensis (Baker) H.Ohashi & K.Ohashi – Tanzania to Angola and Mozambique
