= Platypria bakeri =

Scientific classification
- Kingdom: Animalia
- Phylum: Arthropoda
- Class: Insecta
- Order: Coleoptera
- Suborder: Polyphaga
- Infraorder: Cucujiformia
- Family: Chrysomelidae
- Genus: Platypria
- Species: P. bakeri

Binomial name
- Platypria bakeri Gestro, 1922

Species of beetle

Platypria bakeri is a species of beetle of the family Chrysomelidae. It is found in the Philippines (Mindanao, Negros, Sibuyan).

== Life history ==
No host plant has been documented for this species.
