= Mocis incurvalis =

Scientific classification
- Domain: Eukaryota
- Kingdom: Animalia
- Phylum: Arthropoda
- Class: Insecta
- Order: Lepidoptera
- Superfamily: Noctuoidea
- Family: Erebidae
- Genus: Mocis
- Species: M. incurvalis

Binomial name
- Mocis incurvalis Schaus, 1923

Species of moth

Mocis incurvalis is a species of moth of the family Erebidae. It is found on the Galápagos Islands.
