= Mocis dolosa =

Scientific classification
- Domain: Eukaryota
- Kingdom: Animalia
- Phylum: Arthropoda
- Class: Insecta
- Order: Lepidoptera
- Superfamily: Noctuoidea
- Family: Erebidae
- Genus: Mocis
- Species: M. dolosa

Binomial name
- Mocis dolosa (Butler, 1880)

Synonyms
- Plecoptera dolosa Butler 1880; Remigia nigrisigna Leech, 1889

Species of moth

Mocis dolosa is a species of moth of the family Erebidae. It is found in China, Japan (Honshu) and Taiwan.
