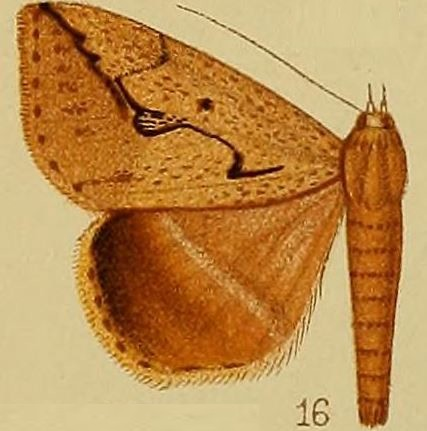
- Mocis persinuosa

Scientific classification
- Kingdom: Animalia
- Phylum: Arthropoda
- Class: Insecta
- Order: Lepidoptera
- Superfamily: Noctuoidea
- Family: Erebidae
- Genus: Mocis
- Species: M. persinuosa

Binomial name
- Mocis persinuosa (Hampson, 1910)

Synonyms
- Remigia persinuosa Hampson, 1910

= Mocis persinuosa =

Species of moth

Mocis persinuosa is a species of moth of the family Erebidae. It is found in the Democratic Republic of Congo (Katanga) and Zambia.
