= Mocis xylomiges =

Scientific classification
- Kingdom: Animalia
- Phylum: Arthropoda
- Class: Insecta
- Order: Lepidoptera
- Superfamily: Noctuoidea
- Family: Erebidae
- Genus: Mocis
- Species: M. xylomiges

Binomial name
- Mocis xylomiges (Snellen, 1880)

Synonyms
- Remigia xylomiges Snellen, 1880

Species of moth

Mocis xylomiges is a species of moth of the family Erebidae. It is found in Indonesia (Sulawesi, Java).
