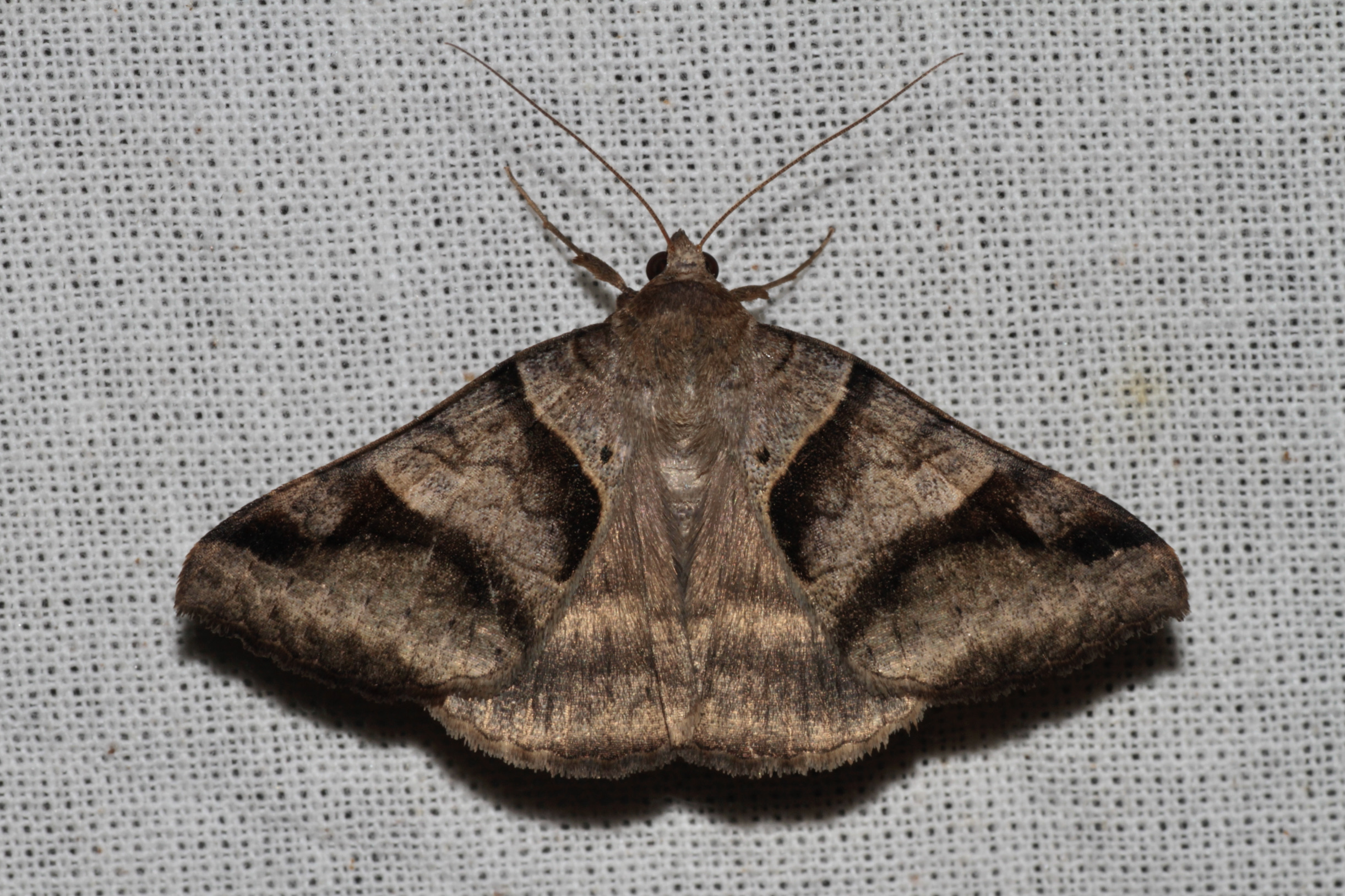
- From KwaZulu-Natal, South Africa.

Scientific classification
- Domain: Eukaryota
- Kingdom: Animalia
- Phylum: Arthropoda
- Class: Insecta
- Order: Lepidoptera
- Superfamily: Noctuoidea
- Family: Erebidae
- Genus: Mocis
- Species: M. mayeri

Binomial name
- Mocis mayeri (Boisduval, 1833)

Synonyms
- Ophiusa mayeri Boisduval, 1833; Remigia associata Walker, 1865; Hypaetra diffundens Walker, 1865; Remigia inconcisa Walker, 1865; Remigia jugalis Walker, 1858; Remigia pellita Guenee, 1852; Ophiusa subaenescens Walker, 1869

= Mocis mayeri =

Species of moth

Mocis mayeri is a species of moth in the family Erebidae first described by Jean Baptiste Boisduval in 1833. It has a wide range in Africa, which includes Cameroon, Cape Verde, the Comoros, the Democratic Republic of the Congo, Eritrea, Ghana, Kenya, Réunion, Madagascar, Malawi, Mauritius, Mozambique, Nigeria, Senegal, the Seychelles, Sierra Leone, South Africa, Sudan, Tanzania, the Gambia, Uganda, Zambia and Zimbabwe. It is also found in Saudi Arabia and Yemen.

== Etymology ==
Boisduval dedicated this species to Mr. Gustave Mayer from Mauritius.
