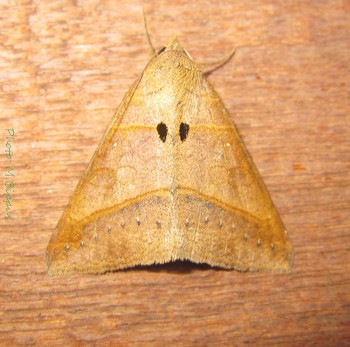

Scientific classification
- Kingdom: Animalia
- Phylum: Arthropoda
- Clade: Pancrustacea
- Class: Insecta
- Order: Lepidoptera
- Superfamily: Noctuoidea
- Family: Erebidae
- Genus: Mocis
- Species: M. conveniens

Binomial name
- Mocis conveniens (Walker, 1858)

Synonyms
- Remigia conveniens Walker, 1858; Remigia detersa Walker, 1865

= Mocis conveniens =

Species of moth

Mocis conveniens, the pale brown lines, is a moth of the family Erebidae.

It has a wide range in Africa south of the Sahara, from Ethiopia to Sierra Leone and from Sudan to South Africa. Its presence has also been stated in Yemen.

Its wingspan is around 40 millimetres (1.6 in).
