= Platypria funebris =

Scientific classification
- Kingdom: Animalia
- Phylum: Arthropoda
- Class: Insecta
- Order: Coleoptera
- Suborder: Polyphaga
- Infraorder: Cucujiformia
- Family: Chrysomelidae
- Genus: Platypria
- Species: P. funebris

Binomial name
- Platypria funebris Gestro, 1905

Synonyms
- Platypria ugandina Spaeth, 1937

Species of beetle

Platypria funebris is a species of beetle of the family Chrysomelidae. It is found in Angola, Cameroon, Congo, Guinea, Nigeria and Uganda.

== Life history ==
No host plant has been documented for this species.
