= Mocis camptogramma =

Scientific classification
- Domain: Eukaryota
- Kingdom: Animalia
- Phylum: Arthropoda
- Class: Insecta
- Order: Lepidoptera
- Superfamily: Noctuoidea
- Family: Erebidae
- Genus: Mocis
- Species: M. camptogramma

Binomial name
- Mocis camptogramma Dognin, 1919

Species of moth

Mocis camptogramma is a species of moth of the family Erebidae. It is found in Colombia.
