= Mocis mutuaria =

Scientific classification
- Kingdom: Animalia
- Phylum: Arthropoda
- Clade: Pancrustacea
- Class: Insecta
- Order: Lepidoptera
- Superfamily: Noctuoidea
- Family: Erebidae
- Genus: Mocis
- Species: M. mutuaria

Binomial name
- Mocis mutuaria (Walker, 1858)

Synonyms
- Remigia mutuaria Walker, 1858; Grammodes insulsa Wallengren, 1860; Ophiusa judicans Walker, 1858; Ophiusa nigrimacula Mabille, 1879; Remigia torpida Walker, 1865

Species of moth

Mocis mutuaria is a species of moth of the family Erebidae. It is found in the Democratic Republic of Congo (Kinshasa, East Kasai, Bas Congo, North Kivu, Katanga), Kenya, Madagascar, Malawi, Mozambique, Namibia, Nigeria, Rwanda, South Africa, Tanzania, Uganda, Zambia and Zimbabwe.
