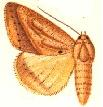

Scientific classification
- Kingdom: Animalia
- Phylum: Arthropoda
- Class: Insecta
- Order: Lepidoptera
- Superfamily: Noctuoidea
- Family: Erebidae
- Genus: Mocis
- Species: M. diplocyma

Binomial name
- Mocis diplocyma Hampson, 1913

= Mocis diplocyma =

Species of moth

Mocis diplocyma is a moth of the family Erebidae. It is found in South America, including Brazil and French Guiana.
