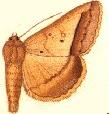

Scientific classification
- Kingdom: Animalia
- Phylum: Arthropoda
- Class: Insecta
- Order: Lepidoptera
- Superfamily: Noctuoidea
- Family: Erebidae
- Genus: Mocis
- Species: M. vitiensis

Binomial name
- Mocis vitiensis Hampson, 1913

= Mocis vitiensis =

Species of moth

Mocis vitiensis is a moth of the family Erebidae first described by George Hampson in 1913. It is found in Fiji.
