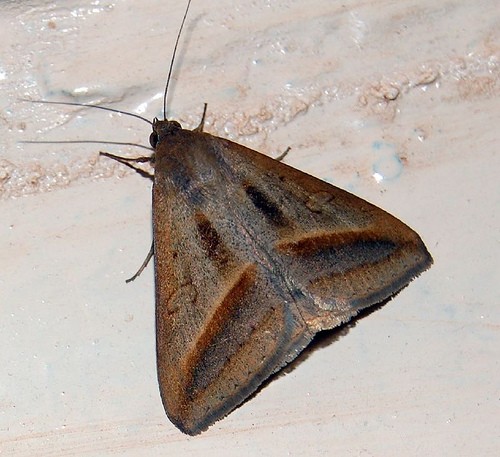
- Mocis frugalis, which is externally identical to Mocis proverai

Scientific classification
- Domain: Eukaryota
- Kingdom: Animalia
- Phylum: Arthropoda
- Class: Insecta
- Order: Lepidoptera
- Superfamily: Noctuoidea
- Family: Erebidae
- Genus: Mocis
- Species: M. proverai

Binomial name
- Mocis proverai Zilli, 2000

= Mocis proverai =

Species of moth

Mocis proverai is a moth of the family Erebidae first described by Alberto Zilli in 2000. It is found in Africa and the Arabian Peninsula.

In a recent publication Mocis frugalis, that is found in Asia and Australia was promoted to a separate species. Both species can be distinguished with microscopic examination of the genitalia.

The length of the forewings is 18–21 millimetres (0.71–0.83 in).

The larvae feed on various grasses like sugarcane and oat.
