= Mocis escondida =

Scientific classification
- Domain: Eukaryota
- Kingdom: Animalia
- Phylum: Arthropoda
- Class: Insecta
- Order: Lepidoptera
- Superfamily: Noctuoidea
- Family: Erebidae
- Genus: Mocis
- Species: M. escondida

Binomial name
- Mocis escondida (Schaus, 1901)

Synonyms
- Phurys escondida Schaus, 1901; Caenurgia escondida (Schaus, 1901)

Species of moth

Mocis escondida is a species of moth of the family Erebidae. It is found in Brazil (Parana).
