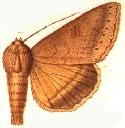

Scientific classification
- Kingdom: Animalia
- Phylum: Arthropoda
- Class: Insecta
- Order: Lepidoptera
- Superfamily: Noctuoidea
- Family: Erebidae
- Genus: Mocis
- Species: M. disseverans

Binomial name
- Mocis disseverans (Walker, 1858)

Synonyms
- Remigia disseverans Walker, 1858; Baratha acuta Walker, 1865; Mocis acuta (Walker, 1865); Remigia persubtilis Walker, 1858; Mocis persubtilis (Walker, 1858)

= Mocis disseverans =

Species of moth

Mocis disseverans, the yellow mocis moth, is a moth of the family Erebidae. It is found in the Caribbean and parts of the southern United States, including Mississippi, Florida and Texas.

The wingspan is about 40 millimetres (1.6 in).
