= Platypria decemspinosa =

Scientific classification
- Kingdom: Animalia
- Phylum: Arthropoda
- Class: Insecta
- Order: Coleoptera
- Suborder: Polyphaga
- Infraorder: Cucujiformia
- Family: Chrysomelidae
- Genus: Platypria
- Species: P. decemspinosa

Binomial name
- Platypria decemspinosa Kraatz, 1895

Synonyms
- Platypria clavareaui Weise, 1902; Platypria tuberculata Achard, 1917; Platypria decemspinosa detersa Uhmann, 1931

Species of beetle

Platypria decemspinosa is a species of beetle of the family Chrysomelidae. It is found in Angola, Cameroon, Congo, Guinea, Ivory Coast, Nigeria, Sudan, Togo and Uganda.

== Life history ==
No host plant has been documented for this species.
