= Mocis laxa =

Scientific classification
- Kingdom: Animalia
- Phylum: Arthropoda
- Class: Insecta
- Order: Lepidoptera
- Superfamily: Noctuoidea
- Family: Erebidae
- Genus: Mocis
- Species: M. laxa

Binomial name
- Mocis laxa (Walker, 1858)

Synonyms
- Phurys laxa Walker, 1858; Drasteria pavona Felder & Rogenhofer, 1874

Species of moth

Mocis laxa is a species of moth of the family Erebidae. It is found in China (Tibet, Qinghai), India (Sikkim) and Bangladesh.
