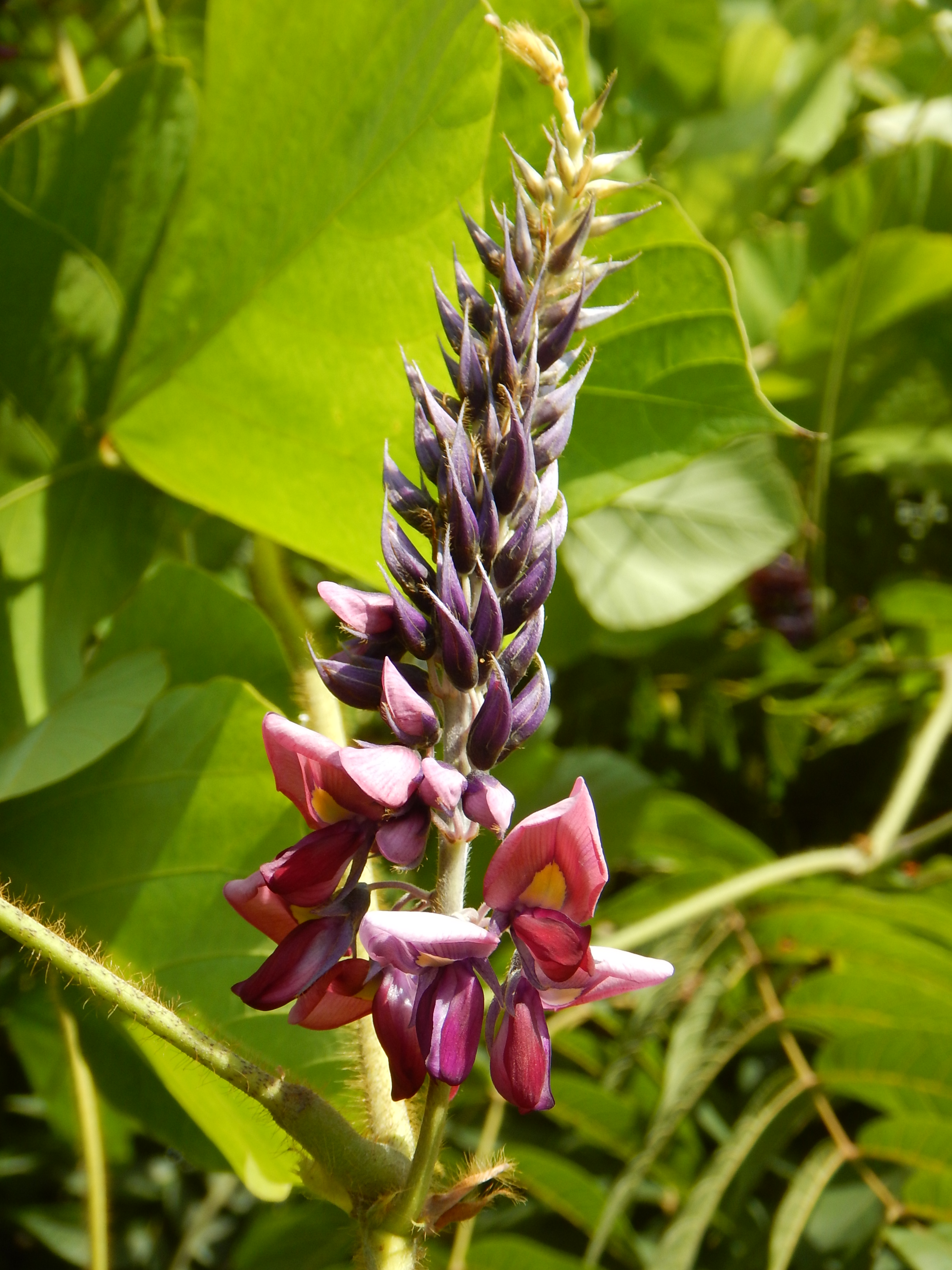
- Pueraria montana var. lobata

Scientific classification
- Kingdom: Plantae
- Clade: Tracheophytes
- Clade: Angiosperms
- Clade: Eudicots
- Clade: Rosids
- Order: Fabales
- Family: Fabaceae
- Subfamily: Faboideae
- Genus: Pueraria
- Species: P. montana

Binomial name
- Pueraria montana (Lour.) Merr.

Synonyms
- Dolichos montanus Lour.; Pueraria lobata var. montana (Lour.) Maesen

= Pueraria montana =

Species of legume

Pueraria montana, more commonly known as kudzu, is a species of plant in the botanical family Fabaceae. At least three sub-species (alternatively called varieties) are known. It is closely related to other species in the genus Pueraria (P. edulis and P. phaseoloides) and the common name is used for all of these species and hybrids between them. The morphological differences between them are subtle, they can breed with each other, and it appears that introduced kudzu populations in the United States have ancestry from more than one of the species.

== Description ==
It is a seasonal climbing plant, growing high where suitable surfaces (trees, cliffs, walls) are available, and also growing as ground cover where there are no vertical surfaces. It is a perennial vine with tuberous roots and rope-like, dark brown stems up to 20 m (66 ft) long. It grows up to 20 metres (66 ft) per year and can achieve a height of 30 metres (98 ft). It has markedly hairy herbaceous stems.

Pueraria montana is native to East Asia, primarily subtropical and temperate regions of China, Japan, and Korea, with trifoliate leaves composed of three leaflets. Each leaflet is large and ovate with two to three lobes each and hair on the underside. The species can fix atmospheric nitrogen, which can supply up to 95% of leaf nitrogen to the plant in poor soils. Along the vines are nodes, points at which stems or tendrils can propagate to increase support and attach to structures. As a twining vine, kudzu uses stems or tendrils that can extend from any node on the vine to attach to and climb most surfaces. In addition, the nodes of the kudzu vine have the ability to root when exposed to soil, further anchoring the vine to the ground. The roots are tuberous and are high in starch and water content, and the twining of the plant allows for less carbon concentration in the construction of woody stems and greater concentration in roots, which aids root growth. The roots can account for up to 40% of total plant biomass.

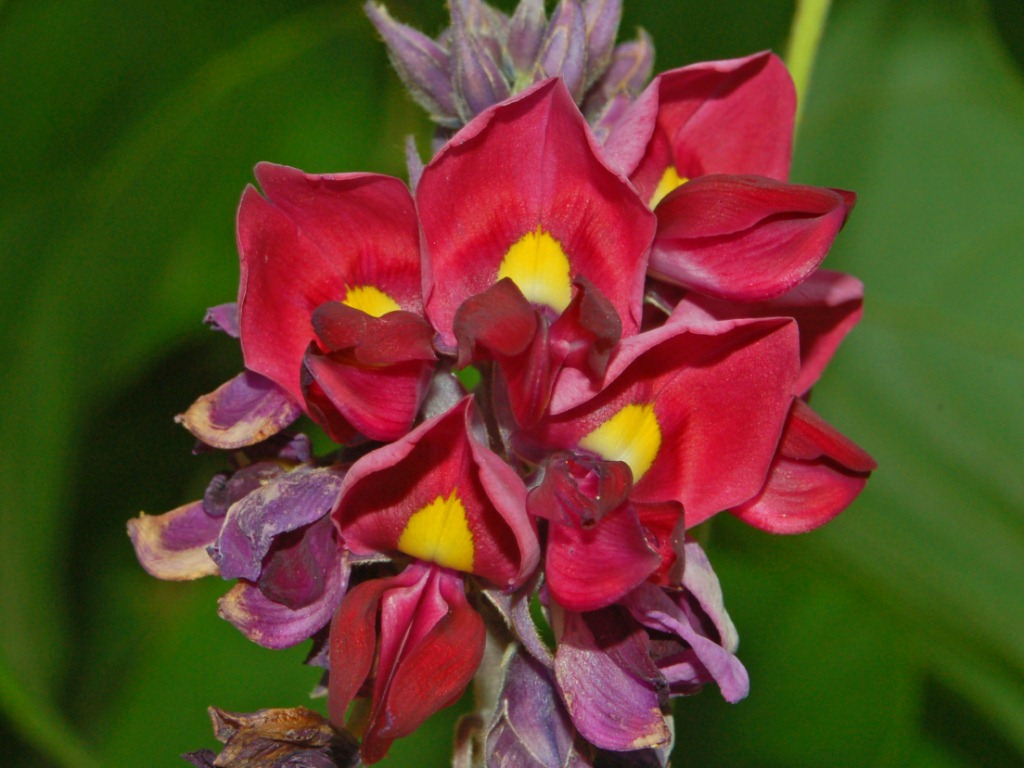
Close-up on flowers of Pueraria montana var. lobata

Flowers are reddish-purple and yellow, fragrant, similar to pea flowers, about 20–25 millimetres (3/4–1 in) wide and are produced at the leaf axis in elongated racemes about 20 centimetres (8 in) long. The flowering period extends from July through October. The fruit is a flat hairy pod about 8 centimetres (3 in) long with three seeds.

Kudzu's primary method of reproduction is asexual vegetative spread (cloning) which is aided by the ability to root wherever a stem is exposed to soil. For sexual reproduction, kudzu is entirely dependent on pollinators.

Although kudzu prefers forest regrowth and edge habitats with high sun exposure, the plant can survive in full sun or partial shade. These attributes of kudzu made it attractive as an ornamental plant for shading porches in the Southeastern United States, but they facilitated the growth of kudzu as it became a “structural parasite” of the southern states, enveloping entire structures when untreated and often referred to as “the vine that ate the south”.

== Subspecies and varieties ==
- Pueraria montana var. chinensis (Ohwi) Sanjappa & Pradeep
- Pueraria montana var. lobata (Willd.) Sanjappa & Pradeep
- Pueraria montana var. thomsonii (Benth.) Wiersema ex D.B. Ward

== Taxonomy ==
The Latin specific epithet montana refers to mountains or coming from mountains.

== Uses ==
Kudzu has been referred to as a "quasi-wild" species, since it has been farmed and selectively bred by humans for millennia in its native range, but cultivated strains have never become isolated from wild populations, resulting in repeated interchanges between wild and farmed kudzu. As a result, the gene pool of kudzu is diverse, vigorous, and strongly influenced by the plant's relationship with humans. The main uses of kudzu are for food, for fiber, and as a medicinal plant; it is also used to make paper, for basketry, and as a food source for livestock.

The starchy root of kudzu has been used for food in China since before 540 CE, with specific cultivars bred for this purpose, and often sustained Chinese people during famines that occurred throughout history. Kudzu starch is used as a thickening or gelling agent similar to arrowroot, tapioca or potato starch, and has many alleged benefits as a health food. Kudzu is still utilized for food in China, Japan, and Korea. Kudzu starch is an important component of many Japanese confections and sweets, valued for its ability to set firmly with a fine, translucent appearance. It is also turned into flour and can be used to make noodles. Kudzu is furthermore considered an important medicinal plant, and is sometimes sold as a supplement in health food stores.

Kudzu cloth is called "ko-pu" and archaeological records indicate that ko-pu was used in China at least 6,000 years ago. From the Zhou dynasty to the early twentieth century, kudzu was one of three major textile materials used in China, with the others being silk and ramie. Kudzu textiles were inexpensive and widespread, and formed such a major part of commerce that the Zhou dynasty had a specific office for dealing with kudzu-related affairs. In Japan, the earliest evidence for kudzu cloth dates back to 300-538 CE, and it continued to be used into the Edo period. Kudzu fiber is a bast fiber, like linen or hemp. To obtain the bast fibers, the new young vines are harvested in summer and boiled, then left to be fermented by the action of naturally occurring bacteria in mounds of grass until the outer bark becomes slimy and can be washed off in running water.

In 2023, kudzu was used to develop a biodegradable alternative to plastic food packaging.

== Invasive species ==
The natural range of Pueraria montana can be found in India, Myanmar, Indochina, China, Korea, Japan, Thailand, Malaysia, the Pacific Islands, and in north Australia. In its native habitat, it and its closely related species occur across wide areas; the species have diverged genetically due to vicariance. Its invasiveness can be attributed to similarities between both native and newly invaded niches, effectively expanding its habitable range into areas with climates it may not be able to endure otherwise.

Some researchers argue that, because of the close relationship shared between kudzu and humans since the Neolithic, human harvesting is the main ecological control mechanism that keeps kudzu in check in its natural range. In Eastern Asia, where kudzu is a valuable plant with many benefits to humans, many millennia of human selection and cultivation have facilitated the spread of the plant to new areas and resulted in a broad, adaptable gene pool. However, although humans have provided benefits to kudzu, harvesting the vines and roots regularly would decrease the plant's competitiveness and aggressive growth, meaning humans have essentially served as a biological control for kudzu.

Like other exotic species, the introduction to other areas is due to human actions. Seeds are spread by mammals and birds. Kudzu are plants adapted to drought. Only above ground portions are damaged by frost; thick storage roots grow as deep as 1 metre. It forms new perennial root crowns from stem nodes touching the ground.

The ecological requirements of the species are those of the subtropical and temperate habitat areas.

In Europe, Pueraria montana grows in several places in the warm regions of Switzerland and Italy near Lake Maggiore and Lake Lugano.

During World War II, kudzu was introduced to Vanuatu and Fiji by United States Armed Forces to serve as camouflage for equipment. It is now a major weed there.

Pueraria montana is also becoming a problem in Queensland.

In the United States, Pueraria montana is extensively reported in the coastal states from eastern Texas to Florida, North to Maryland, as well as inland in Arkansas, Kentucky, Missouri, Pennsylvania, Tennessee, Washington, D.C., and West Virginia. Since 2004, Kudzu has moved farther North along the Ohio River, appearing in Illinois, Indiana, and Ohio. Of all affected states, three in the southeast have the heaviest infestations: Georgia, Alabama, and Mississippi.

== Effects on biodiversity ==
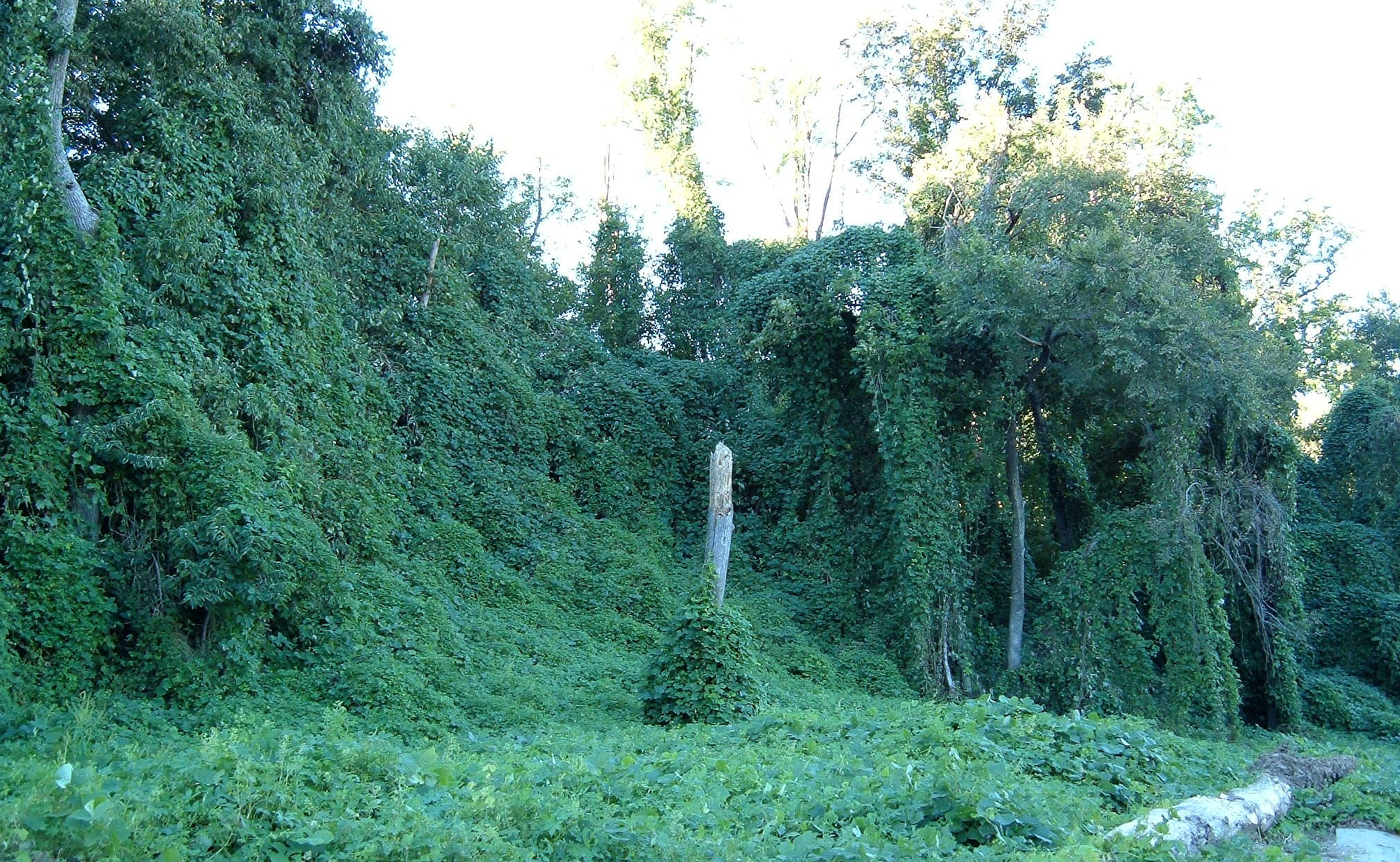
Pueraria montana (Kudzu) growing over trees in a forest of Georgia

Due to the aggressive, climbing nature of P. montana it often causes shading and death of native vegetation, resulting in a monoculture of P. montana. As P. montana spreads, it shades and crushes its competitors with its weight, eliminating everything in its path. As a result of growing over native plants and trees, it blocks their access of vital resources such as sunlight, killing off young vegetation. These result in dramatic reductions in native biodiversity at the local level.

Other than the loss of biodiversity of plant species, P. montana may have a negative effect on animals. Many plant species that are suppressed by P. montana because of its uncontrolled and rapid growth negatively impacts some wildlife animals that have specific mutualisms or feeding relationships with these plant species. This potentially could lead to the death of certain animal species, specifically herbivores, that depend on some vegetation as a resource for both food and shelter. These are important factors that lead to habitat destruction and reduction in animal biodiversity.

== Impacts of global changes ==
Changes in the global environment such as higher CO_{2} levels, higher temperatures, greater rates of nitrogen deposition, and greater fragmentation of natural habitats are predicted to increase the spread of P. montana.

=== Carbon dioxide ===
Kudzu is highly responsive to increased CO_{2} levels as it results in maximal leaf expansion, increase in leaf size, and an overall 12% increase in leaf production. In turn, the plant has higher turgor pressure which results in the improvements in its growth potential. As the atmospheric CO_{2} concentration continues to rise, it is possible for the potential enhancement of P. montana’s invasiveness.

=== Temperature ===
With global warming, overnight temperatures tend to increase. Data collected in the United States over the past few decades showed a reduction in frost days, an earlier date for the last freeze in spring, and a later date for the first freeze in fall. These favour the spread of P. montana.

The northward distribution of P. montana is hypothesized to be limited by low temperatures. Cold temperatures cause their leaves to be killed off and their leaf expansion to be lagged. However, with the continuous rise in global temperature, it is predicted that P. montana will rapidly spread northward as a result of the increased number of warmer days.
