= Mocis guenei =

Scientific classification
- Domain: Eukaryota
- Kingdom: Animalia
- Phylum: Arthropoda
- Class: Insecta
- Order: Lepidoptera
- Superfamily: Noctuoidea
- Family: Erebidae
- Genus: Mocis
- Species: M. guenei

Binomial name
- Mocis guenei (Möschler, 1880)

Synonyms
- Remigia guenei Möschler, 1880

Species of moth

Mocis guenei is a species of moth of the family Erebidae. It is found in Suriname.
