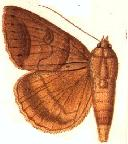

Scientific classification
- Kingdom: Animalia
- Phylum: Arthropoda
- Class: Insecta
- Order: Lepidoptera
- Superfamily: Noctuoidea
- Family: Erebidae
- Genus: Mocis
- Species: M. antillesia

Binomial name
- Mocis antillesia Hampson, 1913

Synonyms
- Remigia antillesia (Hampson, 1913)

= Mocis antillesia =

Species of moth

Mocis antillesia is a moth of the family Erebidae. It is found on the Lesser Antilles, Bahamas and British Virgin Islands.
