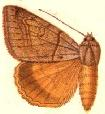

Scientific classification
- Kingdom: Animalia
- Phylum: Arthropoda
- Class: Insecta
- Order: Lepidoptera
- Superfamily: Noctuoidea
- Family: Erebidae
- Genus: Mocis
- Species: M. cubana

Binomial name
- Mocis cubana Hampson, 1913

= Mocis cubana =

Species of moth

Mocis cubana is a moth of the family Erebidae. It is found in Cuba and was first reported from the Florida Keys by John B. Heppner in 2003.

The wingspan is about 37 millimetres (1.5 in).
