= Haymondia =

Scientific classification
- Kingdom: Plantae
- Clade: Tracheophytes
- Clade: Angiosperms
- Clade: Eudicots
- Clade: Rosids
- Order: Fabales
- Family: Fabaceae
- Genus: Haymondia; A.N.Egan & B.Pan (2015)
- Species: H. wallichii

Binomial name
- Haymondia wallichii (DC.) A.N.Egan & B.Pan (2015)

Synonyms
- Dolichos frutescens Buch.-Ham. ex D.Don (1825); Glycine dilecta Wall. ex Voigt (1845); Neustanthus wallichii (DC.) Benth. (1852); Pueraria composita Graham ex Wall. (1831), not validly publ.; Pueraria wallichii DC. (1825); Pueraria wallichii var. composita Benth. (1867)

Genus of plants

Haymondia is a monotypic genus of flowering plants belonging to the family Fabaceae. The only species is Haymondia wallichii. It is a scrambling shrub with a native range from Nepal to China (Yunnan) and Indo-China.
