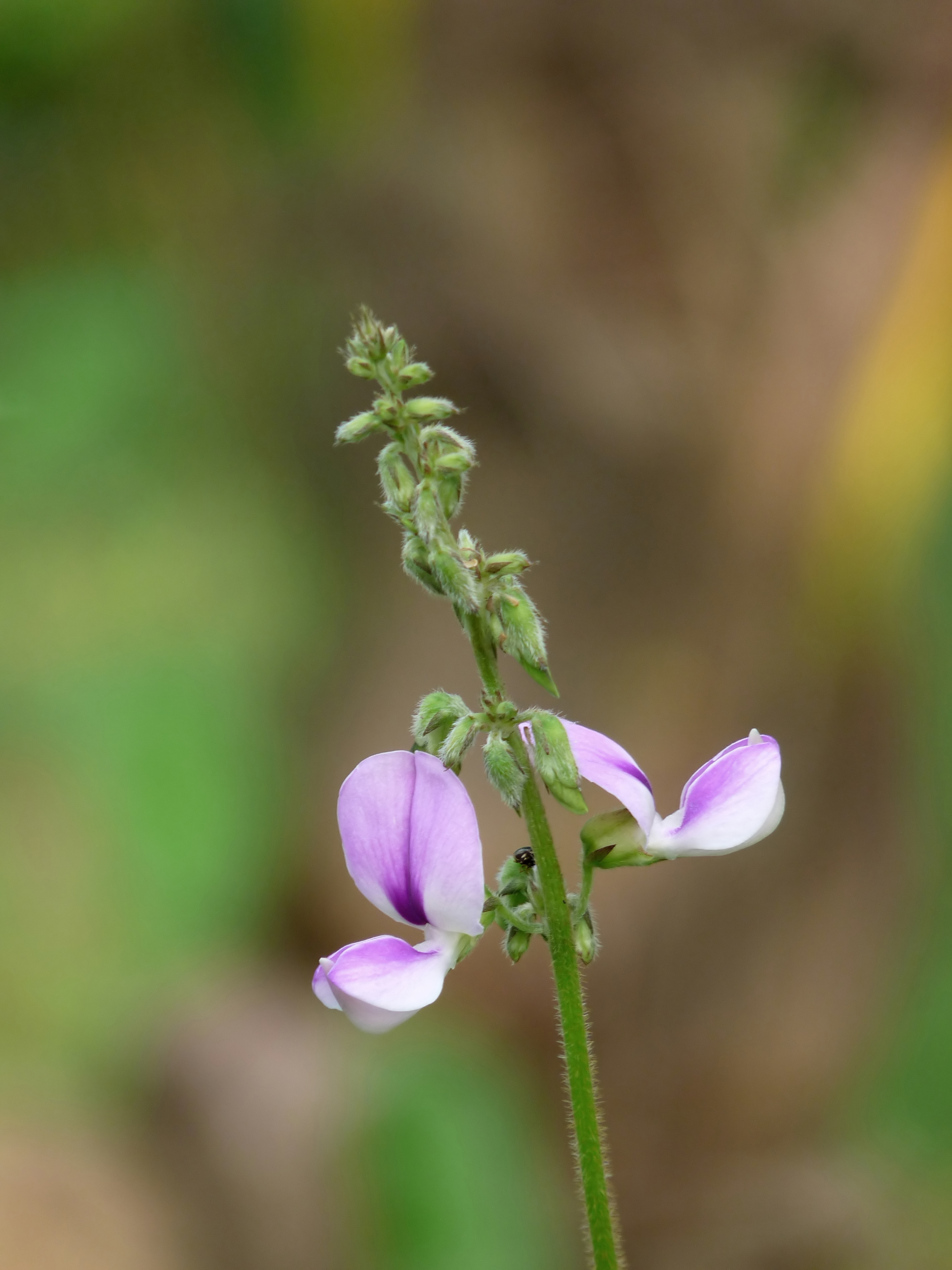
- Pueraria phaseoloides

Scientific classification
- Kingdom: Plantae
- Clade: Tracheophytes
- Clade: Angiosperms
- Clade: Eudicots
- Clade: Rosids
- Order: Fabales
- Family: Fabaceae
- Subfamily: Faboideae
- Clade: Millettioids
- Tribe: Phaseoleae
- Subtribe: Glycininae
- Genus: Pueraria; DC. (1825)

Species
- 18; see text

Synonyms
- Bujacia E.Mey. (1836); Glycine L. (1753), nom. rej.; Zeydora Lour. ex Gomes Mach. (1868)

= Pueraria =

Genus of legumes

Pueraria is a genus of 15–20 species of legumes native to south, east, and southeast Asia and to New Guinea and northern Australia. The best known member is kudzu, also called Japanese arrowroot. The genus is named after 19th century Swiss botanist Marc Nicolas Puerari.

Plants in the genus are lianas, shrubs, or climbing herbs, usually with large tuberous roots. Typical habitats include seasonally-dry tropical and subtropical forest, rain forest, forest margins, and scrub vegetation, often on limestone outcrops and in rocky areas.

The genus, as traditionally circumscribed, is polyphyletic, with different species being more related to other species in the tribe Phaseoleae. Current research, reproduced below, splits the genus into five clades, one of which defines the current monophyletic genus.

== Species ==
The genus Pueraria is highly polyphyletic; the below list is divided by clade following the result of A.N.Egan & B.Pan (2016). In 2015, the authors validly published their proposal in Phytotaxa. As of February 2022, Kew Plants of the World Online database accepts these names.

=== Pueraria sensu stricto ===
Pueraria sensu stricto includes the vast majority of species in the genus. They fall into a single clade sister to or containing Nogra.

- P. alopecuroides Craib
- P. calycina Franch.
- P. candollei Benth.
- P. edulis Pamp.
- P. imbricata Maesen
- P. lacei Craib
- P. mirifica Airy Shaw & Suvat. (= P. candollei var. mirifica in Egan)
- P. montana (Lour.) Merr. – US invasive population comes from a hybrid of more than one of the subspecies.
  - Pueraria montana var. chinensis (Ohwi) Sanjappa & Pradeep (= P. chinensis, although ILDS and the plant list instead consider P. thomsonii the synonym)
  - Pueraria montana var. lobata (Willd.) Sanjappa & Pradeep (= P. lobata)
  - Pueraria montana var. thomsonii (Benth.) Wiersema ex D.B. Ward (= P. thomsonii, missing in ILDS)
- P. pulcherrima (Koord.) Koord.-Schum.
- P. sikkimensis Prain
- P. tuberosa (Roxb.ex Willd.) DC. – type species

=== Provisionally retained ===
The following are not included in the 2016 study due to insufficient material for sequencing. They are accepted by POWO.

- P. bella Prain: conflicting proposals assigning either to the main clade or to Neonotonia (morphology).
- P. bouffordii H. Ohashi: presumably in the main clade (morphology).
- P. grandiflora Bo Pan & Bing Liu: presumably in the main clade (morphology).
- P. xyzhuii H. Ohashi & Iokawa: presumably in the main clade (morphology).

The following are not included in Egan et al. 2016 for other reasons, but are accepted by Kew POWO:

- P. garhwalensis L.R.Dangwal & D.S.Rawat: excluded per van der Maesen (2002)
- P. neocaledonica Harms: not mentioned

=== Former members ===
The rest of the genus fall into four clades, sorted by distance from the main clade:

- Neustanthus Benth. – sister to Sinodolichos
  - P. phaseoloides (Roxb.) Benth. → N. phaseoloides (Roxb.) Benth.
    P. edulis, P. montana, and N. phaseoloides make up what is known as kudzu. The morphological differences between these species are subtle.
    - N. phaseoloides var. javanicus (= P. javanica (Benth.) Benth.)
    - N. phaseoloides var. phaseoloides
    - N. phaseoloides var. subspicatus
- Teyleria
  - P. stricta Kurz → T. stricta
- Toxicopueraria A.N.Egan & B.Pan – sister to Cologania
  - P. peduncularis Grah. → T. peduncularis
  - P. yunnanensis Franchet.→ T. yunnanensis
- Haymondia A.N.Egan & B.Pan – notably lies out of Glycininae near Kennediinae; known for a long time to be misplaced
  - P. wallichii DC. → H. wallichii

The following names are not accepted even before Egan 2016 but have seen valid publication:

- P. omeiensis Wang et Tang – P. montana: unaccepted name after Mount Omei.
- P. stracheyi Baker → Apios carnea (Wall.) Benth. ex Baker.
- P. maclurei (F. P. Metcalf) F. J. Herm. → Sinodolichos lagopus – still accepted by WFO
