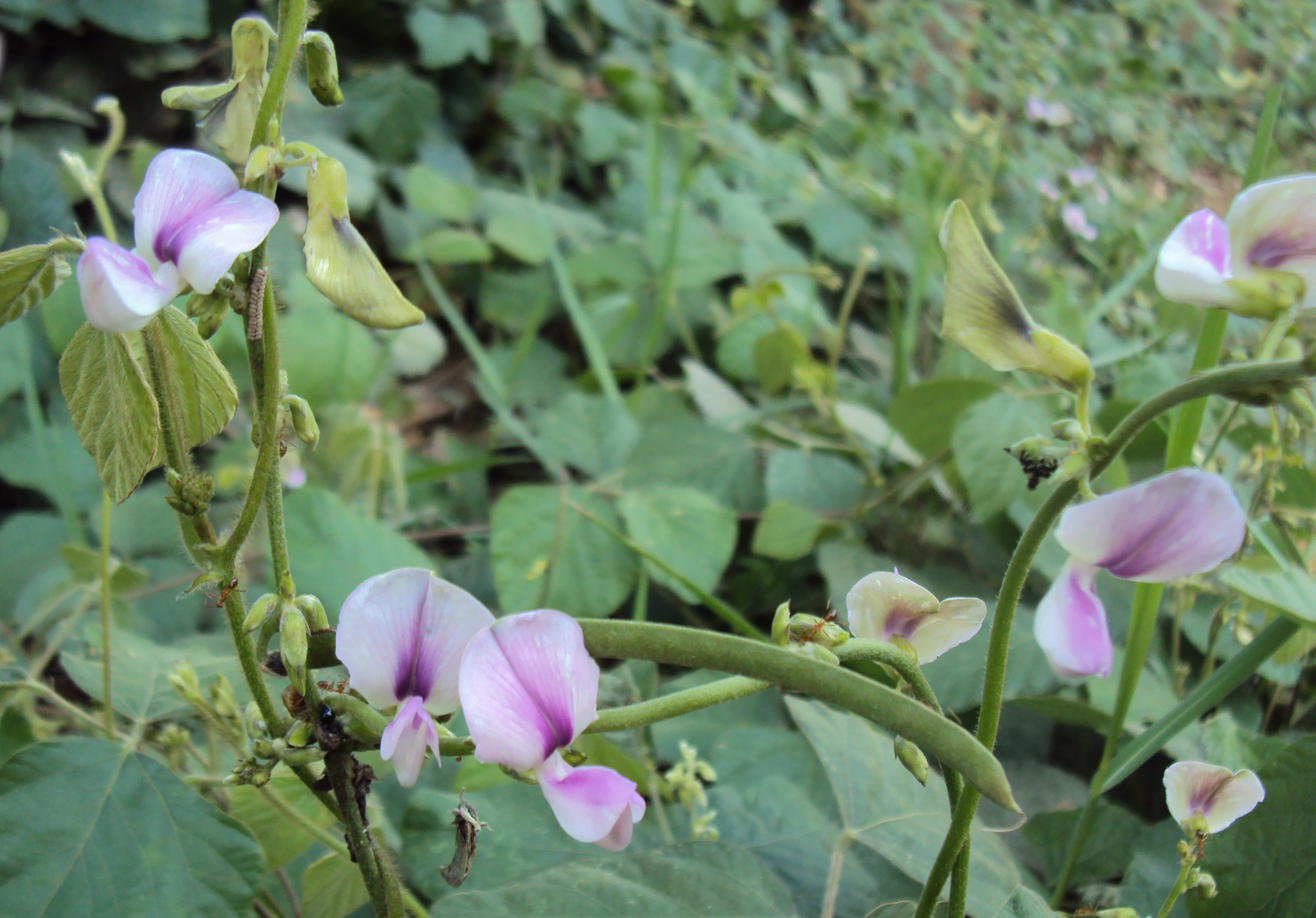
- Flowers of Neustanthus phaseoloides

Scientific classification
- Kingdom: Plantae
- Clade: Tracheophytes
- Clade: Angiosperms
- Clade: Eudicots
- Clade: Rosids
- Order: Fabales
- Family: Fabaceae
- Genus: Neustanthus; Benth.
- Species: N. phaseoloides

Binomial name
- Neustanthus phaseoloides (Roxb.) Benth.

Synonyms
- Pueraria phaseoloides (Roxb.) Benth.; Neustanthus javanicus Benth.; Neustanthus sericans Miq.; Pachyrhizus mollis Hassk.; Pueraria javanica (Benth.) Benth.

= Neustanthus =

Species of legume

Neustanthus is a monotypic genus of flowering plants belonging to the pea family Fabaceae and its tribe Phaseoleae. The only species is Neustanthus phaseoloides, called tropical kudzu. This species is a forage crop and cover crop used in the tropics. It is known as puero in Australia and tropical kudzu in most tropical regions.

It is related to the genus Pueraria and artificial hybridization with P. montana var. lobata has been achieved. Prior to 2016, the accepted name was Pueraria phaseoloides.

== Name ==
The name kudzu does not only refer to N. phaseoloides. It is also used for its close relatives Pueraria montana and P. edulis. N. phaseoloides has different scientific synonyms. Depending on the authors, it is possible that two different variation are citied: N. phaseoloides var. phaseoloides and the bigger and larger N. phaseoloides var. javanica.

=== Subtaxa ===
The following varieties are accepted:

- Neustanthus phaseoloides var. javanicus (Benth.) A.N.Egan & B.Pan – formerly Pueraria javanica (Benth.) Benth.
- Neustanthus phaseoloides var. phaseoloides
- Neustanthus phaseoloides var. subspicatus (Benth.) A.N.Egan & B.Pan

== Distribution ==
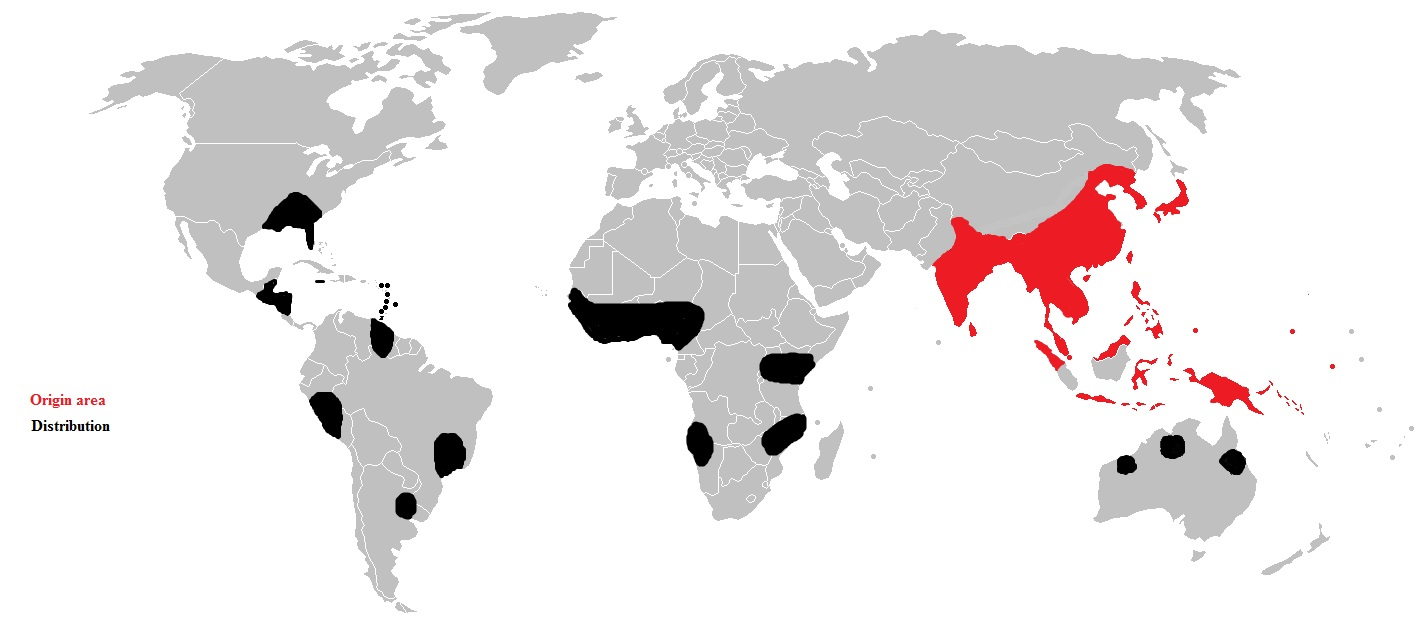
Distribution of Neustanthus phaseoloides.

Neustanthus phaseoloides is indigenous in east or in southeast Asia. Today it has been introduced and naturalized in a broad range of other wet tropical environments: Africa, Americas and Australia. N. phaseoloides prefers to is grow in ruderal situations, such as plantations of cocoa or banana, at low altitudes (often under 600 metres above sea level) in wet evergreen or monsoon forests. N. phaseoloides is capable to growth in a large soil spectrum. Acid soils are not a problem and the pH tolerance is between 4.3 and 8.

== Description ==
Neustanthus phaseoloides is a deep rooting perennial herb, building a subtuberus. This device allows to resist waterlogged soils and short periods of drought. The above ground structure can grow up to 30 cm at day and often the steams can reach 20 m of elongation. N. phaseoloides is a twiner and climbs over other plants or anthropogenic objects. The leaves are large and trifoliate, typical for Leguminosae. The single leaflets can have an oval or triangular shape. Their dimensions can vary from 2 x 2 cm to 20 x 15 cm. The growing season goes from early spring to late fall in the subtropics and year-round in the tropics. Flowers are typical for the Fabales order. The colour ranges from mauve to purple and the dimensions are small and occur in scattered pairs on a raceme. Mature pods of N. phaseoloides show a black color and hair coat. They are straight or slightly curved and can be sized from 4 to 11 cm. Each pod contains 10-20 seeds. They have a particular squarish form with rounded corner (3 x 2 mm) and have also a black or brown colour.

=== Biology ===
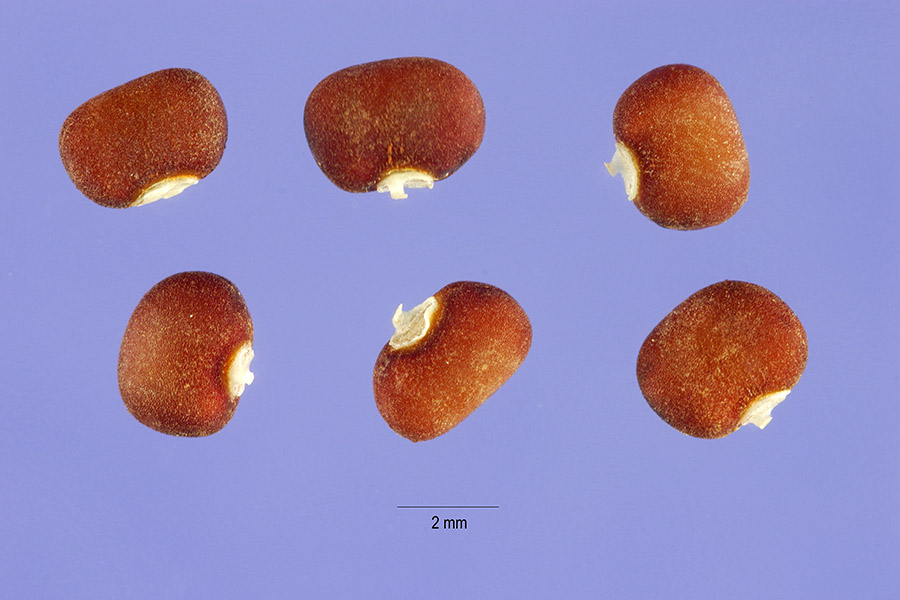
Neustanthus phaseoloides seeds

The reproduction of Neustanthus phaseoloides can be vegetative or generative. N. phaseoloides shows an epigeal germination. The growth from seedling is in the first three or four months moderately vigorous. Contrarily to Pueraria montana var. lobata, N. phaseoloides does not have a dormant period. Successful growth was observed with a temperature between 22.1 and 27.4 °C, colder environment drastically reducing the development. After establishment, the plant starts to climb and build tangled mats of over a half meter. It was found that the production of seeds is improved by the possibility to climb. The relatively reduced shade tolerance of N. phaseoloides explain of this phenomenon.

Developed plants can also reproduce vegetatively. When vines are in contact with the soil, a new plant can grow from the nodes. This enlarges and forms new crowns with 3 -4 vines each. The conjunction with the parental plant is kept until the second growing season.

=== Genetics ===
Neustanthus phaseoloides is a diploid species. Depending on the source, the cytological characteristics show different results. The diploid number is probably 20 or 22. Some authors found also 24 chromosomes, this results is disputable.

=== Invasiveness ===
Neustanthus phaseoloides can become an invasive species when growing in tropical and subtropical habitats due to its fast growth, its wide seed distribution and its ability to fully cover other plants.

== Use ==
Neustanthus phaseoloides is grown as a cover crop (often with centro and calopo) in oil palm, rubber and coconut. The main advantages of using N. phaseoloides as a cover crop is the comparable high nitrogen accumulation and the improvement of the soil structure due to its deep rooting system. It can be used as a grazed forage crop and as green manure in crop rotations. Furthermore, it can be used to prevent soil erosion on sloppy soils. In Africa it is mainly used as cover crops in plantations whereas in tropical America, south-east Asia it is used as forage crop in mixtures and as cover crops. In Malaysia its extracts are used as medicine.

== Production ==
As N. phaseoloides is used as cover crop or as part of a mixture in pastures. Its production methods differ for both uses.

=== Propagation ===
Neustanthus phaseoloides is mainly propagated by drill sowing, where the distance between the drill rows is set to one metre. Furthermore, it can be hand planted or propagated by cutting. For increased germination and sanitary protection a hot water treatment (50 °C – 70 °C) can be applied. For soil cover or green manure use, N. phaseoloides is normally sown with a sowing density of 4.0 kg seed per ha, which is similar to 32 – 35 seeds per m^{2}, depending on the seed weight. When sowing pastures with a high weed pressure the number of seed can reach up to 70 seeds per m^{2} when there is a high weed pressure. When used in mixture N. phaseoloides is sown with a density of 1.5 - 2.0 kg per ha, which is equal to 12 – 18 seeds per m^{2}.

=== Nutrient requirement ===
The nutrient requirement of N. phaseoloides was first discussed by Dirven and Ehrencron in 1969. They found that good root development is attained under presence of P, Mg and Ca. Furthermore, they found the highest yield reduction under low P conditions followed by low Ca and Mg conditions whereas at low K, N and Na conditions yield was 50 percent lower. As a legume N. phaseoloides can compensate for low N conditions by increasing symbiotic nitrogen fixation. This also explains its well response to added P. On poor soils 100 kg of P_{2}O_{5} showed to bring benefital effect on the yield. The Inoculation of the seeds before sowing with Bradyrhizobium is advised for primary cultivated areas.

=== Diseases ===
There are some diseases present in N. phaseoloides. However, the severity of this diseases is on N. phaseoloides is low. The most important diseases are leaf spot (Pseudocercospora puerariae) and anthracnose (Colletotrichum gloeosporioides). They mainly appear under prolonged humid and warm conditions.

=== Water stress ===
Neustanthus phaseoloides is not drought tolerant. However it was reported that N. phaseoloides can survive short dry periods. This drought susceptibility is a problem as soon as grown in Tropical savanna climate with wet and dry seasons.

=== Management when used in mixtures ===
The management of N. phaseoloides grown in mixtures is challenging. N. phaseoloides often shows a high palatability compared to tropical grasses; hence under high grazing pressure it can disappear. If the grazing pressure is too low it can dominate due to its fast growth and its climbing ability. Its growth is also affected by the other species in the mixture. It grows well with ori, molasses, guinea and napier grass. However it cannot persist when grown with Brachiaria decumbens or pangola grass.

=== Harvesting ===
When used as a forage crop N. phaseoloides is mainly grazed. Cutting for hay, silage, barn betting is possible as well. When used as a green manure kudzu is directly incorporated into the soil. Harvesting of the seeds can be done by hand or with harvesting machines. When grown as monoculture the yield of N. phaseoloides can reach up to 10 tons dry matter per ha, whereas the biggest proportion of the yield is produced during wet season. The yield of mixtures with N. phaseoloides can reach up to 23 tons per ha when grown under optimal conditions. The seed yield can reach up to 330 kg per ha under optimal conditions. The optimum seed yield can only be attained when harvested by hand. If the seeds are harvested with a machine the harvested yield it is noticeably lower. This is due to uneven maturity of the seed pots and therefore high shattering.

== Breeding ==
There is no breeding done with N. phaseoloides. However, there is some seed traded especially in Australia. There is one germplasm collection in Columbia (CIAT) and one in Australia (CSIRO).

== Nutrient Content ==
Neustanthus phaseoloides shows a high protein content in the seeds (12-20%). Also the nutrient, protein (3.8%) and sugar (7.3%) content of the whole fresh plant (green part) is very high. This is especially true when compared to other tropical plant species. Due to its rich nutrient content N. phaseoloides has a good feeding value. 100g of N. phaseoloides contain 1880 kJ of energy, of which a big share is available as metabolic energy.

== Differentiation from Pueraria ==
Neustanthus phaseoloides is similar to its close relative P. montana and P. edulis. It can be distinguished from P. montana when comparing their tubers. N. phaseoloides produces really small tubers whereas the tubers of P. montana are big and edible.

== See also ==
- Pueraria montana
- Tropical agriculture
