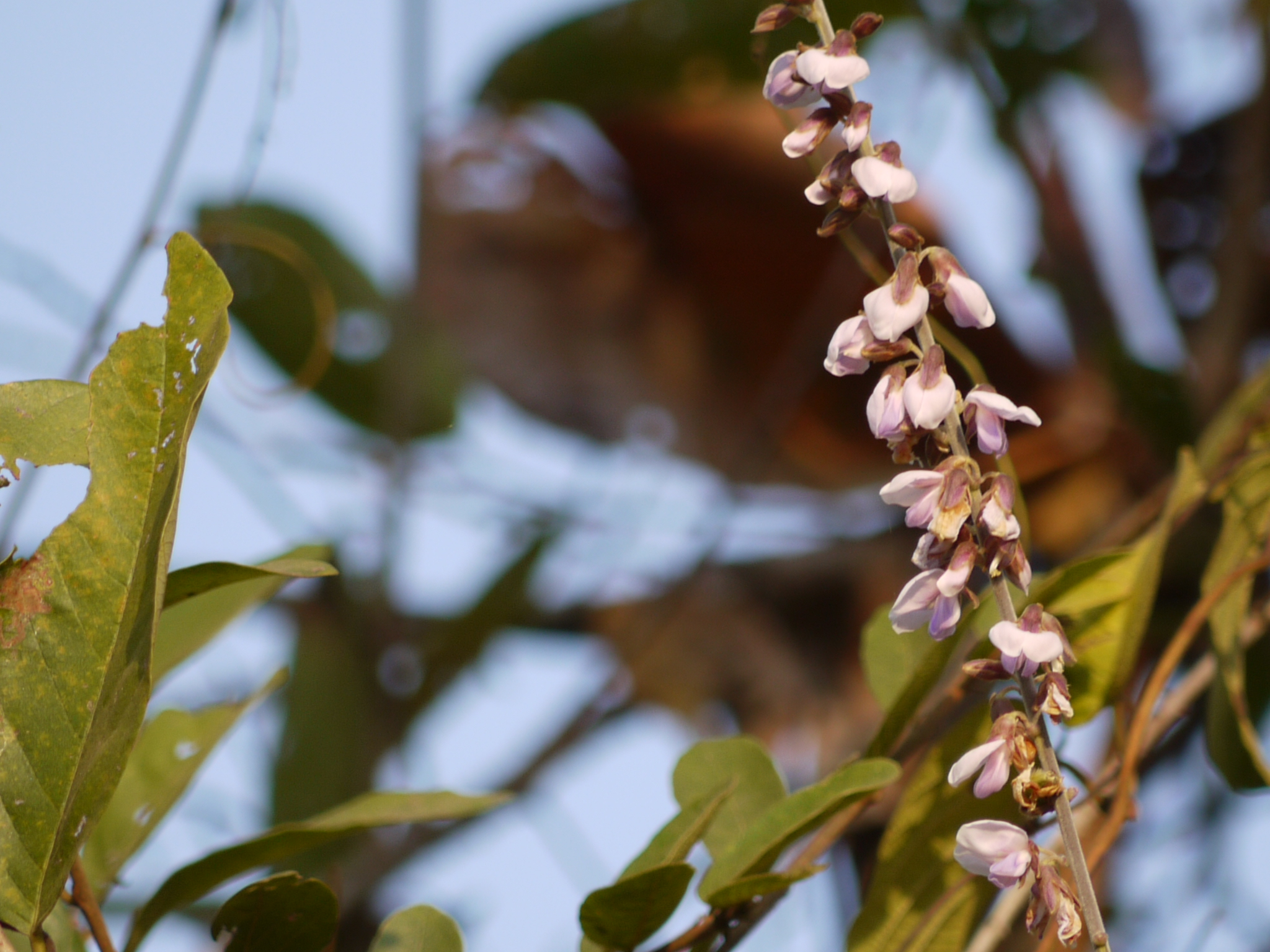

Scientific classification
- Kingdom: Plantae
- Clade: Tracheophytes
- Clade: Angiosperms
- Clade: Eudicots
- Clade: Rosids
- Order: Fabales
- Family: Fabaceae
- Subfamily: Faboideae
- Genus: Pueraria
- Species: P. tuberosa

Binomial name
- Pueraria tuberosa (Willd.) DC.

Synonyms
- Hedysarum tuberosum Willd.

= Pueraria tuberosa =

Species of legume

Pueraria tuberosa, commonly known as kudzu, Indian kudzu, or Nepalese kudzu, Vidarikand, Sanskrit: Bhukushmandi (भूकुशमंडी) is a climber with woody tuberculated stem. It is a climbing, coiling and trailing vine with large tuberous roots. The tubers are globose or pot-like, about 25 centimetres (9.8 in) across and the insides are white, starchy and mildly sweet. Leaves are trifoliate and alternate, while the leaflets are egg-shaped, with round base and unequal sides. They are 18 cm (7.1 in) long and 16 cm (6.3 in) wide and are hairless above. Flowers are bisexual, around 1.5 cm (0.59 in) across and blue or purplish-blue in color. The fruit pods are linear, about 2–5 cm (0.79–1.97 in) long and constricted densely between the seeds. They have silky, bristly reddish-brown hair. Seeds vary from 3 to 6 in number.

It is native to India, Pakistan, and Nepal. In Telugu, Kudzu is termed as Nela Gummadi, Dari Gummadi, Vidari Kanda.

== Conservation status ==
Pueraria tuberosa is not yet evaluated as per the IUCN but it is widely distributed in the Indian subcontinent(India, Pakistan, Nepal, Bangladesh, and Myanmar) and faces no serious threat. However, regional threats exist due to the unethical extraction of wild tubers on a large scale for traditional medicines. Despite this, this geophytic species remains abundant in the lower elevations(Shiwaliks) of the west Himalayas, indicating a stable population in these geographical regions.
