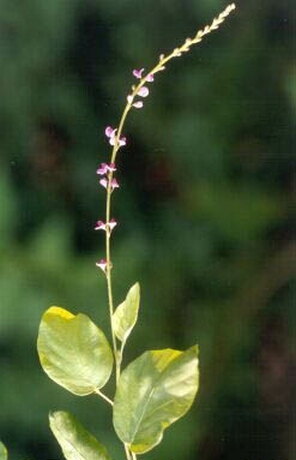

Scientific classification
- Kingdom: Plantae
- Clade: Embryophytes
- Clade: Tracheophytes
- Clade: Spermatophytes
- Clade: Angiosperms
- Clade: Eudicots
- Clade: Rosids
- Order: Fabales
- Family: Fabaceae
- Genus: Pleurolobus
- Species: P. gangeticus

Binomial name
- Pleurolobus gangeticus (L.) J.St.-Hil. ex H.Ohashi & K.Ohashi

Synonyms
- List: Aeschynomene gangetica (L.) Poir.; Desmodium gangeticum (L.) DC.; Hedysarum gangeticum L.; Hedysarum ochroleucum Moench; Meibomia gangetica (L.) Kuntze; Aeschynomene maculata Poir.; Desmodium cavaleriei H.Lév.; Desmodium collinum Wight; Desmodium gangeticum var. maculatum (L.) Baker; Desmodium lanceolatum (Schumach. & Thonn.) Walp.; Desmodium latifolium Wight, nom. illeg.; Desmodium maculatum (L.) DC.; Desmodium natalitium Sond.; Desmodium polygonoides Welw. ex Baker; Hedysarum collinum Roxb., nom. illeg.; Hedysarum lanceolatum Schumach. & Thonn.; Hedysarum maculatum L.; Hedysarum roseum Blume ex Miq., not validly publ.; Hedysarum styracifolium Roxb. ex Wight & Arn., not validly publ.; Meibomia natalitia (Sond.) Kuntze; Meibomia polygonoides (Welw. ex Baker) Kuntze; Pleurolobus maculatus J.St.-Hil., not validly publ.

= Pleurolobus gangeticus =

Species of plants

Pleurolobus gangeticus, commonly known by the name salparni, is a plant found throughout most parts of India and the Himalayas.

== Description ==
Pleurolobus gangeticus is a small shrub. It can grow up to 2–4 feet tall. The leaves are simple and alternate. They have an oblong shape and pinnate venation. They tend to grow up to 15 cm in length and 5 cm in width. The flowers have bilateral symmetry and are characterized for purple and white colors, and they have 3 petals. The inflorescence is indeterminate meaning that the growing flowers are on the top while the full flowers are on the lower part. The sexual reproductive system is hermaphroditic.

== Ecology ==
Pleurolobus gangeticus is found in places with partial shade or in the open, and very rarely in deep shade. It is native to tropical Africa, Asia, and northern Australia. Its biome is typically anthropogenic habitats in the lowlands, under ever wet or seasonal conditions. This plant grows best in dry conditions with clayey loam soils that are alkaline and moderately calcareous. The plant also uses pollinator such as bees and is frequently grazed by cattle which aids with seed dispersal. The plant spreads its seed through the small hairs on the seedpods that readily cling to human skin and clothing as well as other animals’ fur and feathers. This ensures that the seed gets maximum dispersal. Due to this method the plant is considered an invasive weed in some habitats. This species has a symbiotic relationship with certain soil bacteria; these bacteria form nodules on the roots and fix atmospheric nitrogen. One fungal parasite has been recorded on this species from India (Synchytrium desmodiicola), most seedlings come up in July after the first few showers and flowering and fruiting take place from October to February.
