= The Kudzu Queen =

Kudzu Queen pageants were local beauty competitions held in the Southern United States to promote kudzu.

"The Kudzu Queen" may refer to:

- The Kudzu Queen (book) by Mimi Herman
- The Kudzu Queen (play) by Gwenyfar Rohler
