= Hetty Jane Dunaway =

American actress and philanthropist

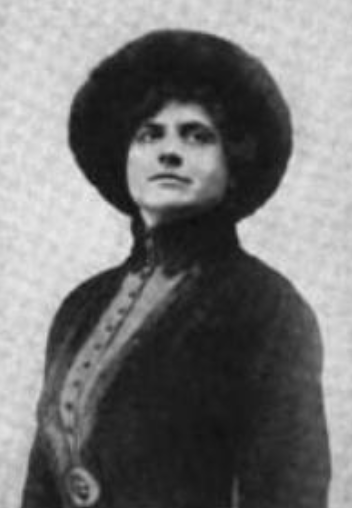
- Hetty Jane Dunaway, from a 1913 publication
- Born: August 20, 1870; Conway, Arkansas, US
- Died: December 12, 1961 (aged 91); Newnan, Georgia, US
- Other names: Hettie Jane Dunaway, Hetty Jane Sewell, H. J. D. Sewell
- Occupations: Actress, philanthropist
- Notable work: Creator of Dunaway Gardens in Georgia

Hetty Jane Dunaway Sewell (August 20, 1870 – December 12, 1961) was an American actress, monologuist, philanthropist and the creator of the Dunaway Gardens in rural Georgia.

== Early life ==
Dunaway was born in Conway, Arkansas, the daughter of John D. Dunaway and Emma Frances Blackwood Dunaway. Her father was a veteran of the Confederate States Army in the American Civil War, wounded at Murfreesboro. She attended the University of Kansas and the Curry School of Expression in Boston.

The entrance to the Roscoe-Dunaway Gardens Historic District, photographed in 2014

== Career ==
Dunaway had a popular monologue and musical comedy act on the Chautauqua circuit. She was perhaps best known for her performances of The Lady of the Decoration, a story set in Japan, which she performed for passengers on a train from Kansas City to Los Angeles in 1913, hired by the Santa Fe Railway Company. She wrote plays including The Flapper Grandmother (1924), Cupid Up to Date (1927), Mrs. and Mr. Polly Tickk (1927), What Do the People Want? (1927), and The Little Stranger (1929), and songs, including "When You're Waltzing with the One You Love" (1959).

Dunaway spent eighteen years overseeing construction of Dunaway Gardens, a "theater-garden" on her husband's family's former plantation in rural Georgia. It included twelve spring-fed pools, a waterfall, sunken and hanging gardens, lodgings and a tea room. The construction had employed many people who were paid 50 cents each day to help. Dunaway opened the grounds in 1934 as a performing arts training center for performers and other professionals. Minnie Pearl was one of the instructors. There was a 400-seat theater and another open-air amphitheater that could seat 1,000 people. The hole for the swimming pool had been blasted out of the rock using dynamite and the pool was filled by one of the seven springs.

The gardens were a success and they attracted celebrities including Tallulah Bankhead and Walt Disney. Dunaway herself was said to always dress well as if she was always about to appear on the stage. One local historian noted that television and improved roads, which enable people to travel to Atlanta to eat and see shows, reduced the interest in Dunaway Gardens through the 1950s. It closed in the 1960s.

== Personal life ==
Dunaway married Atlanta actor and booking agent Wayne Pendleton Sewell in 1916. They lived on his family's property near Roscoe, Georgia. Dunaway died in 1961, aged 91 years, in Newnan, Georgia.

After her death, the Dunaway Gardens closed, and deteriorated under an overgrowth of kudzu, until it was purchased in 2000, restored and reopened in 2003. The site is open for tourists, hosts weddings and other events, and is on the National Register of Historic Places.
