= List of mayors of Conway, Arkansas =

The following is a list of mayors of the city of Conway, Arkansas, United States.

- Lorenzo D. Pearle, 1875-1876
- E.C. Farmer, 1876-1877
- Edward Munroe Merriman, 1877-1878
- Able F. Livingston, 1879-1880
- George W. Bruce, 1880-1881
- John N. Walton, 1881-1882
- John Harrod, 1882-1883
- Homer G. Case, 1883-1884, 1885-1886
- John Allen Pence, 1885, 1899-1900
- John Ingram, 1886-1887
- Asa P. Robinson, 1887-1888
- W. G. Farmer, 1888-1889
- George W. Rice, 1889-1890
- William Wyle Martin, 1890-1894, 1896-1898, 1900-1901, 1902-1905
- John T. Young, 1895-1896
- E.A. Bolton, 1901-1902
- Frank E. Robins, 1906-1908
- A. J. Witt, 1909-1910
- W.H. Duncan, 1910-1913
- Frank Jones, 1914-1915
- J. C. Dawson, 1916-1917
- George W. Bruce, 1918
- George Shaw, 1918-1919 (acting mayor)
- William D. Cole, 1920-1925
- H.D. Russell, 1926-1933
- B.G. Wilson, 1933-1939
- Alph Hamburg, 1939-1941
- James J. Kane, 1941-1944
- George Muse, 1944-1949
- Edgar B. Parker, 1949-1954, 1957-1961
- M.M. Satterfield, 1954-1957
- Walter Dunaway, 1962-1974
- Jim A. Hoggard, 1975-1978
- Bill Wright, 1979-1986
- David G. Kinley, 1987-1998
- Tab Townsell, 1999-2016
- Bart Castleberry, 2017-

== See also ==
- Conway history
- List of mayors of places in Arkansas
