= Conway, Arkansas =

- City
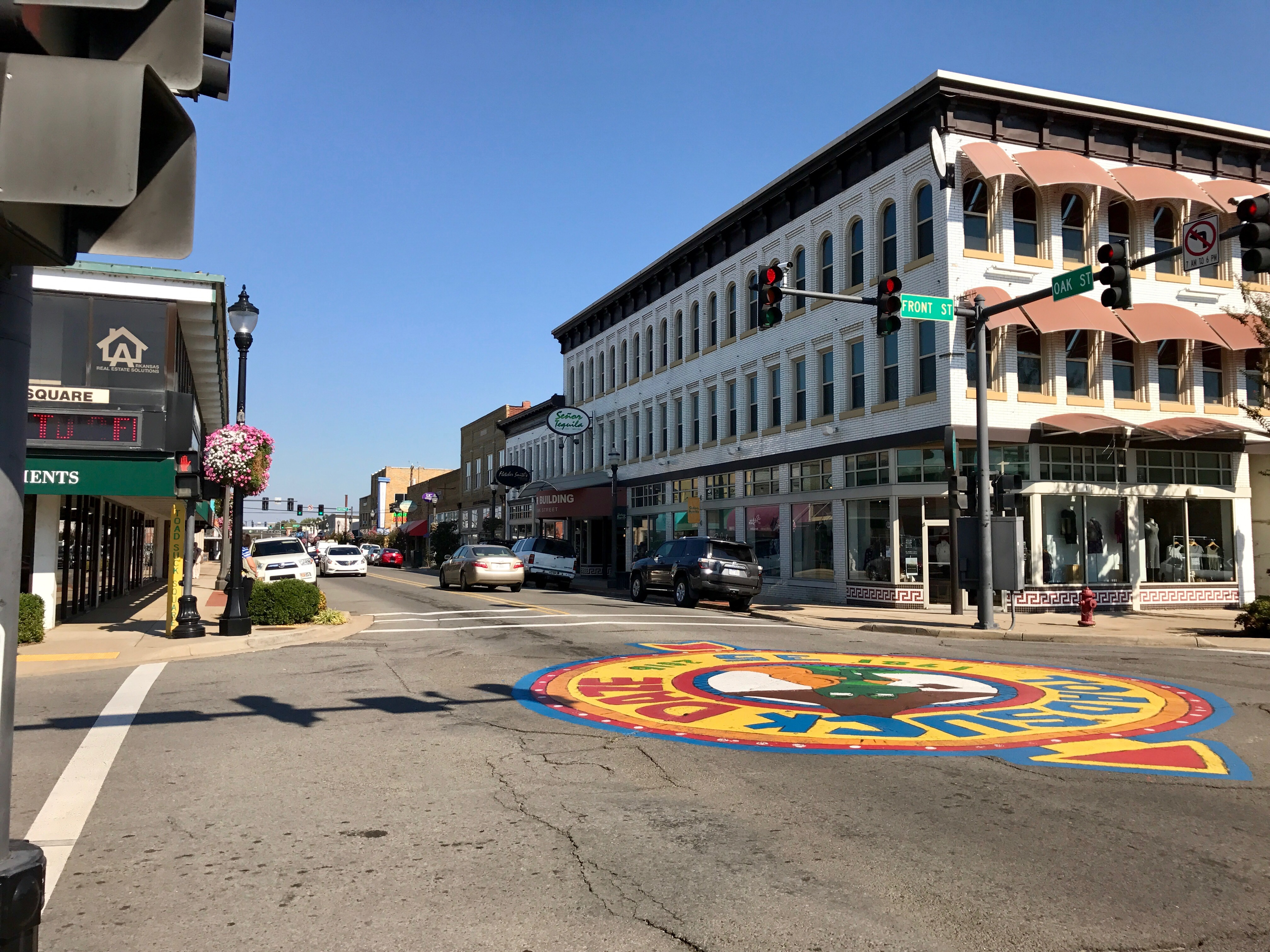
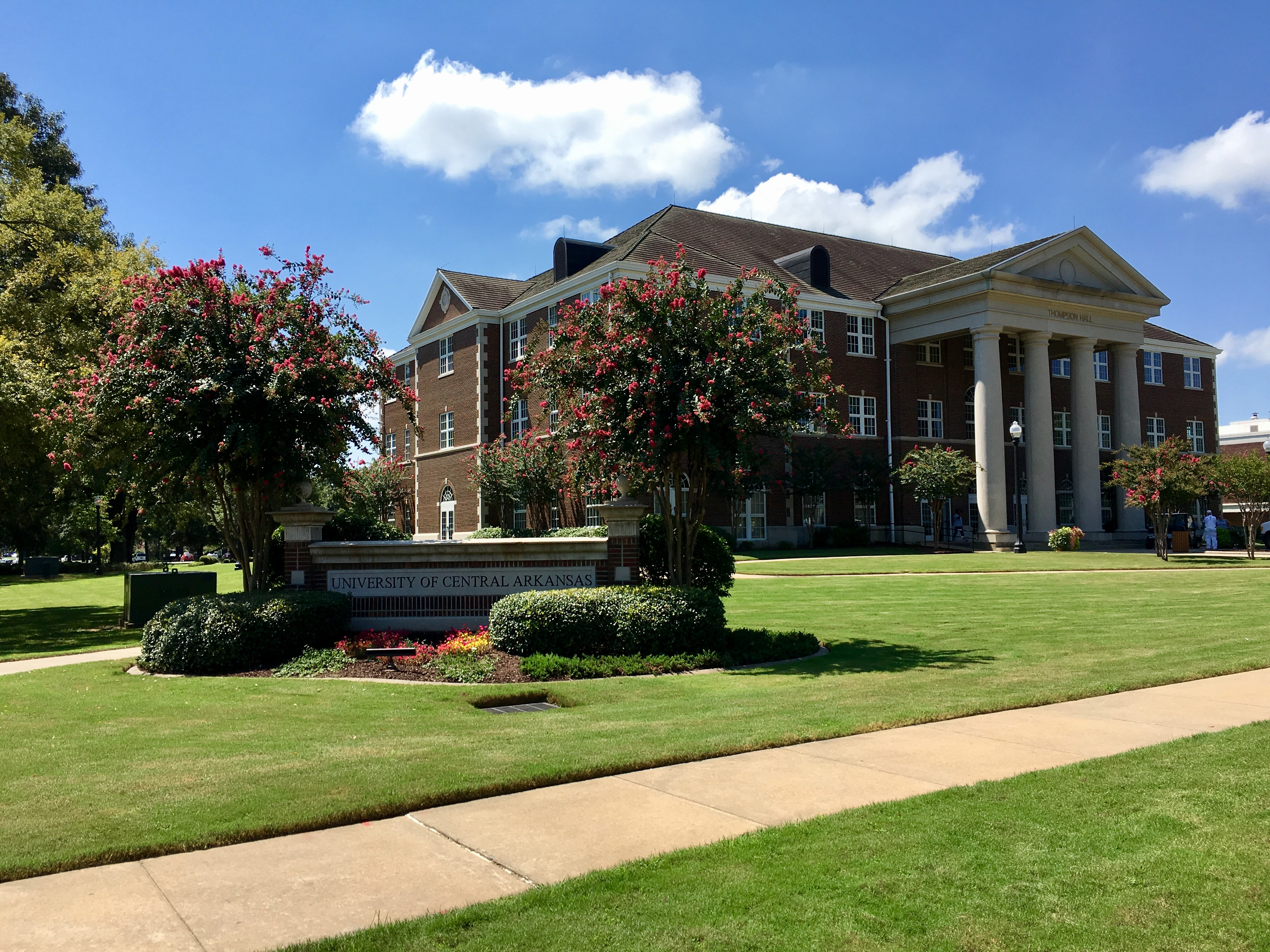
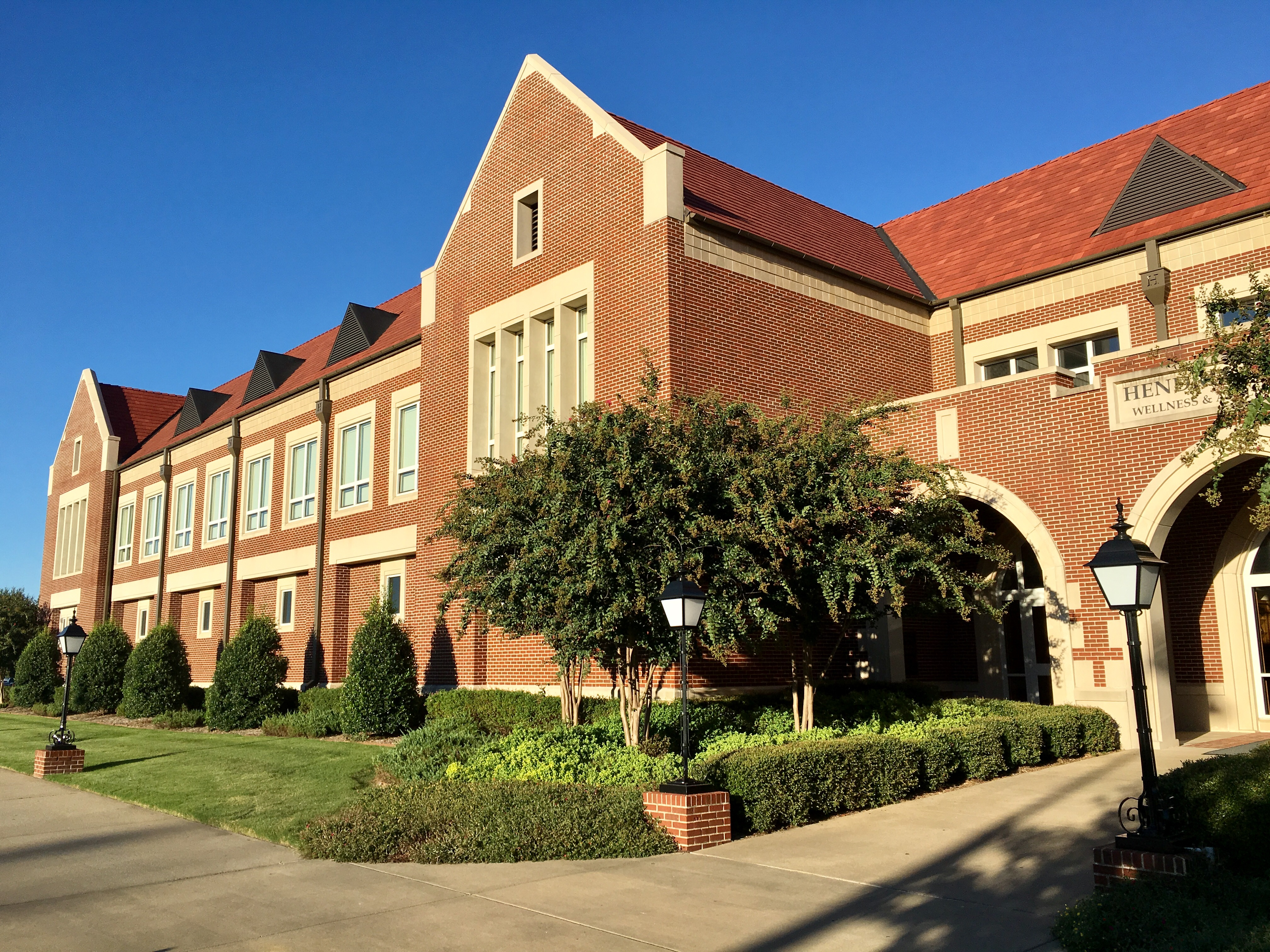
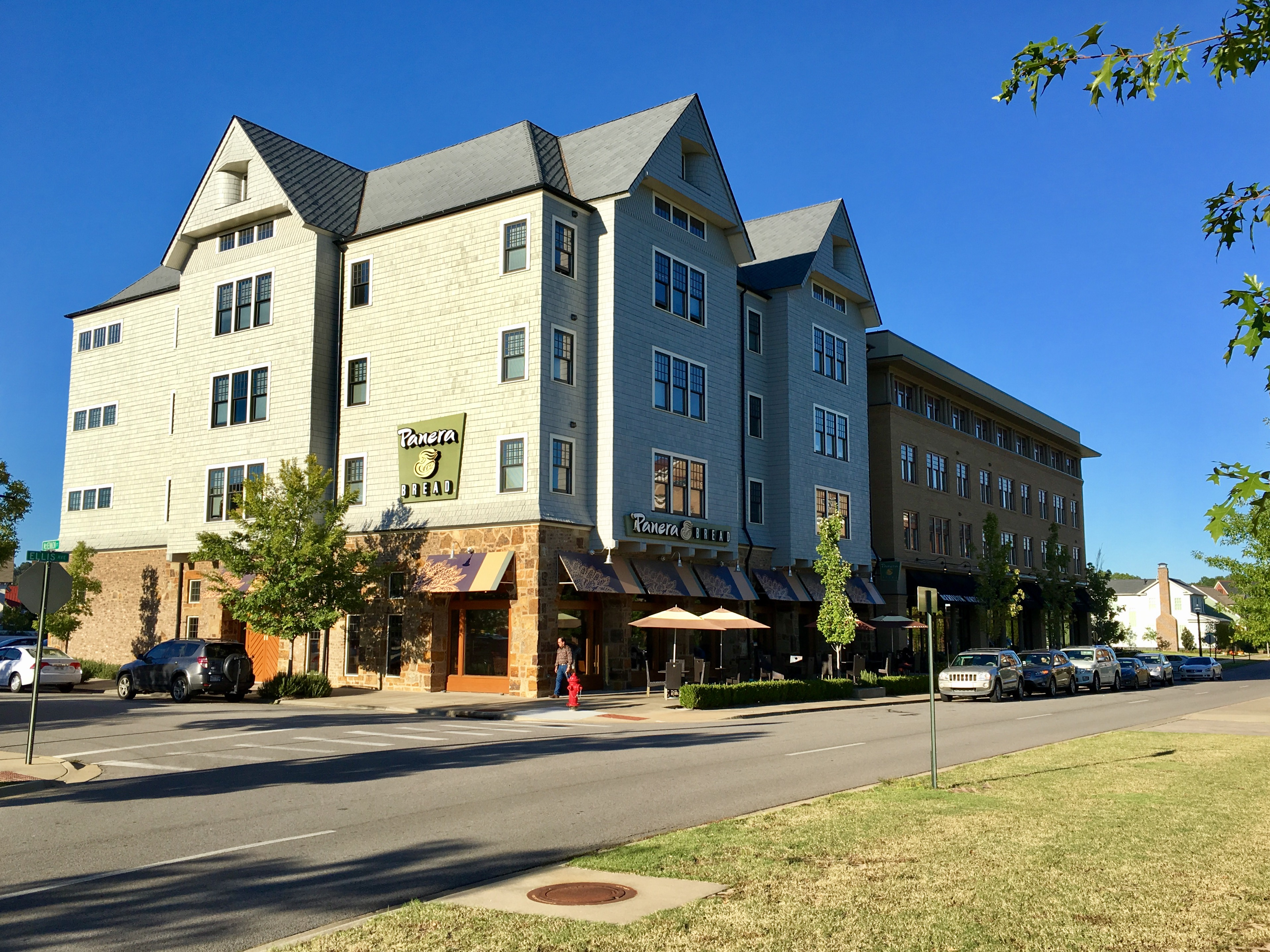
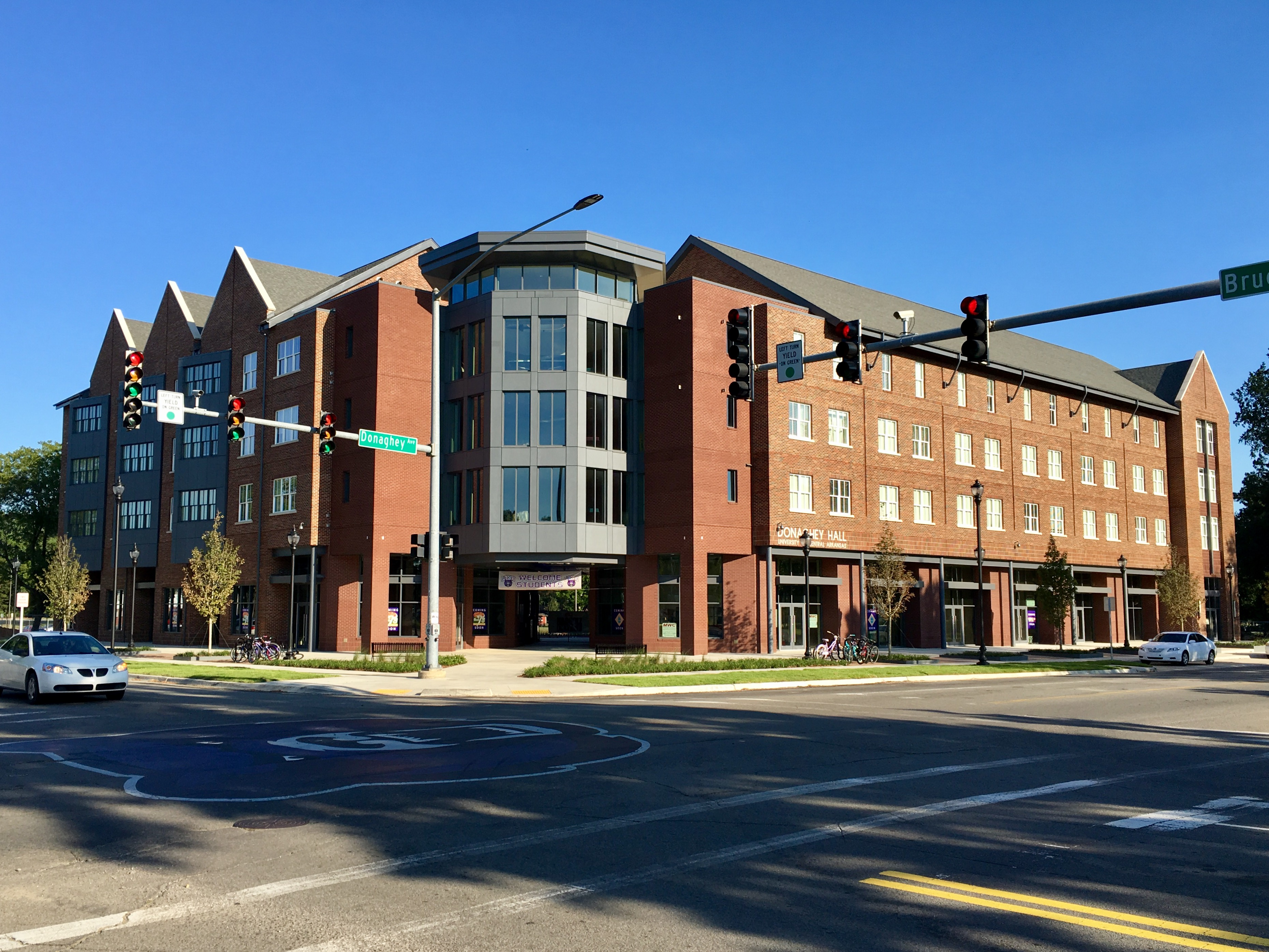
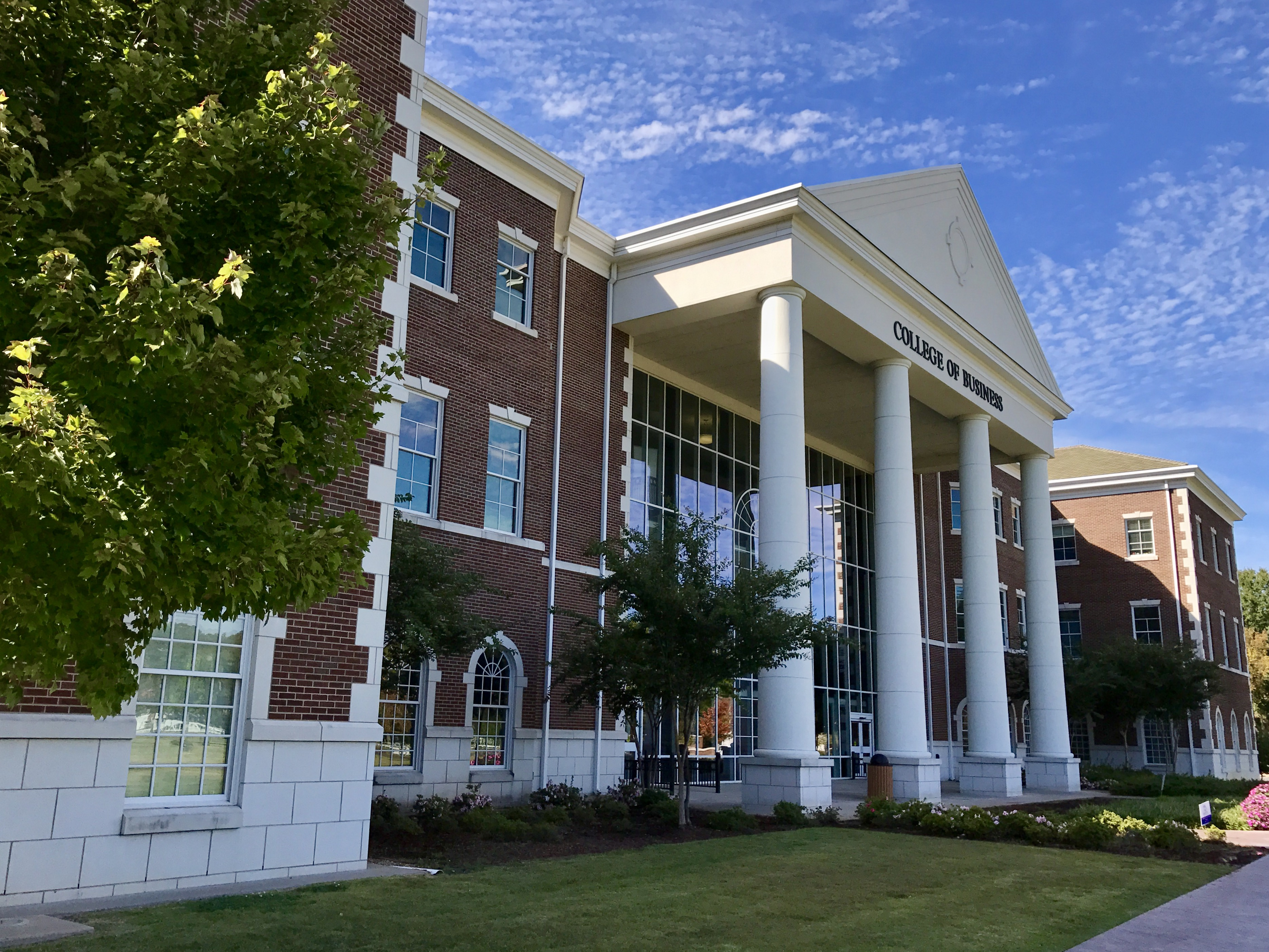
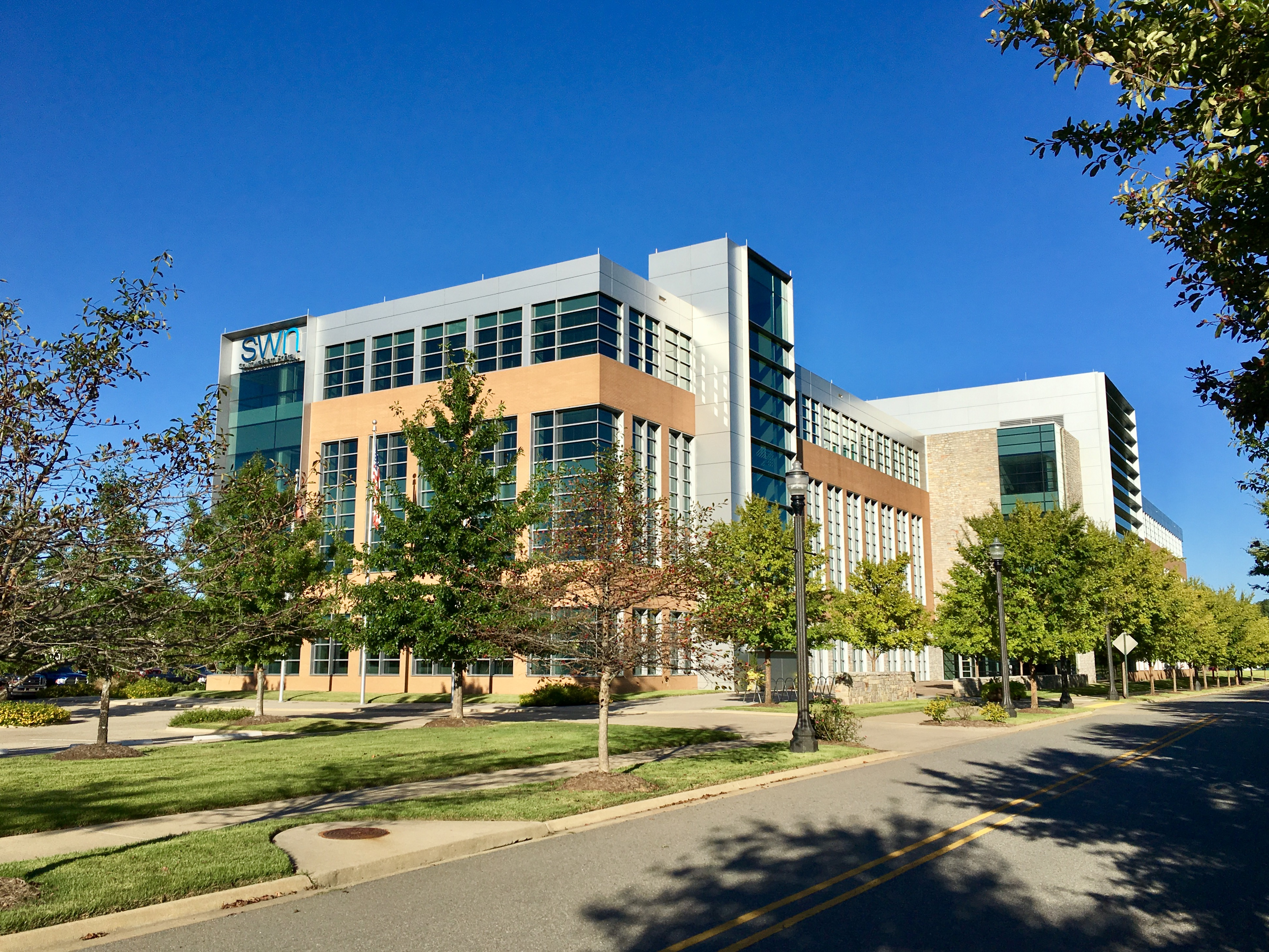
- Clockwise from top: Toad Suck Square, Hendrix College, Donaghey Hall, Offices, College of Business, Hendrix Village, University of Central Arkansas

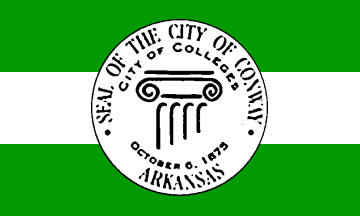
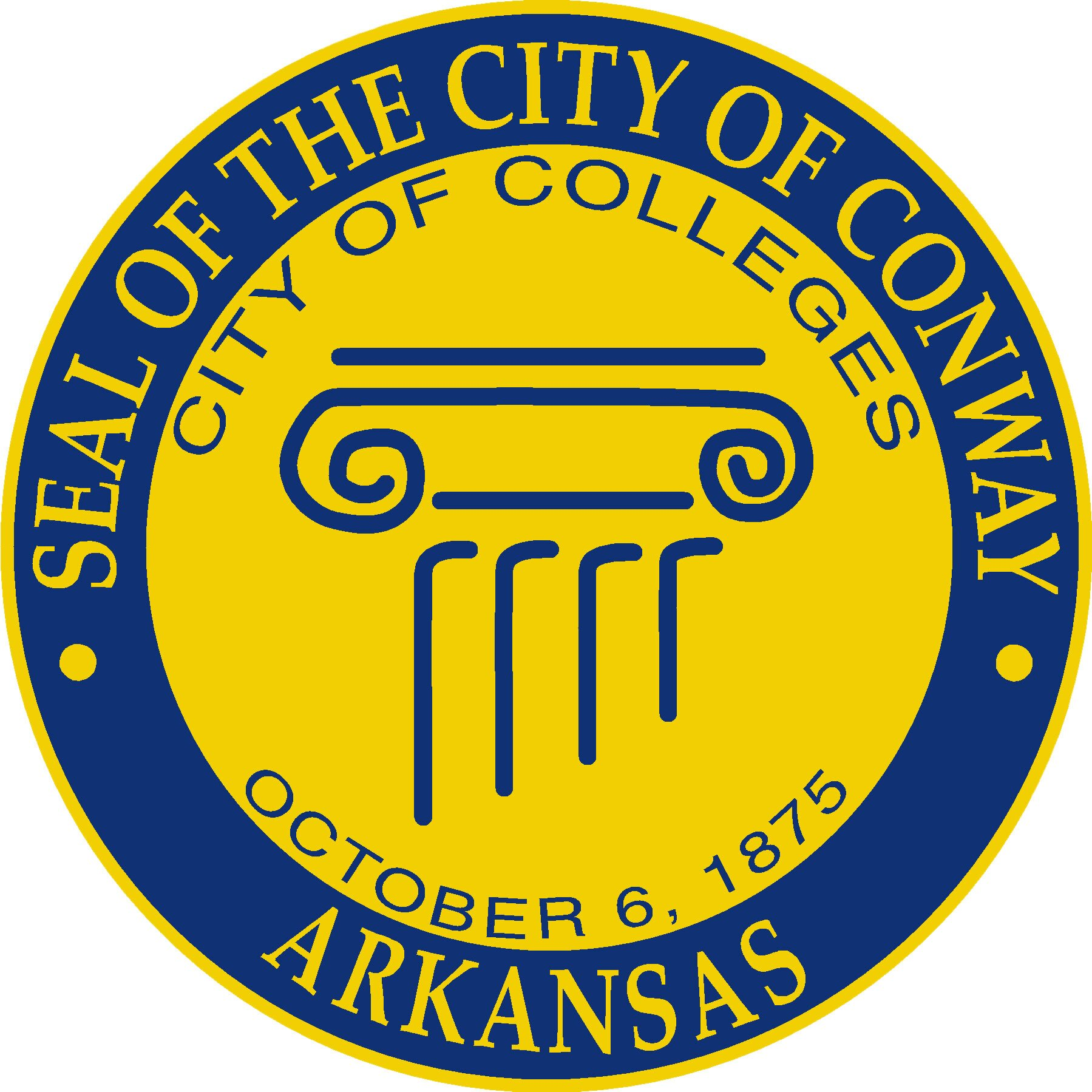
- Flag Seal
- Nickname: City of Colleges
- Interactive map of Conway, Arkansas
- Location within Arkansas Location within the United States
- Coordinates: 35°05′14″N 92°27′12″W
- Country: United States
- State: Arkansas
- County: Faulkner
- MSA: Central Arkansas
- CSA: Little Rock-North Little Rock
- Founded: 1872
- Incorporated: October 16, 1875

Government
  - Type: Mayor-Council
  - Mayor: Bart Castleberry (I)
  - City Council: Aldermen: Andy Hawkins; David Grimes; Drew Spurgers; Shelley Mehl; Mark Ledbetter; Spencer Hawks; Theodore Jones Jr.; Shelia Isby

Area
  - City: 46.51 sq mi (120.47 km^{2})
  - Land: 46.26 sq mi (119.81 km^{2})
  - Water: 0.25 sq mi (0.65 km^{2}) 0.54%
- Elevation: 331 ft (101 m)

Population (2020)
  - City: 64,134
  - Estimate (2025): 72,328 ▲
  - Rank: 7th in Arkansas
  - Density: 1,386.4/sq mi (535.28/km^{2})
  - Metro: 734,622 (US: 76th)
  - CSA: 905,847 (US: 60th)
- Demonym: Conwegian
- Time zone: UTC−6 (CST)
  - Summer (DST): UTC−5 (CDT)
- ZIP codes: 72032-72035
- Area code: 501
- FIPS code: 05-15190
- GNIS feature ID: 2404119
- Major airport2404119: Clinton National Airport (LIT)
- Website: conwayarkansas.gov

Conway is a city in Faulkner County, Arkansas, United States, and its county seat. It had a population of 64,134 at the 2020 census, making Conway the eighth-most populous city in Arkansas. It is located within Central Arkansas and serves as a regional hub for Faulkner County and surrounding areas. Conway is home to three post-secondary educational institutions, earning it the nickname The City of Colleges.

== History ==
The city of Conway was founded by Asa P. Robinson, who came to the area shortly after the Civil War. Robinson was the chief engineer for the Little Rock-Fort Smith Railroad (now the Union Pacific). Part of his compensation was the deed to a tract of land, one square mile, located near the old settlement of Cadron. When the railroad came through, Robinson had deeded a small tract of his land back to the railroad for a depot site. He laid off a town site around the depot and named it "Conway Station" in honor of a famous Arkansas family. Conway Station contained two small stores, two saloons, a depot, some temporary housing, and a post office. Despite being founded as a railroad town, there is currently no passenger service; this is attributed to the increasing emphasis placed on cars.

In 1878, Father Joseph Strub, a priest in the Roman Catholic Holy Ghost Fathers, arrived in Arkansas. A native of Alsace-Lorraine, Strub was expelled from Prussia during the Kulturkampf in 1872. He moved to the United States, settling in Pittsburgh, where he founded Duquesne University in October 1878. Difficulties with Bishop John Tuigg led Strub to leave Pittsburgh in late October 1878 to travel to Conway. In 1879, Strub convinced the Little Rock and Fort Smith Railroad to deed 200,000 acres (810 km^{2}) along the northern side of the Arkansas River to the Holy Ghost Fathers in order to found the St. Joseph Colony. This included land on which Father Strub founded and built St. Joseph Catholic Church of Conway. As part of the land deal, the railroad offered land at 20 cents per acre to every German immigrant. In order to attract Roman Catholic Germans to Conway and the surrounding areas, Father Strub wrote The Guiding Star for the St. Joseph Colony. In addition to extolling the qualities of Conway and the surrounding area, Father Strub provided information on how best to travel from Europe to Conway. By 1889, over 100 German families had settled in Conway, giving the town many of its distinctively German street and business names.

On April 10, 1965, an F4 tornado struck Conway, causing six deaths and 200 injuries.

== Geography ==
Conway is located in southwestern Faulkner County. Interstate 40 passes through the northern and eastern sides of the city, with access from Exits 124 through 132. Via I-40, Memphis is 160 miles (260 km) to the east, Little Rock is 30 miles (48 km) to the east (south), Russellville is 46 miles (74 km) to the west, and Oklahoma City is 307 miles (494 km) to the west.

According to the United States Census Bureau, Conway has a total area of 45.6 square miles (118.1 km^{2}), of which 45.3 square miles (117.4 km^{2}) is land and 0.2 square miles (0.6 km^{2}), or 0.54%, is water.

=== Climate ===
The climate in this area is characterized by hot, humid summers and generally mild to cool winters. According to the Köppen Climate Classification system, Conway has a humid subtropical climate, abbreviated "Cfa" on climate maps.

Conway

Climate chart (precipitation, max. and min. temperature)
J	F	M	A	M	J	J	A	S	O	N	D
3.6 50 27	4 55 31	4.9 64 40	4.9 72 48	4.8 80 58	3.9 88 66	3.2 92 70	2.9 92 69	3.1 85 61	4.4 74 49	4.8 62 39	4.8 51 30
- █ Average max. and min. temperatures in °F
- █ Precipitation totals in inches
- Source: The Weather Channel
Metric conversion
J	F	M	A	M	J	J	A	S	O	N	D
91 10 −3	102 13 −1	124 18 4	124 22 9	122 27 14	99 31 19	81 33 21	74 33 21	79 29 16	112 23 9	122 17 4	122 11 −1
- █ Average max. and min. temperatures in °C
- █ Precipitation totals in mm

Climate data for Conway, Arkansas (1991–2020 normals, extremes 1893–present)
Month	Jan	Feb	Mar	Apr	May	Jun	Jul	Aug	Sep	Oct	Nov	Dec	Year
Record high °F (°C)	83 (28)	86 (30)	94 (34)	96 (36)	101 (38)	109 (43)	115 (46)	115 (46)	110 (43)	101 (38)	88 (31)	81 (27)	115 (46)
Mean daily maximum °F (°C)	49.0 (9.4)	54.1 (12.3)	63.0 (17.2)	72.0 (22.2)	79.4 (26.3)	87.3 (30.7)	91.7 (33.2)	91.4 (33.0)	84.7 (29.3)	73.9 (23.3)	61.0 (16.1)	51.6 (10.9)	71.6 (22.0)
Daily mean °F (°C)	38.1 (3.4)	42.2 (5.7)	51.0 (10.6)	59.7 (15.4)	68.4 (20.2)	76.7 (24.8)	80.7 (27.1)	79.9 (26.6)	72.6 (22.6)	61.1 (16.2)	49.4 (9.7)	40.8 (4.9)	60.0 (15.6)
Mean daily minimum °F (°C)	27.1 (−2.7)	30.4 (−0.9)	39.0 (3.9)	47.4 (8.6)	57.5 (14.2)	66.1 (18.9)	69.6 (20.9)	68.4 (20.2)	60.5 (15.8)	48.3 (9.1)	37.7 (3.2)	30.0 (−1.1)	48.5 (9.2)
Record low °F (°C)	−13 (−25)	−15 (−26)	9 (−13)	25 (−4)	33 (1)	41 (5)	51 (11)	49 (9)	34 (1)	22 (−6)	5 (−15)	−6 (−21)	−15 (−26)
Average precipitation inches (mm)	3.82 (97)	4.17 (106)	5.25 (133)	5.43 (138)	5.57 (141)	3.62 (92)	3.40 (86)	3.48 (88)	3.12 (79)	4.03 (102)	4.56 (116)	4.74 (120)	51.19 (1,300)
Average snowfall inches (cm)	0.5 (1.3)	1.3 (3.3)	0.4 (1.0)	0.0 (0.0)	0.0 (0.0)	0.0 (0.0)	0.0 (0.0)	0.0 (0.0)	0.0 (0.0)	0.0 (0.0)	0.0 (0.0)	0.1 (0.25)	2.3 (5.8)
Average precipitation days (≥ 0.01 in)	8.0	7.8	9.8	8.6	9.3	7.0	7.5	7.4	6.3	7.1	7.6	8.3	94.7
Average snowy days (≥ 0.1 in)	0.3	0.6	0.2	0.0	0.0	0.0	0.0	0.0	0.0	0.0	0.1	0.2	1.4
Source: National Oceanic and Atmospheric Administration

== Demographics ==
Historical population
Census	Pop.	Note	%±
1880	1,028		—
1890	1,207		17.4%
1900	2,003		65.9%
1910	2,794		39.5%
1920	4,564		63.4%
1930	5,534		21.3%
1940	5,782		4.5%
1950	8,610		48.9%
1960	9,791		13.7%
1970	15,510		58.4%
1980	20,375		31.4%
1990	26,481		30.0%
2000	43,167		63.0%
2010	58,908		36.5%
2020	64,134		8.9%
2025 (est.)	72,328	▲	12.8%
U.S. Decennial Census; 2018 Estimate

=== Racial and ethnic composition ===
Historical racial composition	2010	2000	1990	1980	1970
Non-Hispanic White	77.4%	84.1%	90.5%	90.9%	92.0%
Black or African American	15.6%	12.0%	8.5%	8.3% (Note: The 1980 U.S. Census referred to the "Black or African American" as a truncated "Black".)	8.0%
Native Hawaiian and other Pacific Islander	0.05%	0.03%	0.02%	—	— (Note: The 1970 U.S. Census did not record Hispanic American, Native American, Pacific Islander, or Asian American. The race selections on the census were truncated, so other race would be the default.)
American Indian and Alaskan Native	0.44%	0.36%	0.34%	—	—
Hispanic or Latino	5.09%	2.26%	0.43%	0.5%	—
Asian	1.9%	1.24%	0.46%	—	—
Other race or multiracial	4.6%	2.2%	0.12%	—	0.17%

Conway city, Arkansas – Racial and ethnic composition Note: the US Census treats Hispanic/Latino as an ethnic category. This table excludes Latinos from the racial categories and assigns them to a separate category. Hispanics/Latinos may be of any race.
Race / Ethnicity (NH = Non-Hispanic)	Pop. 2000	Pop. 2010	Pop. 2020	% 2000	% 2010	% 2020
White alone (NH)	35,817	44,223	42,317	82.97%	75.07%	65.98%
Black or African American alone (NH)	5,211	9,112	11,718	12.07%	15.47%	18.27%
Native American or Alaska Native alone (NH)	148	243	222	0.34%	0.41%	0.35%
Asian alone (NH)	536	1,113	1,207	1.24%	1.89%	1.88%
Native Hawaiian or Pacific Islander alone (NH)	13	28	35	0.03%	0.05%	0.05%
Other race alone (NH)	38	75	262	0.09%	0.13%	0.41%
Mixed race or Multiracial (NH)	421	1,116	4,079	0.98%	1.89%	6.36%
Hispanic or Latino (any race)	983	2,998	4,294	2.28%	5.09%	6.70%
Total	43,167	58,908	64,134	100.00%	100.00%	100.00%

=== 2020 census ===
As of the 2020 census, there were 64,134 people, 25,370 households, and 14,609 families residing in the city. The median age was 30.7 years. 21.4% of residents were under the age of 18 and 12.4% were 65 years of age or older. For every 100 females there were 90.9 males, and for every 100 females age 18 and over there were 87.2 males age 18 and over.

95.5% of residents lived in urban areas, while 4.5% lived in rural areas.

There were 25,370 households in Conway, of which 29.8% had children under the age of 18 living in them. Of all households, 39.9% were married-couple households, 20.9% were households with a male householder and no spouse or partner present, and 32.3% were households with a female householder and no spouse or partner present. About 31.3% of all households were made up of individuals and 8.9% had someone living alone who was 65 years of age or older.

There were 27,503 housing units, of which 7.8% were vacant. The homeowner vacancy rate was 1.6% and the rental vacancy rate was 8.2%.

Racial composition as of the 2020 census
Race	Number	Percent
White	43,182	67.3%
Black or African American	11,808	18.4%
American Indian and Alaska Native	311	0.5%
Asian	1,215	1.9%
Native Hawaiian and Other Pacific Islander	47	0.1%
Some other race	2,213	3.5%
Two or more races	5,358	8.4%

=== Population estimates and projections ===
The 2025 projected population for Conway is 73,622. This projection assumes an annual rate of change of 2.9%, consistent with the population change from 2022 to 2023 according to the US Census Bureau's 2023 Population Estimates Program.

=== 2010 census ===
As of the census of 2010, there were 58,908 people, 23,205 households, and 13,969 families residing in the city. The population density was 1,299.2 inhabitants per square mile (501.6/km^{2}). There were 24,402 housing units at an average density of 538.2 units per square mile (207.8 units/km^{2}). The racial makeup of the city was 77.4% White, 15.6% Black or African American, 0.4% Native American, 1.9% Asian, 0.1% Pacific Islander, 2.4% from other races, and 2.2% from two or more races. 5.1% of the population were Hispanic or Latino of any race.

There were 23,205 households, out of which 33.1% had children under the age of 18 living with them, 43.2% were married couples living together, 12.8% had a female householder with no husband present, and 39.8% were non-families. 27.0% of all households were made up of individuals, and 7.0% had someone living alone who was 65 years of age or older. The average household size was 2.45 and the average family size was 3.01.

In the city, the population was spread out, with 22.7% under the age of 18, 22.9% from 18 to 24, 27.2% from 25 to 44, 18.5% from 45 to 64, and 8.7% who were 65 years of age or older. The median age was 27.3 years. There were 51.7% females and 48.3% males. For ages under 18, there were 49.2% females and 50.8% males.

The median income for a household in the city was $42,640, and the median income for a family was $63,860. The per capita income for the city was $42,582. About 9.3% of families and 16.3% of the population were below the poverty line, including 15.0% of those under age 18 and 10.8% of those age 65 or over.

47.6% of Conway's population describes themselves as religious, slightly below the national average of 48.8%. 44.5% of people in Conway who describe themselves as having a religion are Baptist (21.7% of the city's total population). 9.2% of people holding a religion are Catholic (4.5% of the city's total population). The proportions of Methodists and Pentecostals are higher than the national average.

== Economy ==
Conway was home to one of the world's largest school bus manufacturers, IC Corporation. The Conway plant was one of only two IC manufacturing plants; the other is located in Tulsa, Oklahoma. IC Corporation is a wholly owned subsidiary of Navistar International Corporation of Lisle, Illinois. IC was previously known as American Transportation (AmTran) Corporation and Ward Body Works. The company was founded in 1933. IC Corporation closed its plant and moved all bus manufacturing operations to its Tulsa plant in 2010, largely due to incentives offered by the city of Tulsa.

R. D. "Bob" Nabholz founded Nabholz Construction in Conway in 1949. It currently employs over 800 people and has been listed by Engineering News-Record (ENR) magazine as one of the Top 400 General Contractors every year since 1986. Currently, the company is ranked #161. Conway Corporation handles the local utilities (cable TV, Internet, and telephone services, in addition to electricity and water) for the city of Conway.

Acxiom Corporation, an interactive marketing services company, was founded in 1969 in Conway.

On June 19, 2008, Hewlett-Packard announced it would be opening a 150,000-square-foot (14,000 m^{2}) facility with 1,200 employees in 2009. The building, built by Nabholz Construction and located in the Meadows Office and Technology Park, has since been abandoned by HP and is now leased to Gainwell Technologies.

On December 16, 2021, Arkansas-based company Westrock Coffee announced the planned opening of a new plant in Conway. The company purchased a 524,000-square-foot (48,700 m^{2}) facility that is expected to create 250 jobs.

=== Largest employers ===
The largest employers in Conway as of May 2023 were as follows:

Rank	Employer	Employees
1	Conway Regional Health System	1,650
2	University of Central Arkansas	1,600
3	Acxiom	1,450
4	Conway Public School District	1,150
5	Conway Human Development Center	900
6	Walmart	825
7	Gainwell Technologies	650
8	Virco Manufacturing	650
9	Home BancShares	550
10	Nabholz Construction	550

== Government and politics ==
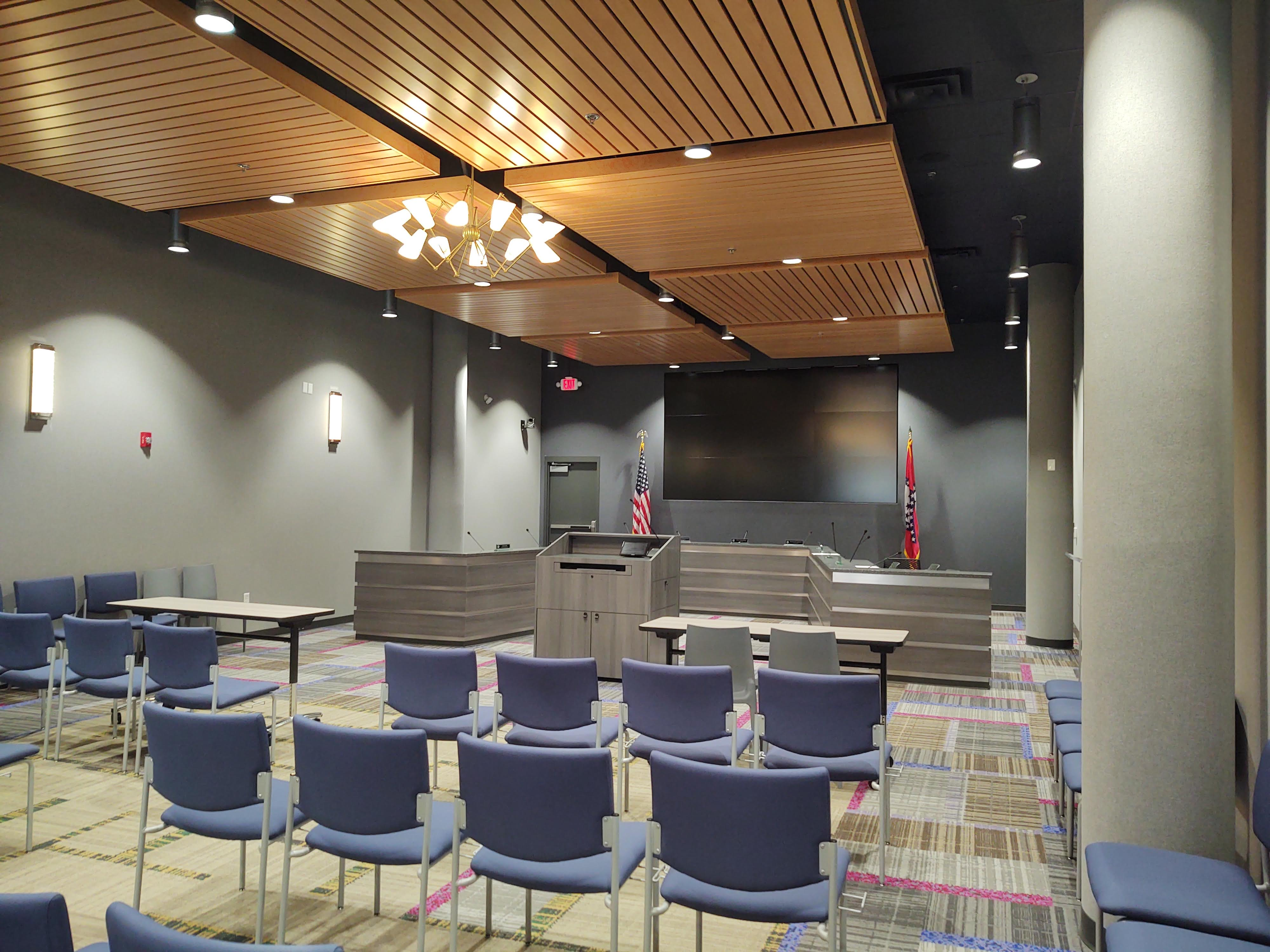
Conway city council chambers

=== Mayor–city council ===
Conway operates within the mayor–city council form of government. The mayor is elected by a citywide election to serve as the city's chief executive officer (CEO) by presiding over all city functions, policies, rules, and laws. Once elected, the mayor also allocates duties to city employees. The Conway mayoral election coincides with the election of the President of the United States. Mayors serve four-year terms and can serve unlimited terms.

The city council is the unicameral legislative of the city, consisting of two members from each of the city's four wards. Also included in the council's duties is balancing the city's budget and passing ordinances. The body also controls the representatives of specialized city commissions underneath their jurisdiction.

== Arts and culture ==
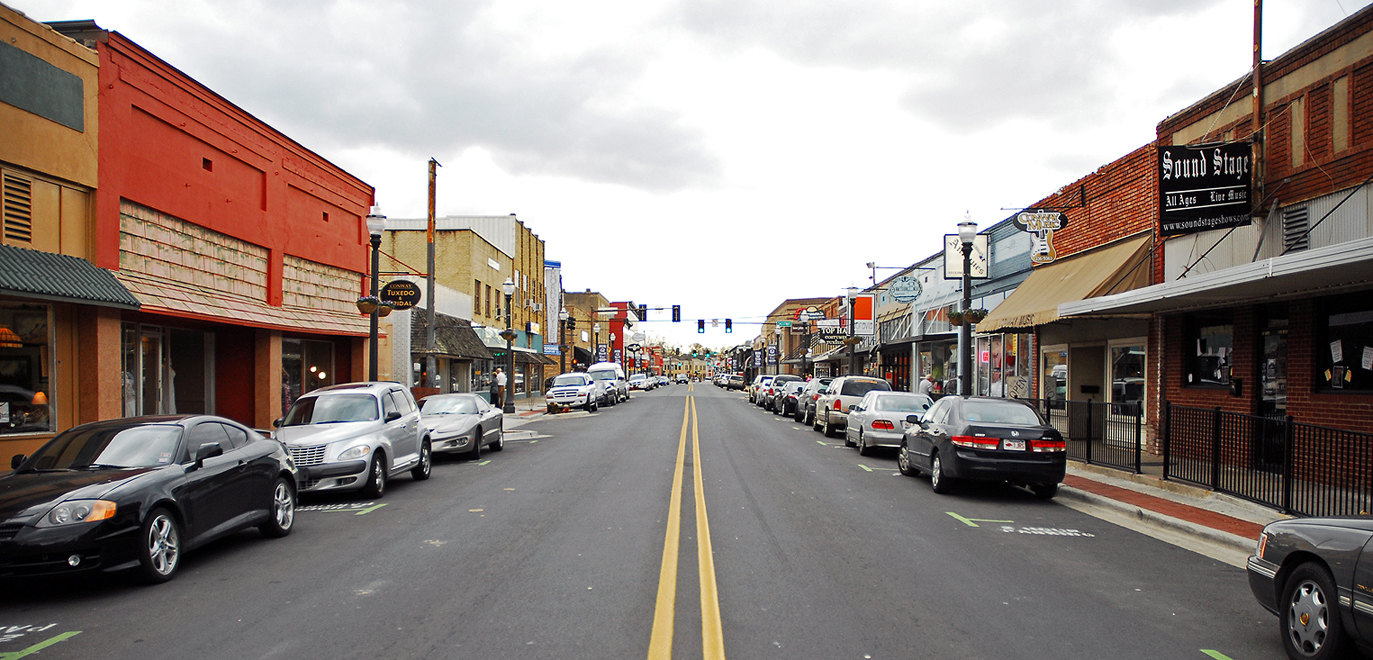
Downtown Conway

The Conway Symphony Orchestra performs many times throughout the year, and the Conway Community Arts Association has been presenting theatre and other art opportunities to the community for over 40 years. The Arkansas Shakespeare Theatre, based in Conway, is the state's only professional Shakespeare theater. It holds an annual summer festival in June.

There are also art, music, and theater opportunities provided by Conway's three colleges. The University of Central Arkansas's Public Appearances program provides dance, music, and theater offerings each year.

The national award-winning community theatre, The Lantern Theatre, is located downtown and offers a wide variety of plays and musicals year-round.

Conway Public Schools have theater and music programs, with large concert and marching bands that consistently receive high marks in regional competitions.

One of the city's largest annual events, Toad Suck Daze, has been held since 1982. The three-day community festival incorporates live music, food and craft vendors, and amusement rides during the first weekend of May. Proceeds from the festival fund college scholarships for local students.

The Faulkner County Museum focuses on the prehistory, history, and culture of Faulkner County. Located inside the former Faulkner County Jail, it displays photos, artifacts, equipment, household items, clothing, and arts and crafts by local artists. The museum also holds an annual open house that showcases interactive demonstrations and various crafts.

Conway is a popular sport-fishing destination and is home to the largest man-made Game and Fish Commission lake in the United States. Lake Conway, holds largemouth bass, crappie, gar, catfish, bream, bowfin, and others. The Arkansas Crappie Masters state tournament is held here every year.

The city held its first-ever EcoFest on September 12, 2009, in Laurel Park. EcoFest included exhibits and events relating to "green" and sustainable initiatives, including a cardboard car derby and an alleycat bicycle ride. According to organizers led by Debbie Plopper, the event was a success. Mayor Tab Townsell said the event indicated to him that "interest in sustainability is flourishing in this community."

=== Libraries ===
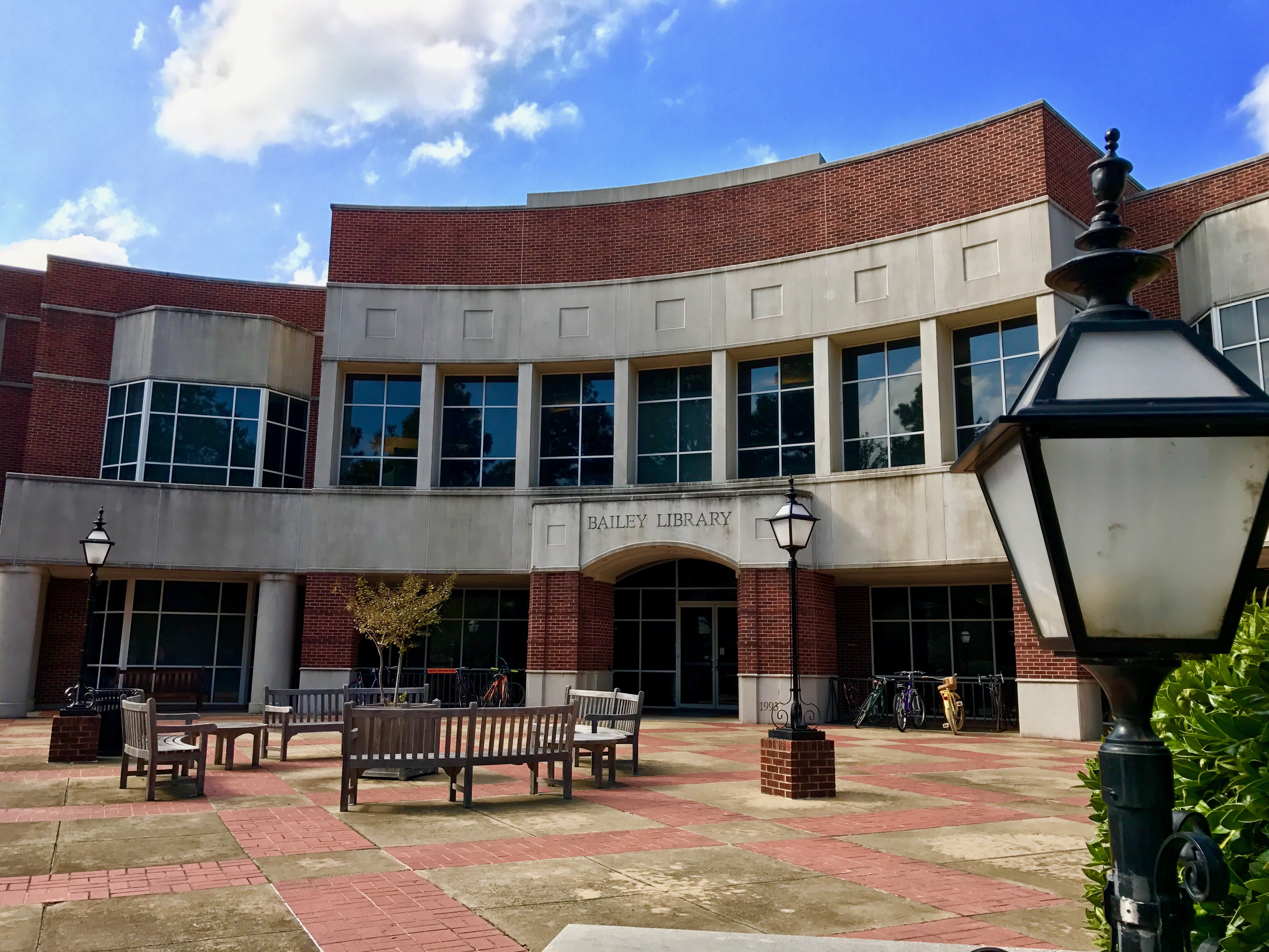
Bailey Library at Hendrix College

The Faulkner-Van Buren Regional Library System serves the city, a two-county library system formed in 1954. Originally the city was served by the Conway Library from 1935 until the merger into the current system. Today, the Conway Library serves as the headquarters for the eight-library regional system.

In addition to this, the students of the University of Central Arkansas and Hendrix College have free access to both the Torreyson Library at UCA and the Bailey Library at Hendrix by showing a current student ID from their respective college.

== Parks and recreation ==
There are 15 parks located within Conway.

== Education ==
=== College and universities ===
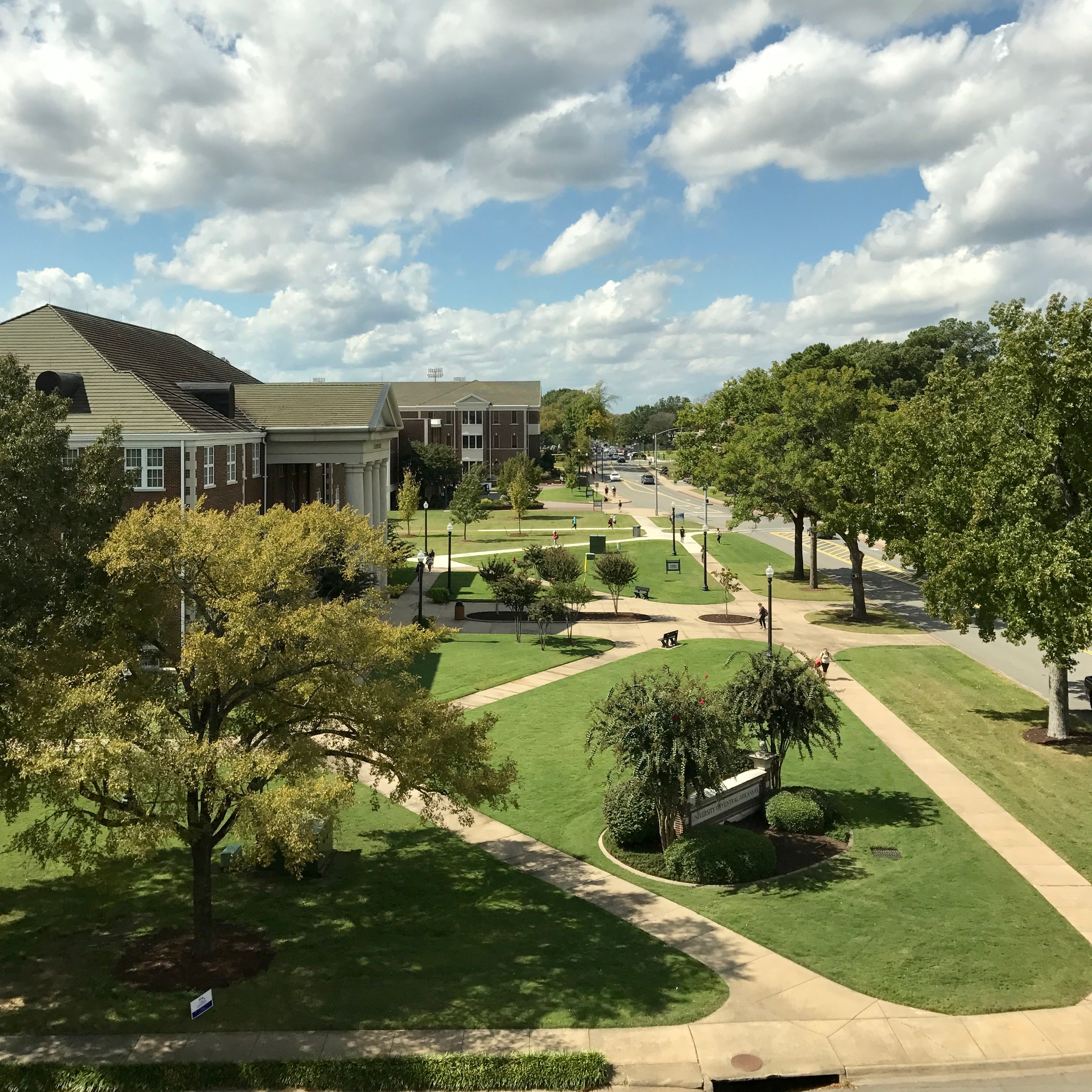
UCA along Bruce Street

Conway is home to three institutions of higher learning, earning it the nickname City of Colleges:

- The University of Central Arkansas is a public research university with an enrollment of approximately 12,000 students. It is well known for its Norbert O. Schedler Honors College, being one of the first and most-modeled-after honor colleges in the United States.
- Hendrix College is a nationally recognized private liberal arts college with an enrollment just over 1,300 students. With an average composite ACT score of 29, it is the highest of any college in the state.
- Central Baptist College is a four-year private liberal arts college with an enrollment of nearly 900 students.

These colleges together contribute to over 40 percent of Conway's adult workforce having a bachelor's degree or higher, making it one of the most educated cities in the state.

=== Primary and secondary education ===
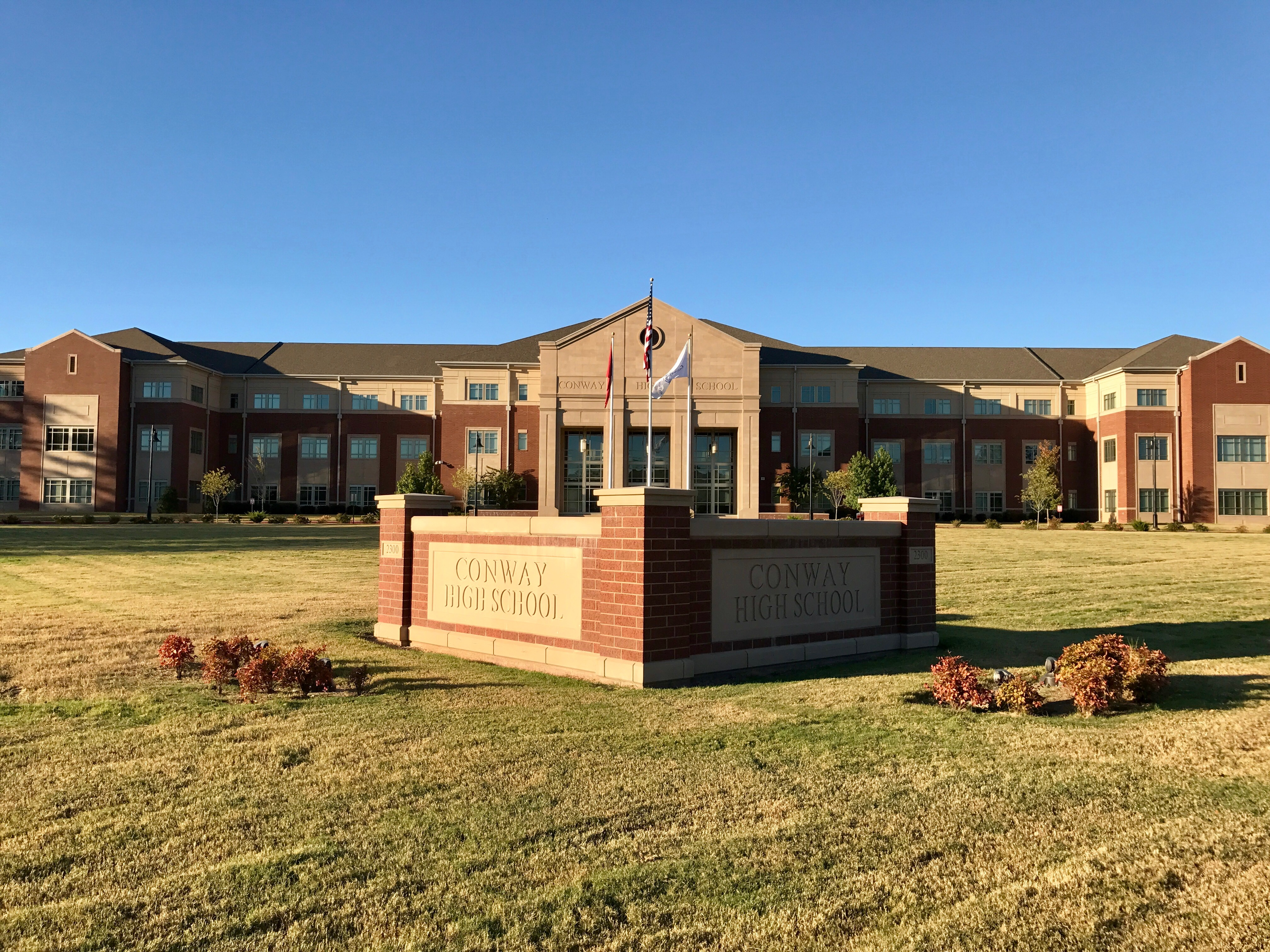
Conway High School

The majority of the city limits is in the Conway Public School District. The school district is overseen by the Conway Board of Education, composed of seven citizens elected every third Tuesday in September annually in a citywide vote. Operating with a $88 million budget, the district enrolls approximately 10,000 students, making it the eighth largest in the state. The district consists of 16 schools: 1 pre-school, 9 elementary schools, 4 middle schools, 1 junior high school, and 1 high school. Over 65 percent of teachers in Conway Public Schools hold a master's degree or higher, and 67 are National Board Certified.

A portion of southwest Conway extends into the Mayflower School District, and a small piece of Conway to the north extends into the Greenbrier School District

Conway is also served by two private religious schools, Conway Christian School and St. Joseph Catholic School. Conway Christian has an approximate enrollment of 400 students, while St. Joseph School enrolls about 500 students. Conway previously had a Catholic grade school for black children, Good Shepherd School; it closed in 1965.

== Transportation ==
Rock Region Metro has provided dial-a-ride transit services within the city since October 24, 2022. Prior to that, no transit service existed in the city. Conway remains the largest city in Arkansas without fixed-route transit services.

Conway is located along Interstate 40 along with US Route 65 and US Route 64.

== Notable people ==
- Kris Allen, winner of American Idol Season 8
- Kayle Browning, silver medalist in the 2020 Olympics in trap shooting
- Monte Coleman, NFL linebacker; Washington Redskins 1979–94, three-time Super Bowl champion, attended the University of Central Arkansas 1975–1978
- Tyree Davis, professional football player
- Willie Davis, NFL wide receiver; Kansas City Chiefs 1991–95, Houston Oilers 1996, Tennessee Oilers 1997–98, attended the University of Central Arkansas 1987–90; older brother of Tyree Davis
- Marvin Delph, Arkansas Razorback basketball player; one of the famed "Triplets" who led Hogs to 1978 NCAA Final Four
- George Washington Donaghey, former Arkansas Governor from 1909 to 1913
- Hetty Jane Dunaway, actress and founder of Dunaway Gardens, born in Conway
- Les Eaves, state representative for White County since 2015; born in Conway
- Erin Enderlin, country music artist and songwriter
- Orval Faubus, 36th Governor of Arkansas; resided in his later years in Conway
- Jacob Ford, NFL defensive end, Tennessee Titans 2007–10; attended the University of Central Arkansas 2003–06
- Max Frauenthal, Fought for the CSA in the Civil War, leading Conway merchant and founding father of Heber Springs
- Gil Gerard, actor known for title role in the TV series Buck Rogers
- Jack Graham, pastor of Prestonwood Baptist Church, one of the largest Southern Baptist churches in America
- Dre Greenlaw, linebacker for the Arkansas Razorbacks 2015–18, San Francisco 49ers 2019–24, Denver Broncos 2024–present
- Dutch Harrison, golfer
- Gene Hatfield, artist and writer
- Peyton Hillis, NFL running back; Arkansas Razorbacks 2004–07, Denver Broncos 2008–10, Cleveland Browns 2010–2011, Kansas City Chiefs 2012, New York Giants 2013–14
- V. E. Howard, Church of Christ minister who founded the radio International Gospel Hour; was a clergyman early in his career in Conway
- James D. Johnson (d. 2010), late Chief Justice of the Arkansas Supreme Court and 1966 Democratic gubernatorial nominee
- Guy H. Jones, Arkansas state senator
- Bryce Molder, PGA Tour professional golfer
- Rob Morgan, racing driver
- Hiroyuki Nishimura, founded the Japanese website 2channel while studying at the University of Central Arkansas
- Scottie Pippen, NBA basketball forward, Chicago Bulls 1987-98 and 2003–2004, Houston Rockets 1998–99, Portland Trail Blazers 1999–2003, six-time NBA champion, considered one of the 50 greatest NBA players of all time; attended the University of Central Arkansas
- Elijah Pitts, NFL running back; Green Bay Packers 1960s; rushed for two TDs in Super Bowl I
- Stanley Russ, Arkansas state senator
- Charlie Strong, NCAA Head football coach of The University of South Florida Bulls; (1980–1983) letterman as a defensive back at the University of Central Arkansas
- Little Johnny Taylor, blues and soul singer
- Ray Thornton, former U.S. congressman and former justice of the Arkansas Supreme Court
- Jordan Wicks, former Conway High School and Kansas State alumnus. First round (pick #21) selection (2021 Major League Baseball draft), for the Chicago Cubs organization

== Sister cities ==
Conway has one official sister city agreement with the city of Quakenbrueck, Germany. In 1986, the first exchange of visitors occurred between the cities. Starting in 1992, Dr. Oudekerk, a professor from Hendrix College, has taken several groups to the sister city in Germany. Since then, the high schools of each city have exchanged students to experience different cultures. The 25-year anniversary of the relationship was recently celebrated with a festival in Quakenbrueck with the theme of building bridges across the Atlantic.

- Quakenbrueck, Lower Saxony, Germany – 1985
