= 1954 Arkansas gubernatorial election =

- November 2, 1954
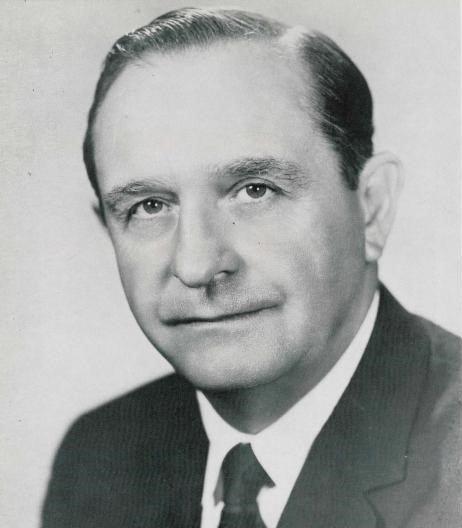

Nominee	Orval Faubus	Pratt C. Remmel
Party	Democratic	Republican
Popular vote	208,121	127,004
Percentage	62.09%	37.89%
- County results Faubus: 50–60% 60–70% 70–80% 80–90% Remmel: 50–60%
Governor before election
Francis Cherry
Democratic
Elected Governor
Orval Faubus
Democratic

The 1954 Arkansas gubernatorial election was held on November 2, 1954.

Incumbent Democratic Governor Francis Cherry was narrowly defeated in the Democratic primary. Cherry was only one of four Arkansas governors in the twentieth century denied initial second terms in office; the others were Tom Terral in 1926, Bill Clinton in 1980, and Frank White in 1982. Only one previous governor, Henry Rector in 1862, was defeated after one term.

Democratic nominee Orval Faubus defeated Republican nominee Pratt C. Remmel with 62.09% of the vote.

== Primary elections ==
Primary elections were held on July 27, 1954, with the Democratic runoff held on August 10, 1954.

=== Democratic primary ===
==== Candidates ====
- Francis Cherry, incumbent Governor
- Orval Faubus, newspaper publisher, former executive secretary to Governor Sid McMath, and former Director of State Highway Commission
- Guy H. Jones, State Senator
- Gus McMillan, real estate dealer

==== Results ====
Results map of the Democratic primary by county Cherry: 30–40% 40–50% 50–60% 60–70% 70–80% 80–90% Faubus: 30–40% 40–50% 50–60% 60–70% 70–80% 80–90% <90% Jones: 40–50% 60–70% McMillan: 50–60%

Democratic primary results
Party	Candidate	Votes	%
Democratic	Francis Cherry (incumbent)	154,879	47.71
Democratic	Orval Faubus	109,614	33.77
Democratic	Guy H. Jones	41,249	12.71
Democratic	Gus McMillan	18,857	5.81
Total votes		324,599	100.00

Results map of the Democratic primary by county Faubus: 50–60% 60–70% 70–80% 80–90% <90% Cherry: 50–60% 60–70% 70–80%

Democratic primary run-off results
Party	Candidate	Votes	%
Democratic	Orval Faubus	191,328	50.91
Democratic	Francis Cherry (incumbent)	184,509	49.09
Total votes		375,837	100.00

== General election ==
=== Candidates ===
- Orval Faubus, Democratic
- Pratt C. Remmel, Republican, Former insurance executive, Mayor of Little Rock

=== Results ===
Remmel's showing against Faubus was the best showing by a non-Democrat since 1888 and by a Republican since 1872.

1954 Arkansas gubernatorial election
Party	Candidate	Votes	%	±%
Democratic	Orval Faubus	208,121	62.09%	−25.32%
Republican	Pratt C. Remmel	127,004	37.89%	+25.30%
Scattering		51	0.02%	+0.02%
Majority		81,117	24.20%	
Turnout		335,176	100.00%	
Democratic hold		Swing		

== Bibliography ==
- Gubernatorial Elections, 1787-1997. Washington, D.C.: Congressional Quarterly Inc. 1998. ISBN 1-56802-396-0.
