= Roscoe–Dunaway Gardens Historic District =

Historic district in the U.S. state of Georgia

- U.S. National Register of Historic Places
- U.S. Historic district

- Location within Metro Atlanta
- Location: bounded by Atlanta in the north and Newnan in the south.
- Coordinates: 33°28′40″N 84°49′16″W
- Built: 1925-1949, 1900-1924, 1875-1899, 1850-1874, 1825-1849
- Architect: Wayne P. Sewell, Hetty Jane Dunaway, Monroe and Cagle
- Architectural style: Queen Anne, Bungalow/Craftsman
- NRHP reference No.: 96001414
- Added to NRHP: 1996

The Roscoe–Dunaway Gardens Historic District is a rock and floral garden located south of the historic town of Roscoe in Coweta County, Georgia, and the adjacent Dunaway Gardens. Part of the district is located in Fulton County. Seventy-nine buildings and two other structures contribute to the historic district.

== History ==
The land that became the gardens belonged to the family of Wayne Pendleton Sewell. Sewell was an actor and booking agent and he married the successful actress, Hetty Jane Dunaway, in 1916.

Her husband wanted to return to his family's land and Dunaway had not been keen. It was said that she was told that she could do anything at the property she wanted. Hetty Jane Dunaway spent eighteen years overseeing construction of Dunaway Gardens, a "theater-garden" on her husband's family's former plantation in rural Georgia. She employed architects and a full-time stone mason for a decade. The gardens included twelve spring-fed pools, a waterfall, sunken and hanging gardens and a thousand-seat amphitheatre. The swimming pool was created by using explosives to make a hole in granite.

Dunaway opened the new grounds in 1934 as part of a performing arts training program for performers and other theater professionals. There was a Honeymoon House where visitors could stay and the Blue Bonnet Tea Rooms served up meals. The customers included Roy Disney and Walt Disney and Tallulah Bankhead.

One local historian noted that television and improved roads, which enabled people to travel to Atlanta to eat and see shows, reduced the interest in Dunaway Gardens through the 1950s. It closed in the 1960s.

A few years after Dunaway's death, the gardens closed and they deteriorated under an overgrowth of kudzu and an outbreak of arson. The gardens were rediscovered by Jennifer Bigham and she and her family bought the gardens, and a buffer zone, to use as their own second home. It was purchased in 2000, restored and reopened in 2003 after the Bighams gradually uncovered the lost attractions of the former gardens, theaters and swimming pool. The family had been intrigued by their discoveries and they decided to invest more of their savings in restoring the garden's attractions. The site was opened to tourists and for weddings and the gardens are on the National Register of Historic Places.
