= Virco =

American furniture manufacturer

Virco Manufacturing Corporation
- Type: Public
- Traded as: Nasdaq: VIRC
- Industry: Furniture manufacturing School furnishings retailer
- Founded: 1950; 76 years ago Los Angeles, California, U.S.
- Founder: Julian Virtue
- Headquarters: Torrance, California, U.S.
- Area served: United States and Canada
- Key people: Robert A. Virtue - Chairman of the Board and CEO; Douglas A. Virtue - President
- Revenue: ▼$191.1 million (FY 2019)
- Operating income: ▲$5.92 million (FY 2019)
- Net income: ▲$2.34 million (FY 2019)
- Total assets: ▲138.99 million (FY 2019)
- Total equity: ▼54.82 million (FY 2019)
- Owner: Virtue Family (34.4%)
- Number of employees: ▼825 (FY 2019)
- Divisions: Virsan SA de CV (former)
- Website: virco.com

The Virco Manufacturing Corporation, more commonly known as Virco, is an American furniture manufacturer based in Torrance, California which focuses on providing products for educational markets. The principal products of the company include student desks and activity tables, school and office seating, computer stations, lightweight folding tables, and upholstered chairs.

== History ==
=== Foundation and early years ===
Prior to founding Virco, Julian Virtue had cofounded Virtue Chrome Plating (later known as Virtue Brothers Manufacturing Company) with his brother Philip Virtue in August 1926. This company was quite successful, initially providing custom nickel and chrome plating for furniture manufacturers. By the mid-1930s, the company began to directly manufacture its own furniture from its factory on West Century Boulevard, producing dinette sets for restaurants and consumer homes, chrome-plated chairs for offices, and beauty-parlor equipment. During World War II, the company became a significant supplier of furniture for the military, providing furniture for the sleeping quarters and mess halls of US Navy ships, and thousands of bunkbeds for US Army and Marine barracks. Even after the conclusion of the war, the company remained a significant military contractor, while also expanding further into the consumer furniture market. However, due to a disagreement between the brothers, Julian Virtue left the company. After dividing their assets, Julian got a check for $1,000,000 and Philip continued to run Virtue Brothers.

In February 1950, Virco was founded by Julian Virtue in Los Angeles, California, opening its first factory on Vermont Avenue. To avoid starting his new business entirely from scratch, Virtue also purchased the Slauson Aircraft Company in 1950. Despite its name, in the post-World War II peacetime economy, Slauson Aircraft had become a school furniture maker and held a lucrative contract with the Los Angeles School Districts. This acquisition quickly allowed Virco to become the leading manufacturer of school equipment in the Greater Los Angeles area.

=== Growth and expansion ===
Virco further expanded in 1954 with the purchase of the Dunn Furniture Company in Conway, Arkansas. This purchase established a nationwide presence for the company, allowing for sales along both the East Coast and West Coast and increasing their sales volume significantly. Julian's son Robert joined the company in 1956, after having graduated from college and serving in the navy. He rose up the corporate ladder and began working quite closely with his father in the management of the company.

In 1964, became a publicly traded company. With increasing competition and rising labor costs hurting profit margins, the company decided to expand its operations internationally. In 1971, they opened a new factory in San Luis Río Colorado, Mexico directly across the border from Yuma, Arizona. This new facility, operated under the maquiladora concept, helped to drive down labor costs for the company. This, in turn, increased company profitability and allowed it to grow large enough to be listed on the American Stock Exchange in 1977.

The 1980s and early 1990s were a time of continued growth for the company, as well as leadership change. Facilities in Conway not only had their manufacturing capacities increased, but also became distribution and packing centers. Meanwhile, the factory in Mexico grew to nearly 1,200 workers. The company also purchased a 55,000-square-foot facility in Newport, Tennessee from the struggling Heywood-Wakefield Company in 1984. This facility, used for the manufacture of melamine plastic chair seats, soon employed 200 workers. Julian Virtue also semi-retired from the company, with his son Robert becoming president in 1982. Julian died in December 1991, with Robert having taken over as CEO and chairman of the board in 1988 and 1990, respectively.

=== Recent struggles ===
In recent years, the company has struggled financially due to the declines in public school funding. The company has also faced increased competition as school and government contracts have increasingly been awarded to local furniture suppliers. As a result, company revenue and profitability has fluctuated greatly over the past twenty years.

The company relocated to its current facility in Torrance in April 1994, shutting down two Los Angeles area facilities in an effort to reduce handling and distribution expenses. These facilities, a 200,000-square-foot warehouse and a 160,000-square-foot manufacturing facility, were sold off in April 2000 and November 2003, respectively. In 1995, the factory in Mexico was shut down after being damaged by a minor fire in 1993 and in an effort to further reduce operating margins. The company's Newport facility was shut down and donated to the Newport Cocke County Economic Development Commission in 2002.

== Corporate affairs ==
=== Finances ===
In the fiscal year 2019, Virco had net sales of around $191 million, with a net income of approximately $2 million. In the preceding fiscal year, the company had net sales of $201 million, with a net loss of around $2 million. The company has occasionally paid out dividends, with five such distributions occurring between December 2017 and December 2018, after 7 years without such distributions.

Virco primarily operates in two countries, the United States where it derived 93.6% of its revenue, and Canada which was responsible for much of the remaining 6.4% of revenue. Virco reportedly supplies between 50 and 60% of school furniture within Los Angeles County. It was estimated in 1997 that Virco controlled a majority of the educational furniture market in the United States.

=== Financial struggles ===
Virco's financial performance peaked in the late 1990s, reaching a record stock price of $17.50 a share in February 1998. Profits also peaked in 1998, with the company turning a profit of nearly $18 million on revenues of $275 million. Revenue continued to grow until 2000, when it peaked at $287 million. Since 2000, the company has struggled with declining revenues which have made it difficult to remain consistently profitable. In the past 20 years, revenue has fluctuated between a low of $158 million in 2012 to $229 million in 2007, averaging around $200 million a year. In the seventeen years since 2002, the company has turned a profit in seven years, with losses exceeding $20 million in 2003. (Note: The company incurred losses in 2003, 2004, 2005, 2009, 2010, 2011, 2012, 2013, 2017, and 2018. It turned a profit in 2006, 2007, 2008, 2014, 2015, 2016, and 2019.) While Virco has successfully reduced costs in recent years, profitability for the company remains, in part, dependent on the cost of raw material purchases. Volatility in the international markets for materials such as steel, plastic, and wood has resulted in cost increases which the company has not always been able to offset through increasing the price of its products. The tariffs announced under the "America First" policy of the Trump administration in 2018 were recognized as leading to a significant increase in the cost of steel purchases for the company.

These financial woes led to significant reductions in the number of permanent employees. The number of employees peaked at nearly 2,950 in August 2000. A voluntary separation program in 2003 led to the departure of 485 employees while an additional 160 employees were laid off. Further cost-trimming measures instituted by cutting labor costs brought the number of employees from 1,045 in 2011 to 825 at the beginning of 2020, a more than 70% workforce reduction since 2000. The company supplements this reduced full-time workforce with temporary workers that help with seasonal production bumps in the summer months, sometimes utilizing around 200–300 temporary workers.

=== Management ===
Robert Virtue is the current chairman of the board and CEO of Virco. Born in 1932, he joined the company full-time in 1956 and is the son of the company's founder, Julian Virtue. Douglas (Doug) Virtue, the son of Robert, is the current president of the company, having been appointed to the position in 2014. He joined the company in 1984.

In 2014, the board of directors was reorganized and reduced in size to five seats from nine seats. However, by 2020 there were eight seats on the board of directors.

=== Environmental initiatives ===
Virco has engaged in a number of environmental initiatives, with these efforts receiving recognition from local, state, and federal authorities. Doug Virtue, Virco's president and a director on the Mono Lake Committee, has been influential in this drive towards more environmentally conscious business practices, stating in 2002 that sustainability is "the state towards which all business must evolve." The company began a recycling program in 1989, and by 2010 the company had processed over 313 million pounds of recyclable materials spanning more than 40 categories.

Virco has made significant efforts to restrict chemical emissions from its products, becoming the first classroom manufacturers to have their product lines to meet GREENGUARD indoor air quality certification for children and schools. By 2005, hundreds of the companies products were indoor air quality certified with these products accounting for 75% of the company's sales volume. With a desire to become largely waste-free, Virco also completed a transition from wet paint lines to powder by 2002.

At the local level, Virco has been recognized by the Sanitation Districts of Los Angeles County as a "Good Corporate Citizen" in limiting its wastewater discharge and maintaining their environmental equipment without any violations. At the state level, Virco has repeatedly been recognized by the California Integrated Waste Management Board in their Waste Reduction Awards Program for its efforts to recycle waste and success in diverting waste from landfills. Finally, Virco is a member of the U.S. Environmental Protection Agency's WasteWise program, joining as a charter member in 1994. Virco remains an active member in the WasteWise program, receiving numerous awards and being selected as one of the first three charter members in the WasteWise Hall of Fame in 2003. Virco has also received environmental awards from the United States General Services Administration, Sierra Club, and National Recycling Coalition.

== Facilities ==
Virco currently has manufacturing facilities in two states, California and Arkansas. In Torrance, California, the company has leased a 560,000-square-foot facility since 1994 which includes the corporate headquarters and a showroom. The facility is also used for manufacturing, distribution, and warehousing. In Conway, Arkansas, the company owns three facilities for manufacturing and distribution. The primary facility contains 1.2 million square foot and is used for warehousing, manufacturing, and office space. The company also owns a 375,000-square-foot factory in Conway, purchased in 1954, used for chrome plating, manufacturing steel components, and plastic molding. The third property owned in Conway is a 175,000-square-foot facility used for the manufacturing of hard plastic mold components and was purchased in 2017.

== See also ==
- Herman Miller (manufacturer)
- La-Z-Boy
