= Asa P. Robinson =

Founder of Conway, Arkansas, US (1822–1898)

Asa Peter Hosmer Robinson (1822–1898) was the founder of Conway, Arkansas.

== Early life ==
Asa Peter Hosmer Robinson was born on October 10, 1822, in Hartford County, Connecticut, to Ludyah and Sophia Eliza (née Hosmer) Robinson. He was the eldest of seven children. His father became a prominent businessman in Newburg, New York. Robinson attended the local schools of Newburg and studied civil engineering in college. He married Lucy Blodgett in New York in 1845. Lucy died in 1859.

== Career ==
Robinson became a "rodman" in surveying the route of the Erie Railroad. Following the American Civil War, he accompanied a cavalry expedition from the banks of the Missouri River to the city of Denver, Colorado. Robinson then journeyed to Kansas where he worked for the Missouri, Kansas & Texas Railroad.

In 1869 Robinson came to Arkansas to construct the first twenty miles (32 km) of the St. Louis, Iron Mountain and Southern Railway. He then became the chief railroad engineer for the Little Rock and Fort Smith Railroad. In connection with his work on the Little Rock & Fort Smith Robinson received one square mile of land south of the Cadron Ridge in Faulkner County, extending south roughly from what is today Prince Street to Dave Ward Drive. He reserved the northeast corner of his property for the establishment of a town site, and the southern half as private hunting lands and as a plantation for raising shorthorn cattle, hogs, and sheep. Robinson drove a stake in the ground at the place where Conway Station was to be constructed.

A post office was built at Cadron Gap, but later transferred to Conway Station in 1872. The station became the county seat of Faulkner County in 1873. One year later Robinson married his second wife, Mary Louise De St. Louis of Montreal, Canada. Conway, Arkansas, was incorporated in 1875, and Robinson was elected the town's mayor in 1887. He also became president of the local school board. He personally pledged land for the courthouse square, and several local churches. He was actively engaged in Republican politics. In 1884, Robinson laid out the federal Hot Springs Reservation.

== Death and legacy ==
Robinson died in Conway, Arkansas, on October 12, 1898, two days after his 76th birthday. Robinson Avenue in Conway is named in his honor.

== See also ==
- List of mayors of Conway, Arkansas
