= Nabholz Construction =

- Type: General Contractor
- Industry: Construction Management, General Contracting
- Founded: 1949
- Founder: Robert D. Nabholz
- Headquarters: Conway, Arkansas, United States
- Number of locations: Arkansas, Oklahoma, Missouri, Kansas, Mississippi, Tennessee, Connecticut
- Area served: Regional
- Key people: Charles Nabholz; Jake Nabholz; Greg Fogle; Bryan Bruich; Don Greenland
- Products: Preconstruction Consulting; General Construction; Construction Management; Millwork; Concrete; Industrial Services
- Number of employees: 1600+ (2024)
- Divisions: Nabholz Construction Services; Nabholz Industrial Services; Nabholz Special Projects; Nabholz Excavation
- Website: www.nabholz.com

Nabholz Construction is a commercial general contractor and construction management company with offices in the U.S. states of Arkansas, Oklahoma, Missouri, Kansas, Mississippi, Tennessee, and Connecticut.

== Overview ==
According to their website, "Nabholz offers a variety of specialized service groups and delivery formats, providing a complete construction and management services for almost any size and type of building program."

As of 2006, Nabholz Construction was ranked as the 3rd largest Commercial Contractor in Arkansas.

== History ==
Nabholz began almost by accident. Back in 1949, R. D. "Bob" Nabholz was building a home for his future bride. Another gentleman made an offer on the home, which Bob accepted – using the profits to build more houses and, later, duplexes. Commercial projects followed, and Nabholz Construction was born.

The company was a family endeavor from the beginning, with brothers Bob, Ed, Tom and Charles all contributing to the growing business. In 1951, the company's in-house millwork shop was established and, four years later, Nabholz Construction was incorporated in the state of Arkansas.

Just ten years after Bob's original home sale, Nabholz Construction celebrated its first $1 million project for Arkansas Children's Colony.

In 1961, the Nabholz brothers recognized a need within the industry for pre-engineered metal buildings. Charles Nabholz formed Conark Builders, a merit shop general contractor focusing on pre-engineered metal building applications. The company began with several medical clinic projects, and then progressed to larger commercial construction. It was incorporated just one year later in 1962.

As both companies grew, the brothers realized that encouraging a foundation of skilled craftsmen would benefit the entire industry. So, in the early 1970s, they developed in-house carpentry and bricklaying apprenticeship programs, now known as Nabholz University. They were the first contractor-sponsored apprenticeship programs approved by the United States Department of Labor in Arkansas, and have grown into an important center of industry education. Nabholz University has produced more than 100 journeyman carpenters to date.

Around 1976, Nabholz Construction transitioned into a merit shop general contracting company. By this time, the Nabholz team had earned a reputation in the construction community, working closely with customers and operating with uncompromising integrity. In 1985, Nabholz was listed among the Engineering News-Record Top 400 Building Contractors, and has been a fixture on that list ever since.

The 1990s brought growth for Nabholz. In 1990, the company reached $100 million in sales for the first time. That same year, Nabholz Client Service was established and Nabholz Construction expanded into the Northwest Arkansas and Oklahoma markets. Northwest Excavation and Nabholz Industrial Services were founded in 1993, followed by more expansion as the company entered the Missouri market in 1996, Kansas in 2004 and Northeast Arkansas in 2005.

It has been listed by Engineering News Record (ENR) magazine as one of the Top 400 General Contractors every year since 1986, in 2022 the company is ranked #100.

== Nabholz University ==
Nabholz University was founded in 1973 and was the first non-union accredited carpentry apprenticeship program in the state of Arkansas.

It has recently grown into the department that handles all of Nabholz Construction's training needs.

== Green Initiative ==
In 2002, Nabholz became a member of the U.S. Green Building Council. In 2008, the company was ranked by ENR magazine at #90 on the list of Top Green Contractors in the United States.

Nabholz Construction created a position specifically for their Sustainable Initiative in 2007 and is currently held by Mary Laurie.
