= Tab Townsell =

American politician

Bobby Tab Townsell
- Incumbent
- Assumed office 2017
- Preceded by: Jim McKenzie

Personal details
- Children: One
- Education: University of Central Arkansas; Texas Christian University
- Website: TabTownsell.com

Tab Townsell is the former executive director of Metroplan and former Mayor of Conway, Arkansas for 18 years.

== Personal life and education ==
Townsell graduated from Conway High School in 1979. He graduated from the University of Central Arkansas in 1984, with a major in political science and a minor in economics. Townsell earned an MBA from Texas Christian University in 1986.

== Career ==
Townsell worked as an intern for Senator Dale Bumpers, and served on Conway's Transportation Advisory Committee and the Conway Planning Commission prior to becoming mayor. Townsell worked in construction, first for Townsell-Hill Construction and then as a co-owner of Concrete Forming. Townsell was re-elected in 2012 to a fifth term, but has announced that he won't seek a sixth term. Alongside Conway business leaders, Townsell helped legalize liquor sales in Conway and pushed through a city re-development plan.

In August 2016, he was selected by the Metroplan board of directors as the agency's next executive director.

== See also ==
- List of mayors of Conway, Arkansas
