= The Kudzu Queen (play) =

2016 play written by Gwenyfar Rohler

The Kudzu Queen is a 2016 play written by Gwenyfar Rohler. It is an adaptation of Wiley Cash's short story "Grenadine". It was directed by Beth Swindell. The play was staged by TheatreNOW as part of a way to support local North Carolina authors.

== Plot summary ==
The play takes place partly in 1942, when Grenadine Purdy wins the Kudzu Queen pageant to promote the introduction of kudzu. The other part of the play takes place in 1968 when the Purdy family has built up a profitable kudzu business.
