= The Kudzu Queen (book) =

2018 novel by Mimi Herman

- Author: Mimi Herman
- Genre: Historical fiction
- Published: 2018

The Kudzu Queen is a 2018 novel by Mimi Herman.

== Plot summary ==
Mattie Lee Watson, a young girl from Pinesboro, Cooper County, witnesses the arrival James T. Cullowee, an unscrupulous kudzu salesman, in 1941. James' sharp attire and charm win over Mattie and the rest of the town, and Mattie eagerly joins the Kudzu Queen pageant that he organizes to promote the plant.

== Background ==
The novel is set in North Carolina during the 1940s. It is inspired by the real history of kudzu introduction and kudzu festivals in the American South.

== Reception ==
The book received positive reviews from critics. Donna Meredith of The Southern Literary Review wrote that "This beautifully written coming-of-age novel will remedy any shortcomings in readers’ knowledge because Herman’s thorough research is woven effectively and unobtrusively into the story." Kate Braithwaite of the Historical Novel Society praised the characterization and believable setting.
