= Stanley Russ =

American politician

President pro tempore of the Arkansas Senate
- In office 1995–1997

Member of the Arkansas Senate from the 21st (later 30th) district
- In office January 28, 1975 – January 8, 2001
- Preceded by: Guy H. Jones
- Succeeded by: Gilbert Baker

Personal details
- Born: Otis Stanley Russ; August 31, 1930 Conway, Arkansas, United States
- Died: January 5, 2017 (aged 86) Conway, Arkansas
- Party: Democratic
- Spouse: Nina Benton (m. 1951; died 2005)
- Children: 2
- Education: University of Arkansas

Military service
- Allegiance: United States
- Branch/service: United States Army
- Years of service: July 1952 – July 1954

Otis Stanley Russ (August 31, 1930 – January 5, 2017) was an American politician who served in the Arkansas Senate from 1975 until 2001.

== Early life ==
Russ was born in Conway, Arkansas in 1930 to Otis Stanley Russ and Gene Brown Russ. He attended Arkansas Polytechnic College from 1948 until 1950, transferred to Arkansas State Teachers College in 1950, and then transferred to the University of Arkansas where he graduated in 1952.

In July 1952, Russ enlisted in the United States Army, and served until July 1954. He also served in the Arkansas National Guard until September 1961.

== Political career ==
Russ ran for the Arkansas Senate from the 21st district in 1974, in order to fill the vacancy caused by the expulsion of Guy H. Jones due to tax evasion. He came in second in the primary in January 1975 to Bill Sanson, who was supported by several local officials, but won in the runoff, 9,201–8,799. He won in the general election later that month with 90% of the vote, defeating Republican candidate Chuck Fourth. Russ ran for the United States House of Representatives in 1978 and 1984, but was unsuccessful, losing in the Democratic primary both times.

In 1995, Russ became President Pro Tempore of the Arkansas Senate. Due to his serving in this capacity, he acted as Governor several times while both the governor and the lieutenant governor were absent.

== Personal life ==
Russ married Nina Benton in 1951. They had 2 children, and she died in 2005. He attended Calvary Baptist Church in Conway.

Russ died of cancer on January 5, 2017, at the age of 86. Upon his death, former President and Governor of Arkansas Bill Clinton remarked, "I loved working with him, when we agreed and when we didn't. Throughout his long service in the state Senate, everyone who worked with him held him in high regard."
