= Roscoe, Georgia =

Unincorporated community in Georgia, U.S.

Coordinates: 33.495°N 84.822°W

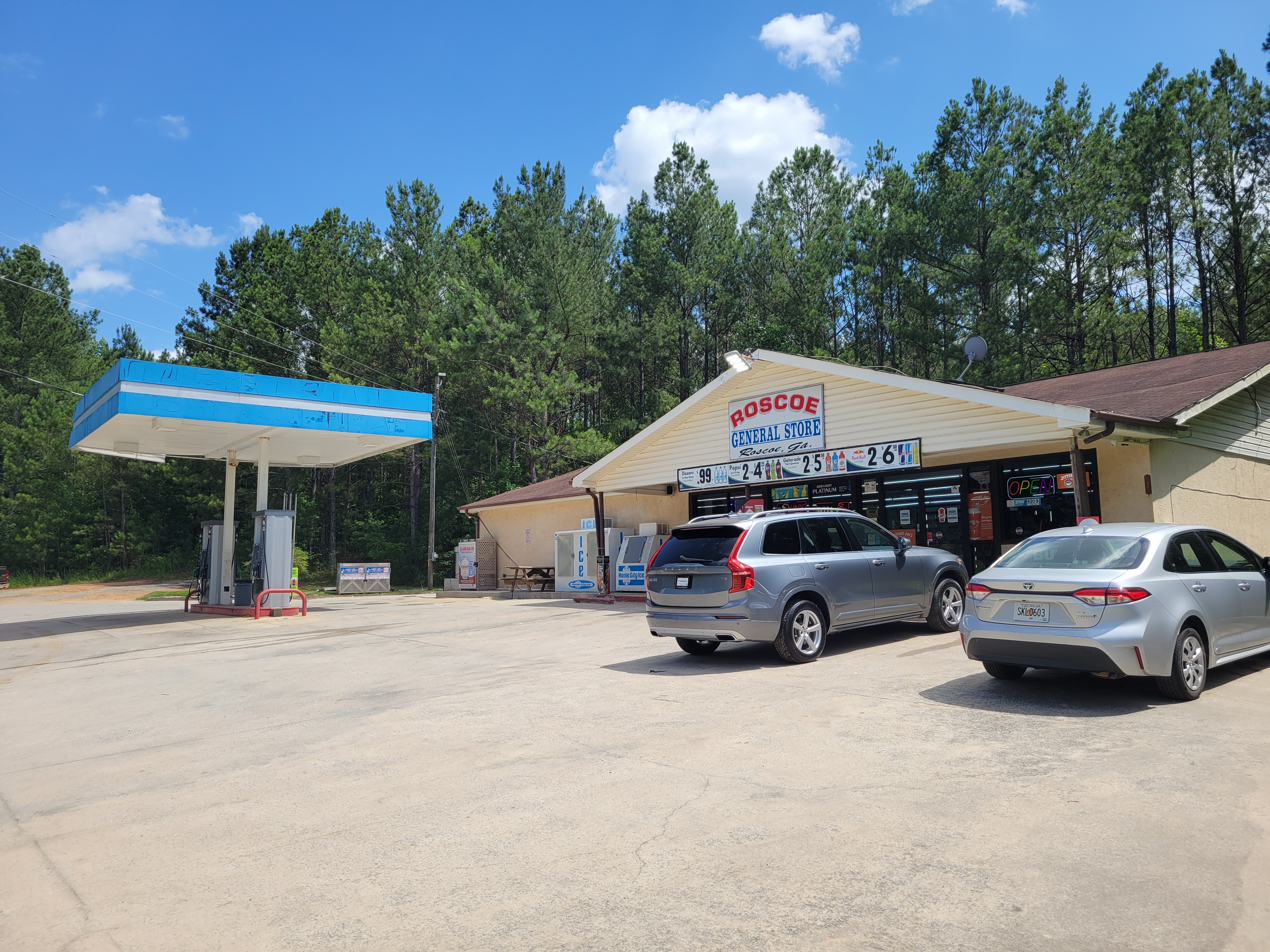
Roscoe General Store

Roscoe is an unincorporated community in Coweta County, in the U.S. state of Georgia. The center of the community is located in the area of the intersection of Georgia State Route 70 (Roscoe Rd) with Hood Rd, Sewell Mill Rd, and Oliver Potts Rd near the local convenient store.

== History ==
A post office called Roscoe was established in 1882, and remained in operation until 1904. The community most likely was named after Roscoe Conkling (1829–1888), a United States Senator from New York who was active in Reconstruction-era politics.

The Roscoe–Dunaway Gardens Historic District in Roscoe was added to the National Register of Historic Places in 1996.
