= Guy H. Jones =

American politician and lawyer (1911–1986)

Guy Hamilton "Mutt" Jones Sr. (June 29, 1911 – August 10, 1986) was a politician and lawyer in Arkansas.

Born in Conway, Arkansas, Jones graduated from Hendrix College in 1932. He received his law degree in 1935 from the William H. Bowen School of Law and then practiced law in Conway, Arkansas.

During World War II, he served in the United States Army in Europe. From 1946 to 1974, Jones served in the Arkansas State Senate.

Jones was convicted of federal income tax evasion in 1973 and was fined $5,000. He was then expelled from the Arkansas Senate in 1974.

Jones was succeeded by Stanley Russ.
