= Little Rock and Fort Smith Railroad =

Former Arkansas railroad

Overview
- Locale: Arkansas
- Dates of operation: 1853–1875

The Little Rock and Fort Smith Railroad was a railroad that operated in the state of Arkansas, United States, between 1853 and 1875. It came to national prominence when its bonds were the subject of a scandal involving Republican presidential candidate James G. Blaine in 1876.

== Operations ==
The original shareholders of the Little Rock and Fort Smith wished to create a mode of transit not limited to the capricious nature of the Arkansas River and saw an opportunity to do so when they received a federal land grant in 1853. Although the road was, as the name suggests, initially intended to connect the cities of Little Rock and Fort Smith, Arkansas, the railroad's president, Jesse Turner, and chief engineer, J.H. Haney, hoped to one day use the road to build a network as far as the Atlantic Ocean. Financial conditions following the Panic of 1857 meant that progress was delayed and by 1860 the railroad was out of money. The Arkansas General Assembly advanced them $38,000 that year, but the outbreak of the American Civil War effectively halted construction the next year.

After the war, the state legislature passed a railroad aid bill in 1867, but Turner believed it would be inadequate to their needs, and sought aid from Northern capitalists. Turner resigned in 1868, but the new president, Charles G. Scott, managed to secure some investors' interest the following year. After replacing some directors to accommodate the investors' demands, the railroad prepared to, at last, begin construction. Construction had been so long delayed that the federal land grant was set to expire, but Arkansas Congressman Logan H. Roots convinced Speaker James G. Blaine to help him to pass a bill extending the deadline to April 28, 1870. The railroad was then re-incorporated and granted $1.5 million in state bonds to aid the construction efforts.

To facilitate construction, Haney hired Asa P. Robinson, a Connecticut-born civil engineer. Robinson effectively took over the construction process and reorganized the labor force, bringing in white laborers from Illinois to replace the black laborers the railroad had already hired. Ironically, the variable flows of the Arkansas River delayed construction further when the river was too low to transport heavy equipment, but by February 1870 the first 20 miles were nearly complete. By April 23, enough track was laid to secure the land grant. By September 29 of that year, thirty-seven miles of track were complete.

Regular passenger service from Little Rock to Lewisburg began on November 21, 1870, a distance of 50 miles. By 1871, the Little Rock and Fort Smith was once again in financial trouble and Robinson resigned as engineer. The company was re-organized again in 1872 and issued new bonds. The tracks extended as far as Clarksville in June 1873, but the railroad was bankrupt by November 1874.

== Blaine and the Mulligan letters ==
Among the Northern investors in the Little Rock and Fort Smith was James G. Blaine, and his alleged sale of the bonds to the Union Pacific Railroad became the subject of a scandal when he was running for President in 1876. Rumors began to spread in February of that year that Blaine had been involved in a transaction with the Union Pacific in which the railroad had paid Blaine $64,000 for some Little Rock and Fort Smith bonds, even though the railroad's financial state rendered the bonds almost worthless; in essence, the alleged transaction was a sham designed to bribe Blaine. Blaine denied the charges, as did the Union Pacific's directors. Blaine claimed he never had any dealings with the Little Rock and Fort Smith except to purchase bonds at market price, and that he had lost money on the transaction. Democrats in the House of Representatives nevertheless demanded a Congressional investigation. The testimony appeared to favor Blaine's version of events until May 31, when James Mulligan, a Boston clerk formerly employed by Blaine's brother-in-law, testified that the allegations were true, that he had arranged the transaction, and that he had letters to prove it. When the investigating committee recessed, Blaine met with Mulligan in his hotel room; what transpired between the men is unknown, but Blaine left with the letters and refused to turn them over to the committee. Blaine emerged from the scandal tarnished, and was unable to secure the Republican nomination in 1876. When he ran again in 1884, the scandal reemerged and harmed his campaign once more.

== Little Rock and Fort Smith Railway ==
The assets of the railroad were sold at foreclosure, and 100.65 miles of road were acquired by the Little Rock and Fort Smith Railway. That line went on to build 65.86 miles of additional road, giving it 166.51 miles of single-track, standard gauge steam railroad line, all in Arkansas. It survived to April 13, 1906, when its assets were sold to its parent, the St. Louis, Iron Mountain and Southern Railway.

== Sources ==
- Crapol, Edward P. (2000). James G. Blaine: Architect of Empire. Biographies in American Foreign Policy. Vol. 4. Wilmington, Delaware: Scholarly Resources. ISBN 0-8420-2604-5.
- Muzzey, David Saville (1934). James G. Blaine: A Political Idol of Other Days. New York, New York: Dodd, Mead, and Company.
- Summers, Mark (2000). Rum, Romanism & Rebellion: The Making of a President, 1884. Chapel Hill, North Carolina: University of North Carolina Press. ISBN 0-8078-2524-7. Archived from the original on 2012-10-07 – via Questia.
- Thompson, George H. (Spring 1980). "Asa P. Robinson and the Little Rock and Fort Smith Railroad". The Arkansas Historical Quarterly. 39 (1): 3–20. doi:10.2307/40023148. JSTOR 40023148.
