= Kudzu Queen pageant =

Kudzu Queen pageants were competitions used to promote kudzu in the Southern United States.

== History ==
After the introduction of kudzu in the United States, it was widely promoted in the South during the 1930s to provide ground cover and replenish the soil. Kudzu festivals were sponsored, often including pageants were held where young women competed to win the title of "Kudzu Queen". Kudzu queens were elected in Auburn, Alabama, and Greensboro, Alabama. By the 1950s, kudzu came to be seen as invasive and harmful, and the pageants stopped being held.
