= Kudzu in the United States =

Plant invasion

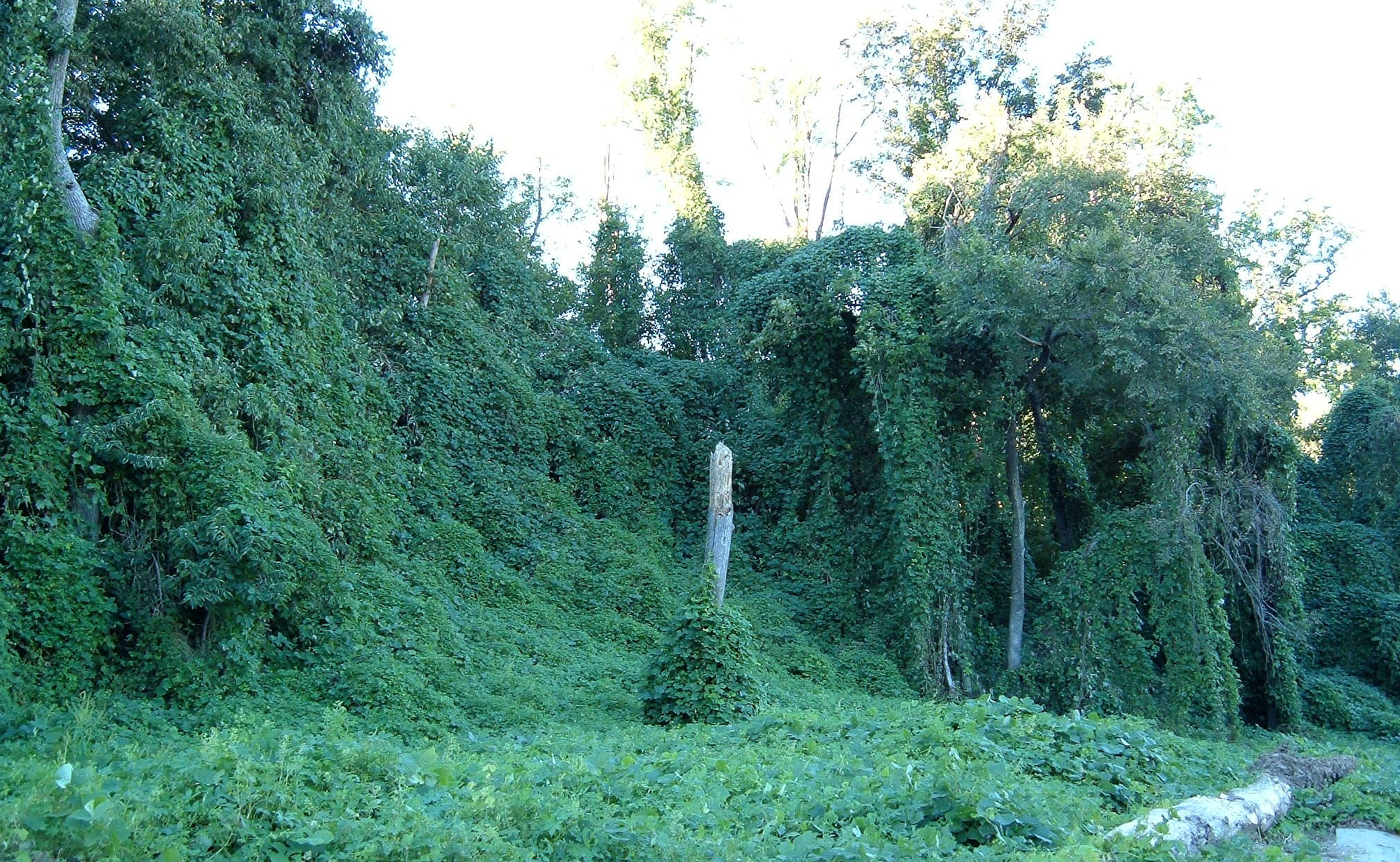
Kudzu smothering trees in Atlanta, Georgia

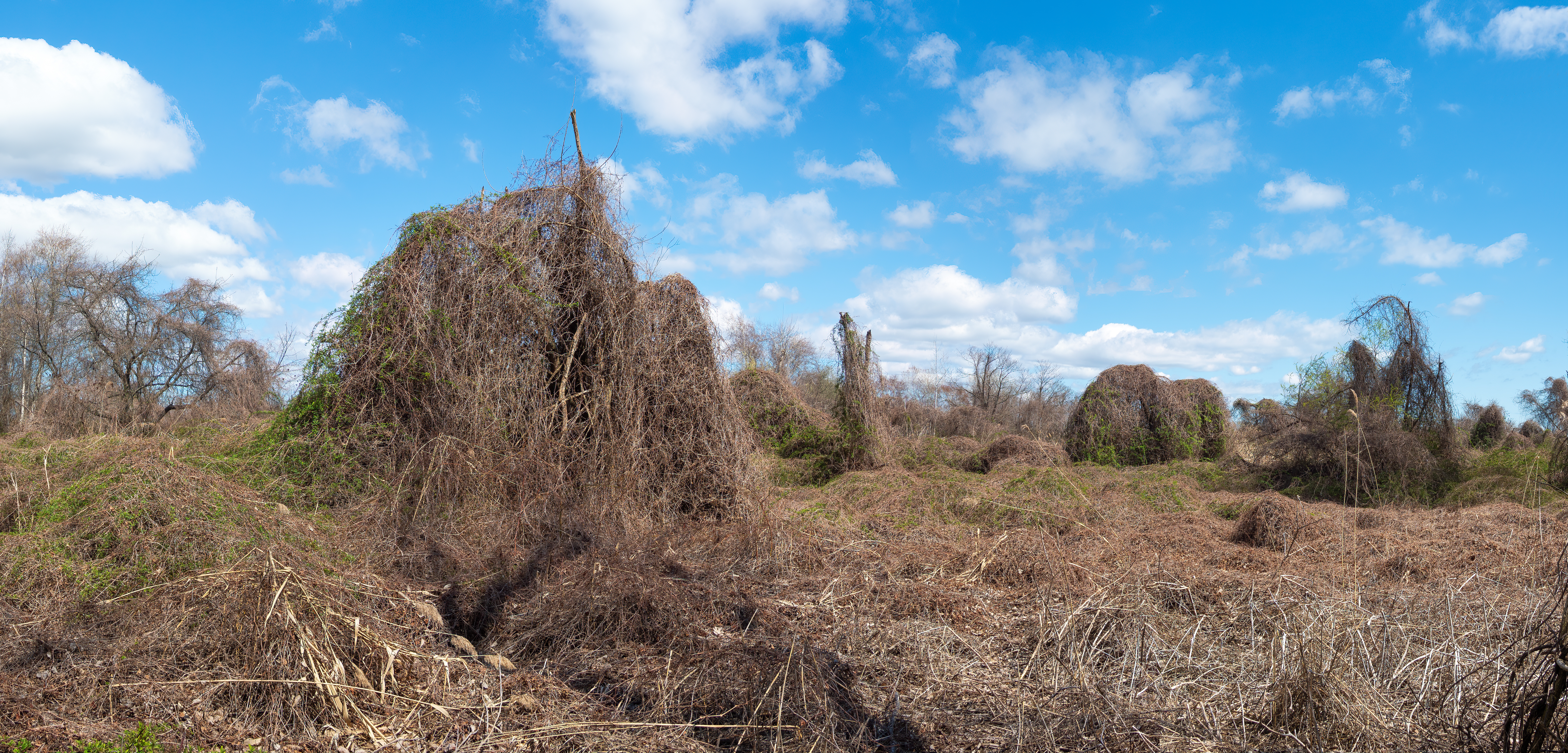
A woodland area of Brooklyn, New York, blanketed by kudzu

Kudzu is an invasive plant species in the United States, introduced from Asia with devastating environmental consequences, earning it the nickname "the vine that ate the South." It has been spreading rapidly in the Southern United States, "easily outpacing the use of herbicide, spraying, and mowing, as well increasing the costs of these controls by $6 million annually." Estimates of the vine's spread vary, from the United States Forest Service's 2015 estimate of 2,500 acres (1,000 ha; 10 km^{2}) per year to the Department of Agriculture's 2009 estimate of as much as 150,000 acres (61,000 ha; 610 km^{2}) annually. Proponents of the newer figure argue that the spread of kudzu has been overblown compared to greater threats such as Asian privet and invasive roses. They argue that kudzu's preference for edge habitats with high sun exposure (such as wooded roadsides) makes it appear more numerous than it actually is to casual observers.

== History and biology ==
=== Description ===
Kudzu is a perennial vine from the bean family Fabaceae and is native to Asia, primarily subtropical and temperate regions of China, Japan, and Korea, with trifoliate leaves composed of three leaflets. Five species in the genus Pueraria (P. montana, P. lobata, P. edulis, P. phaseoloides and P. thomsoni) are closely related and kudzu populations in the United States seem to have ancestry from more than one of the species. Each leaflet is large and ovate with two to three lobes each and hair on the underside. The plant has the ability to fix atmospheric nitrogen, which can supply up to 95% of nitrogen needed for its foliage in poor soils. Along the vines are nodes, points at which stems or tendrils can propagate to increase support and attach to structures. As a twining vine, kudzu uses stems or tendrils that can extend from any node on the vine to attach to and climb most surfaces. In addition, the nodes of the kudzu vine have the ability to root when exposed to soil, further anchoring the vine to the ground. The roots are tuberous and are high in starch and water content, and the twining of the plant allows for less carbon concentration in the construction of woody stems and greater concentration in roots, which aids root growth. The roots can account for up to 40% of total plant biomass.

Kudzu's primary method of reproduction is asexual vegetative spread (cloning) which is aided by the ability to root wherever a stem is exposed to soil. For sexual reproduction, kudzu is entirely dependent on pollinators.

Although kudzu prefers forest regrowth and edge habitats with high sun exposure, the plant can survive in full sun or partial shade. These attributes of kudzu made it attractive as an ornamental plant for shading porches in the southeastern United States, but they facilitated the growth of kudzu as it became a "structural parasite" of the South, enveloping entire structures when untreated and often referred to as "the vine that ate the South."

The word "kudzu" comes from the Japanese word for the plant, 葛, or kuzu.

=== Origin in Asia ===
Kudzu probably originated in Japan or China, where the ecosystem (primarily the tendency of kudzu to experience above-ground die-back over winter) kept the vine from becoming a nuisance, and it is thought to have been introduced to China and likely Korea.

In Japan, kudzu thrives in mountainous regions, ranging from the 44th parallel north (the island of Hokkaido) to the 30th parallel north (the island of Kuchinoshima) and many of the lowlands and the islands. In Korea, kudzu grows in areas where the temperature can drop to −22 °F (−30 °C).

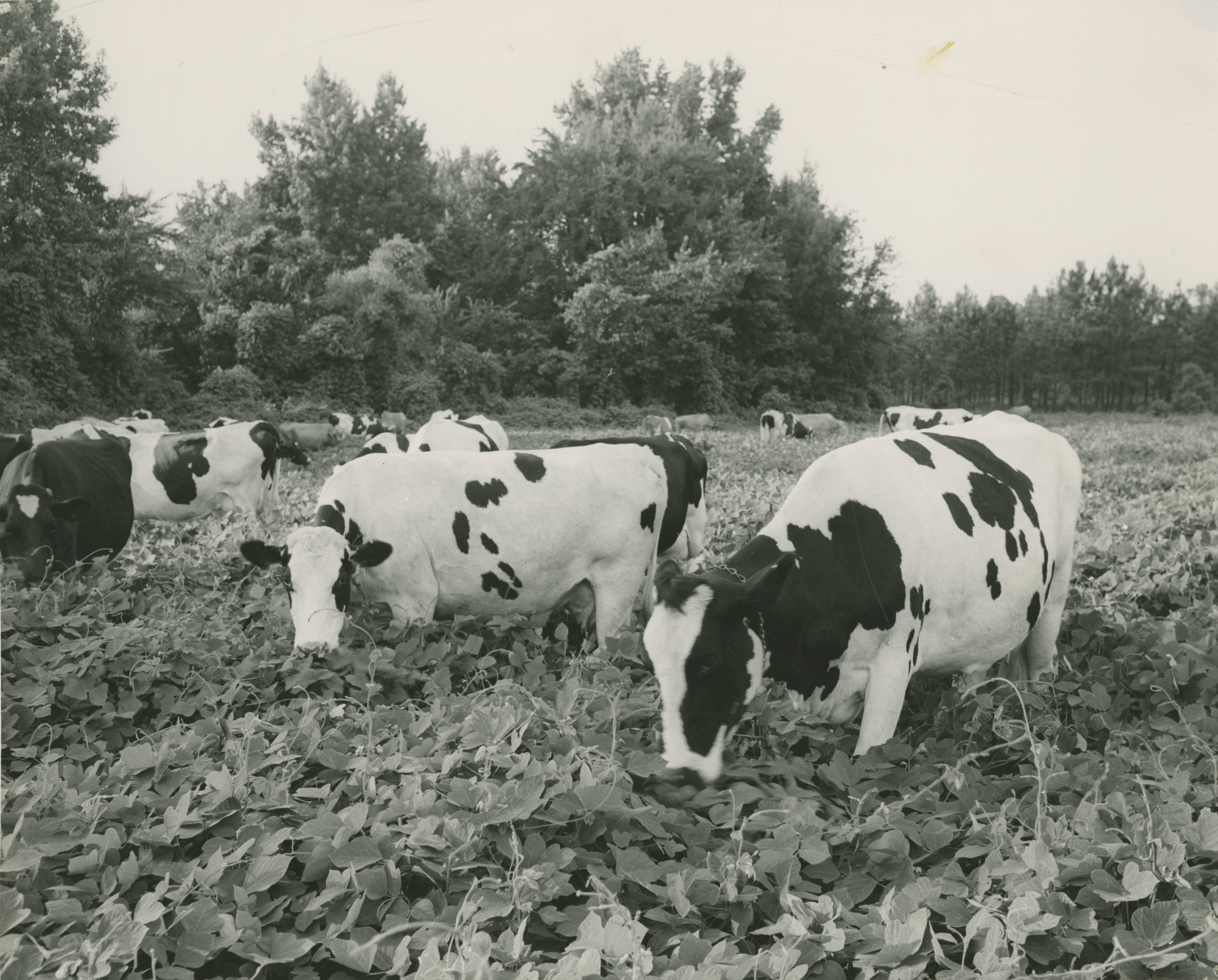
Dairy cows grazing on kudzu. Columbia County, Georgia. 1952/1957?

=== History of US introduction ===
The kudzu plant was introduced to the United States from Japan in 1876 at the Centennial Exposition in Philadelphia. Kudzu was introduced to the Southeast in 1883 at the New Orleans Exposition. The vine was widely marketed in the Southeast as an ornamental plant to be used to shade porches, and in the first half of the 20th century, kudzu was distributed as a high-protein content cattle fodder and as a cover plant to prevent soil erosion. It was cultivated by Civilian Conservation Corps workers as a solution for the erosion during the Dust Bowl. The Soil Erosion Service recommended the use of kudzu to help control erosion of slopes which led to the government-aided distribution of 85 million seedlings and government-funded plantings of kudzu which paid $19.75 per hectare ($7.99/acre). By 1946, it was estimated that 1,200,000 hectares (3,000,000 acres) of kudzu had been planted. When boll weevil infestations and the failure of cotton crops caused farmers to abandon their farms, kudzu plantings were left unattended. The climate and environment of the Southeastern United States allowed the kudzu to grow virtually unchecked. In 1953 the United States Department of Agriculture removed kudzu from a list of suggested cover plants and listed it as a weed in 1970. By 1997, the vine was placed on the "Federal Noxious Weed List." Kudzu was removed from the list of Federal Noxious Weeds in 2000 with the repeal of sections 2801 through 2813 of the Federal Noxious Weed Act of 1974, which were superseded by updated legislation; however it is still listed as a noxious weed in various states. Today, kudzu is estimated to cover 3,000,000 hectares (7,400,000 acres) of land in the southeastern United States, mostly in Alabama, Georgia, Tennessee, Florida, North Carolina, South Carolina, Eastern Kentucky and Mississippi. It has been recorded in Nova Scotia, Canada, in Columbus, Ohio, and in all five boroughs of New York City.

=== Uses and cultivation ===
In the United States, kudzu has been used as livestock feed, in fertilizer, and in erosion control, and the vines have been used for folk art. In Korea, kudzu root is harvested for its starch, which is used in various foods including naengmyon, as well as a health food and herbal medicine. In China, kudzu root is used in herbal remedies, teas, and the treatment of alcohol-related problems. The efficacy of the treatment of alcohol-related problems is currently under question, but experiments show promising results. In Japan, the kudzu root starch (or kuzu root starch) extracted from kudzu roots is used in cooking and natural medicines, and it is used to make hay that sick animals will eat. The starch is used in Japanese cuisine, and is widely consumed as such in that country. Kudzu is also used as a food crop in Java, Sumatra, and Malaya, and can be found in Puerto Rico and South America.

Other uses may include: paper products, food products, insect repellents (the smoke from burning leaves), honey, and methane production.

Kudzu also has potential as a source for biofuel.

== Ecology in and effect on new communities ==
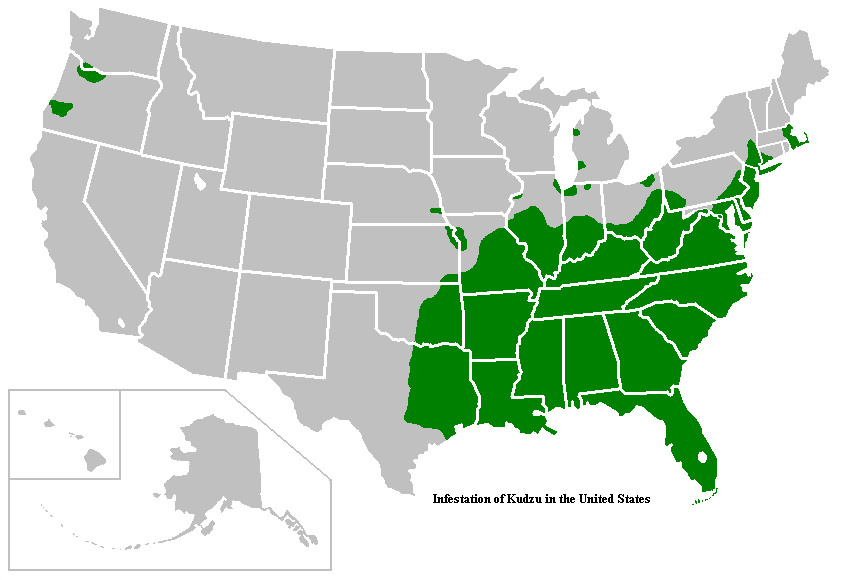
Distribution of Kudzu in the United States

=== New communities ===
Kudzu was intentionally introduced to North America by the Soil Erosion Service and Civilian Conservation Corps in the 1930s for the purpose of controlling soil erosion in the American Southeast. When kudzu was first introduced in the southeast, it was initially used as an ornamental vine to shade homes. By the early 20th century, southerners began to use kudzu for purposes other than ornamentation and so kudzu began to come closer in contact with the land which, in turn, encouraged its spread throughout the southeast. In the 135 years since its introduction, kudzu has spread over three million hectares (ha) of the southern United States, and continues to "consume" the south at an estimated rate of 50,000 hectares (120,000 acres) per year, destroying power lines, buildings, and native vegetation, according to a 2006 study. This claim, however, was disputed in 2015 with the United States Forest Service estimating an increase of 2,500 acres (1,000 ha; 10 km^{2}) per year. In the United States, kudzu is extensively reported in Alabama, Arkansas, Washington, D.C., Delaware, Florida, Georgia, Illinois, Indiana, Kentucky, Louisiana, Maryland, Missouri, Mississippi, North Carolina, North Dakota, New Jersey, Oregon, Ohio, Pennsylvania, South Carolina, Tennessee, Texas, Virginia, and West Virginia. Of these states, three in the southeast have the heaviest infestations: Georgia, Alabama, and Mississippi.

=== Ecological relationships ===
Kudzu kills or damages other plants by smothering them under a blanket of leaves, encompassing tree trunks, breaking branches, or even uprooting entire trees. Kudzu's ability to grow quickly, survive in areas of low nitrogen availability, and acquire resources quickly allows it to out-compete native species. Of the plants that can successfully compete with kudzu, many are other invasive species such as the Chinese privet and the Japanese honeysuckle. In the southeast, the spread of kudzu is especially troublesome because of the high level of biodiversity in this region that is not found in other regions of the United States. Kudzu and other invasive weeds pose a significant threat to the biodiversity in the southeast. They reduce the environment to impoverished "vine barrens." The fast growth and high competitive ability is achieved through several key features of kudzu that are detailed below.

Kudzu is a very stress-tolerant plant. Kudzu is drought tolerant and only the above ground portions of the plant are damaged by frost. Kudzu also forms symbiotic relationships with nitrogen-fixing bacteria to convert atmospheric nitrogen (N_{2}) into ammonium which can be used by surrounding plants. Now the dominant nitrogen-fixing plant in the eastern United States, kudzu fixes an estimated 235 kilograms per hectare (209 11/16 lb/acre) of nitrogen per year, which is an order of magnitude higher than the rates of native species. This ability allows it to flourish in nitrogen-poor sites where other plants are unable to grow. In the absence of other plants, nitrogen then builds up in the soil, allowing the maintenance of large leaf areas and high photosynthetic rates.

While little research has been conducted on the impacts of plant invasion on atmospheric conditions, a study conducted at Stony Brook University in New York shows that kudzu has increased the concentration of atmospheric NOx in the eastern United States, which causes a 2 ppb increase in ground level ozone during high temperature events in addition to soil acidification, aluminum mobilization, and leaching of nitrate (NO_{3}^{−}) into aquatic ecosystems.

Once established in a habitat, kudzu is able to grow very quickly. The vine has a growth rate of 0.3 m (1 foot) every day. The maximum length the vine can reach is 30 m (98 feet). Kudzu is also able to allocate large portions of carbon to root growth, allowing it to acquire sufficient nutrients for rapid growth and to spread clonally. Primary kudzu roots can weigh over 180 kilograms (400 lb), grow to 18 centimetres (7 in) in diameter, and penetrate soil at a rate of 3 centimetres (1 1/8 in) in depth per day. Kudzu can also root wherever stems make contact with soil, allowing vines to grow in all directions. Once rooted, most stems lose connection with each other within one year, allowing each stem to become a physiologically independent individual, and requiring that all stems be treated or removed in order to eliminate a population.

In addition to its abilities to obtain nutrients and spread quickly, kudzu leaves have paraheliotropic movements, meaning that they move in response to the movement of the sun to maximize photosynthetic productivity. Kudzu is also a "structural parasite," meaning that, rather than supporting itself, it grows on top of other plants and buildings to reach light. Its ability to reproduce and spread quickly allows it to quickly cover shrubs, trees, and forests, where it blocks the sun's rays from the plants below it, decreasing or eliminating their photosynthetic productivity.

=== Economic and cultural impact ===
The economic impact of kudzu in the United States is estimated at $100 million to $500 million lost per year in forest productivity. In addition, it takes about $5,000 per hectare ($2,000/acre) per year to control kudzu. Power companies must spend about $1.5 million per year to repair damage to power lines. Even so, occasional downed lines continue throughout the south.

Kudzu management is of great concern in the management of national parks in the southeast such as Vicksburg National Military Park, Chickamauga and Chattanooga National Military Park, and Great Smoky Mountains National Park. In Vicksburg, kudzu has invaded 190 acres (77 ha) of the 2,000 total acres (810 ha) of the park and threatens to diminish the historical value of the park.

== Control and removal methods ==
There are several methods for controlling kudzu growth that are used in the Southeastern United States. These include mechanical, chemical, and biological methods. Control of the vine is difficult because kudzu propagates through runners, rhizomes, nodes on vines, and seeds. Leftover root fragments from lawnmowers can also take root and become established.

=== Mechanical ===
Most mechanical means of kudzu removal practiced in the southeastern United States involve mowing the vine or cutting it back. These methods, though more effective than herbicides, are more time-consuming. Vines must be mowed down just above ground level every month or two during the growing season in order to prevent them from growing back. When using this method of kudzu control, all of the plant material must be removed and/or destroyed (burned or fed to cattle) to prevent the vines from taking root and re-growing. Another method of mechanical removal is to remove the crown of the plant. This part must also be destroyed to prevent re-implantation.

=== Chemical ===
A different and less time-consuming option for the control of kudzu is treatment with herbicides. Some common herbicides used are picloram and triclopyr; the most effective are picloram and tebuthiuron. However, chemical treatments are expensive, and killing off the plant completely requires large amounts of herbicides (40–80 US gallons per acre (370–750 L/ha)). Herbicides are found to be most effective when they are used during the typical growing season, June–October, and when used for successive years. One case study saw a significant decrease in the growth of kudzu after just two years, whereas another study required the use of the herbicide for up to ten years.

Another form of chemical removal other than herbicides is soil solarization. Soil solarization is a thermal (heat) method that utilizes solar-enhanced heating of the soil to kill the root system of the plant, thereby avoiding the use of pesticides and other more dangerous (fire-based) means to control the plant. Soil solarization affects the micronutrients and macronutrients in the soil. The most prominent effect of this method of control is the increase in potassium. The higher level of potassium in all soils undergoing solarization demonstrates the successful release of potassium from decomposing kudzu plant tissues. Such a rise in potassium levels by solarization is important for soils in the Southeastern United States that tend to be highly weathered and generally have low potassium contents.

=== Biological ===
As chemical treatments are often ineffective for long term control and mechanical removal is likewise difficult and costly for long-term control, kudzu makes a good candidate for biological pest control. There are several biological means that are already in place and more that may be implemented to control the growth of kudzu. Bacterial blights, insect herbivory, and insect seed predation occur in high levels in field populations of kudzu. Seed predation is quite prevalent, with up to 81% of seeds incurring damage in populations studied in North Carolina. A different survey found twenty-five different species of insect feeding on the kudzu. From this survey, several leaf-feeding beetles and sawflies that have no other known hosts were identified. A separate study also found two weevils that attacked the stems of kudzu and eight beetles that complete larval development in the kudzu roots. When evaluations of potential control agents are made, the range of the control agents must be taken into account. Organisms that feed on kudzu will often feed on related non-target species that are important in agriculture, such as soybeans and hog-peanuts. Potential control agents have to be rejected if they are shown in laboratory and field tests to feed on these non-target plants.

==== Diseases ====
Of the diseases that have been identified as potential biological control agents, the fungal pathogen Myrothecium verrucaria has been shown to be very promising. Disease development is very high at around 30–40 °C (86–104 °F), which matches field conditions. In addition, the fungus does not spread outside of areas where it is applied. However, one major drawback of this biological control agent is that it is highly toxic to mammals, so extreme care would have to be taken in handling this organism. Other pathogens have been tested as potential biological control agents, but have proven to be ineffective.

==== Livestock ====
An early method of control for kudzu included grazing by cattle and other livestock because the vine has excellent nutritional value and is very palatable for a variety of livestock. The grazing area where kudzu is to be controlled must be fenced to prevent the livestock from roaming, thereby resulting in a limitation for this method. The livestock must also rotate through different grazing areas as the kudzu is grazed down, and only through repeated grazing of the regrowth will the root reserves of starch begin to deplete. Currently, grazing by goats and pigs is the best method for control of the vine. In Tennessee, a vegetation clearing company that uses goats to control kudzu reported that about 200 goats are needed to consume one acre of vegetation per day.

== See also ==
- Environmental issues in the United States
- Invasive species in the United States
