= Kudzu powder =

East-Asian cuisine ingredient

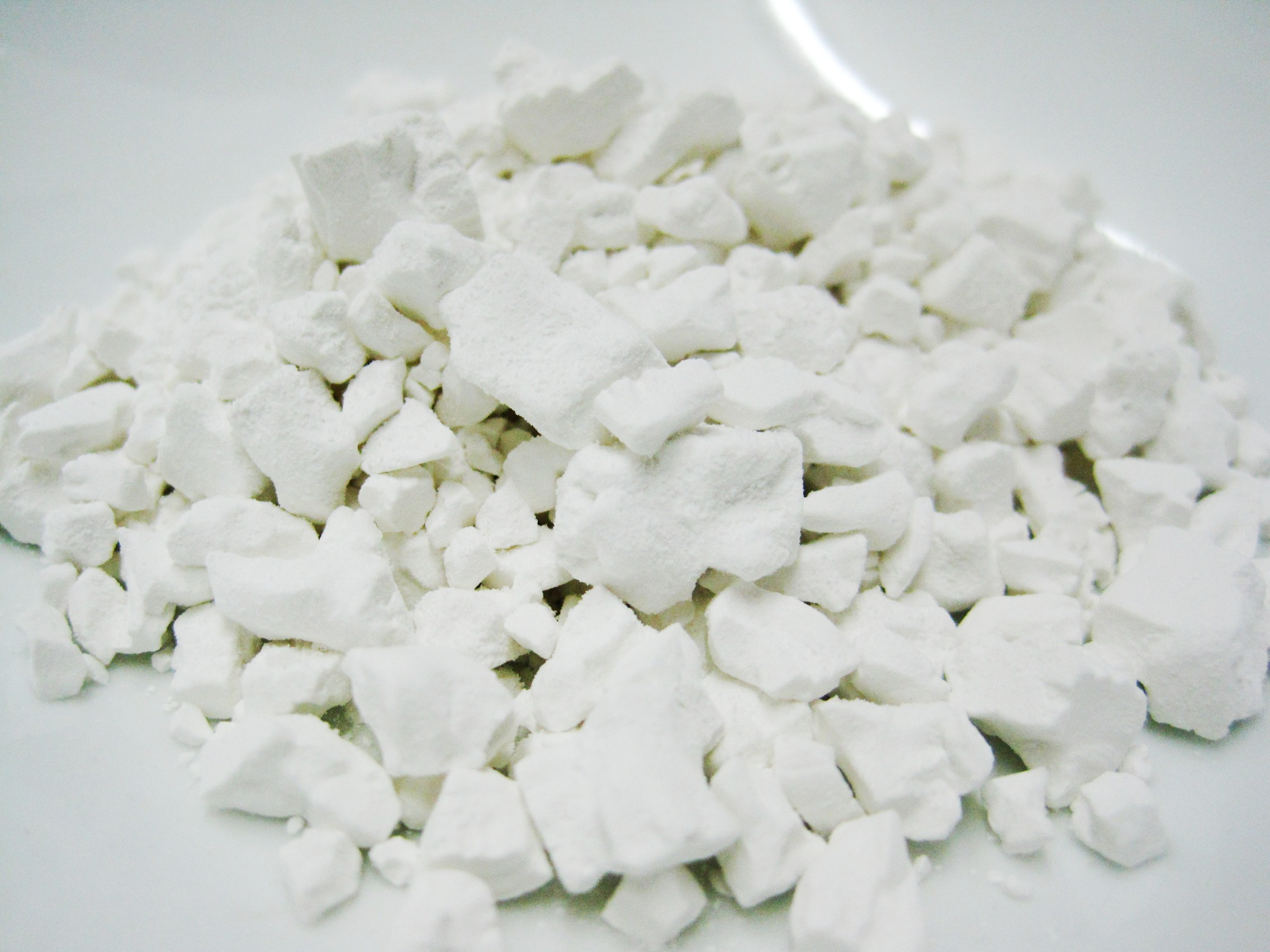
- Kudzu powder in blocks
- Alternative names: Géfěn, kuzuko, chik-garu, galbun, bột sắn dây
- Place of origin: China, Korea, Japan
- Region or state: East Asia
- Main ingredients: Kudzu starch

Kudzu powder, called géfěn (葛粉) in Chinese, kuzuko (葛粉; くずこ) in Japanese, chik-garu (칡가루) or galbun (Korean: 갈분; Hanja: 葛粉) in Korean, and bột sắn dây in Vietnamese is a starch powder made from the root of the kudzu plant. It is used in traditional East Asian cuisine mainly for thickening sauces and making various types of desserts.

== Dishes ==
Examples of dishes that use kuzuko:

- Ankake (liquid stock thickened with kuzuko)
- Goma-dofu (kuzuko pudding with sesame paste)

Examples of wagashi (Japanese desserts) with kuzuko:

- Kuzumochi cakes
- Kuzukiri (clear cake of boiled kuzuko cut into noodle-like strips and eaten with kuromitsu)
- Kuzuzakura (a.k.a. kuzu-dama, a cake of bean paste covered with kuzuko)
- Mizu manjū (red bean paste is coated with translucent kuzuko paste that is then allowed to set into a jelly-like consistency)

Examples of Tong sui (Chinese desserts usually in soup form)

- Got Fan soup

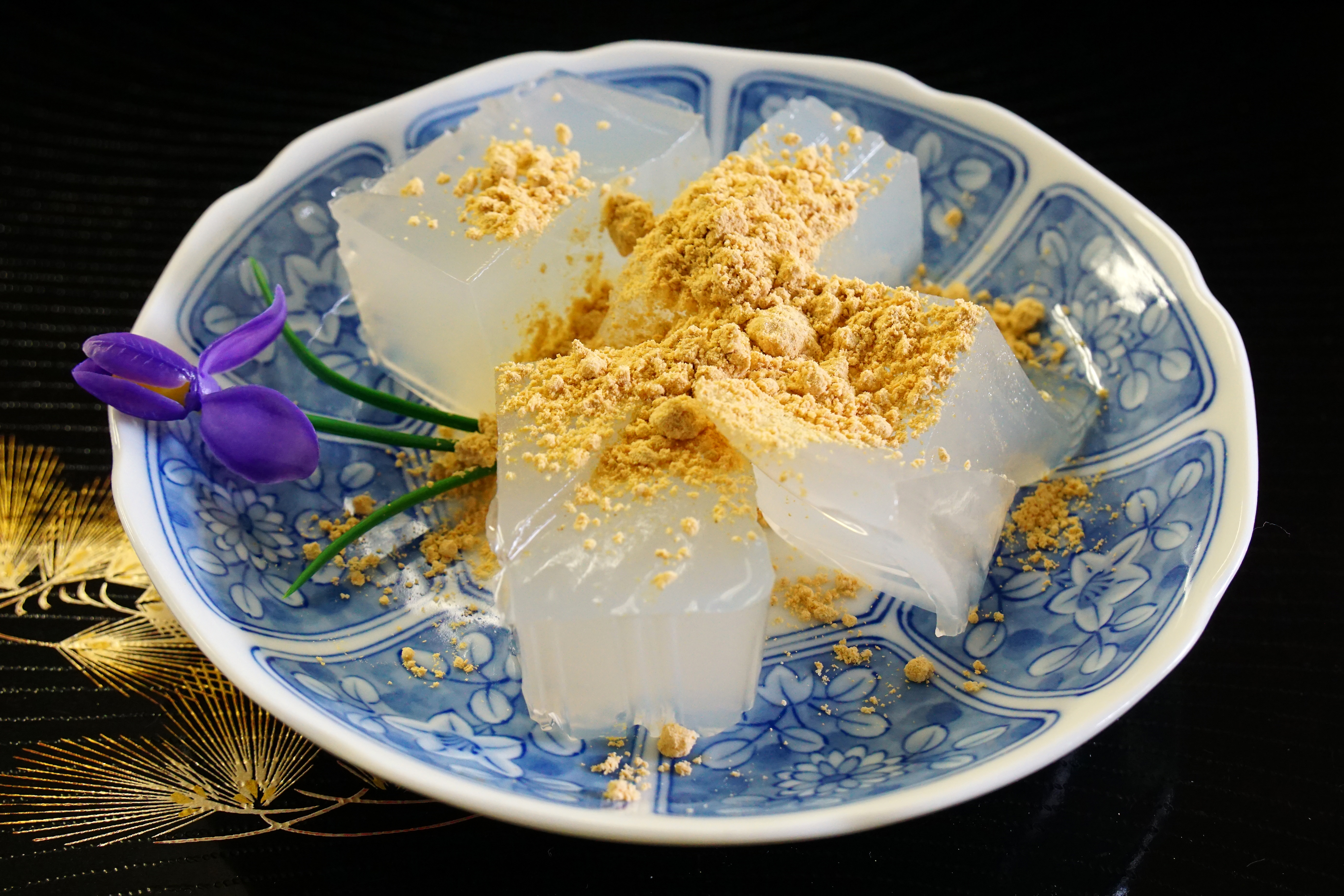
Kuzumochi with kinako powder

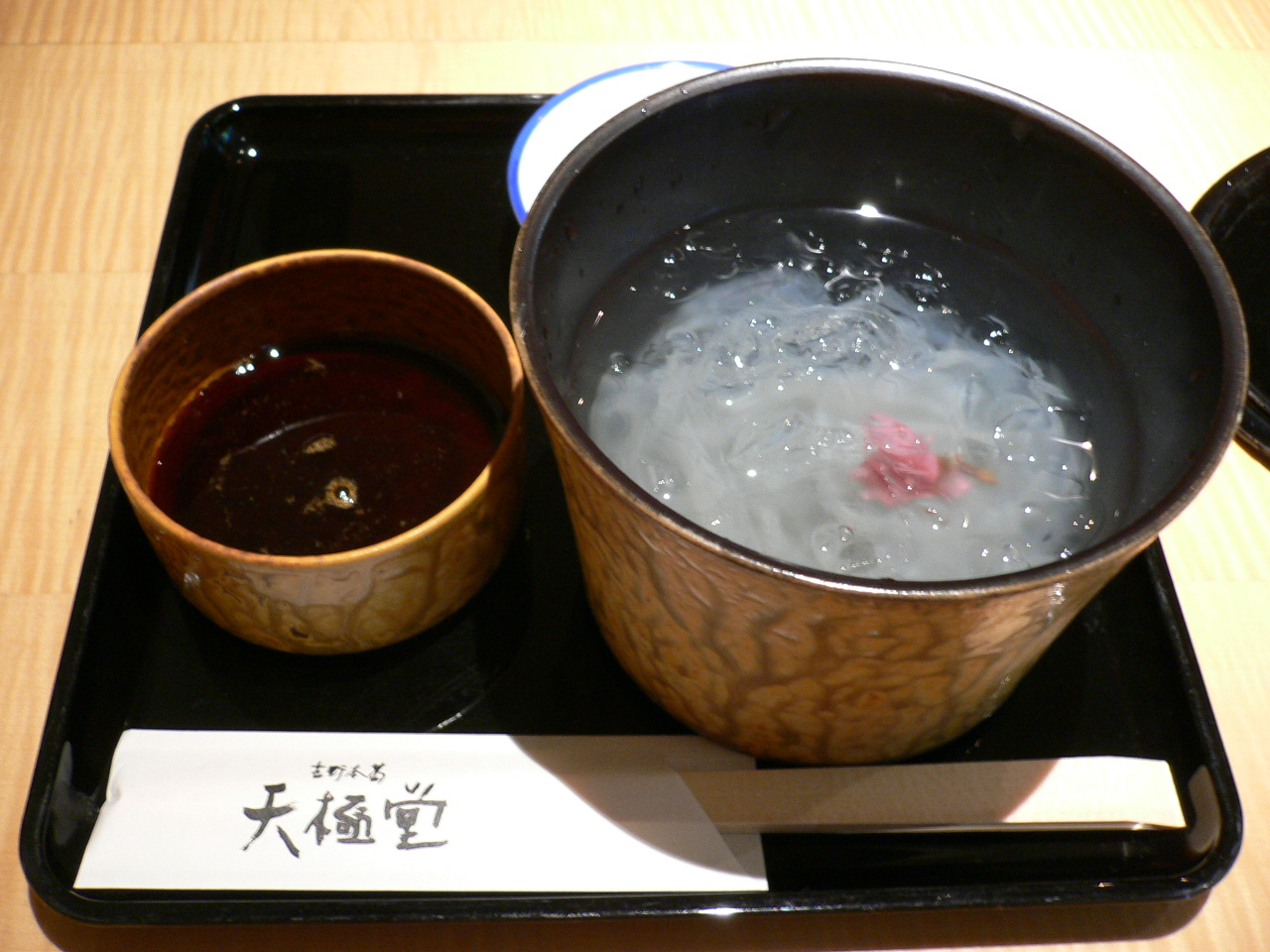
Kuzukiri noodles
