= Warabimochi =

Japanese jelly-like confection

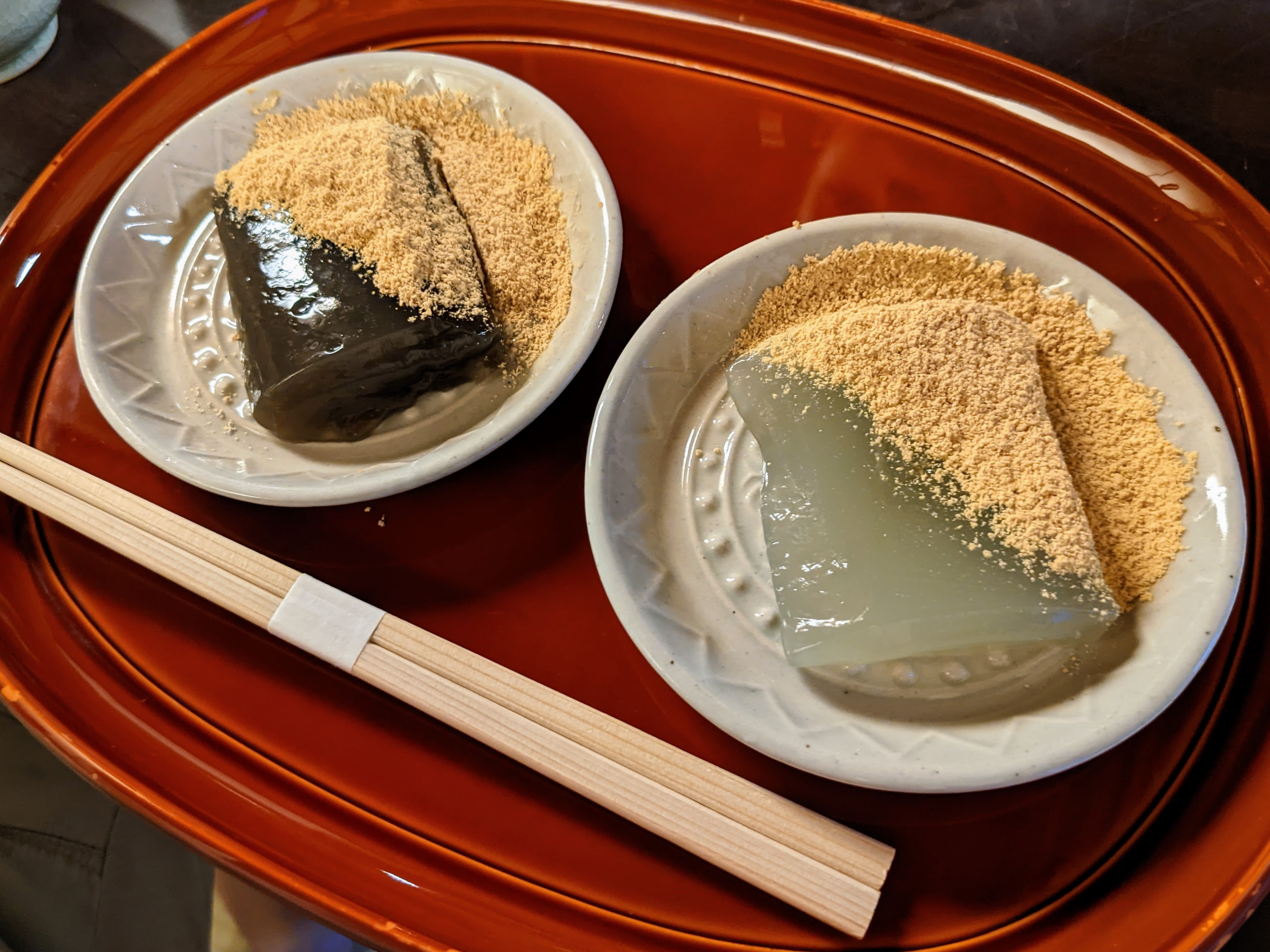
- Darker 100% bracken warabimochi (left) and lighter mixed warabimochi (right), both dusted with kinako soybean flour
- Type: Wagashi
- Course: Snack/dessert
- Place of origin: Japan
- Main ingredients: Bracken starch, kinako
- Variations: Sesame

Warabimochi (蕨餅, warabi-mochi) is a wagashi (Japanese confection) made from warabiko (bracken starch) and covered or dipped in kinako (sweet toasted soybean flour). Kuromitsu syrup is sometimes poured on top before serving as an added sweetener.

Since real bracken starch is rare and expensive, cheaper warabimochi sold in regular stores often uses starches made from sweet potatoes or other sources instead.

== History ==
Warabimochi is a traditional Japanese dessert that is believed to date back to the Heian period (794–1185) in Japan, when it was a popular delicacy among the aristocracy. It was one of the favorite treats of Emperor Daigo.

Hayashi Razan's "Heishin kikō (Travelogue of 1616) [...], which is considered to be the first travel diary to mention food on the road," highlighted warabimochi as did other Tōkaidō travel guides in the 1600s. The dessert became more widespread during the Edo period (1603–1868) when it was served in tea houses as part of the traditional Japanese tea ceremony. It is now popular in the summertime, especially in the Kansai region and Okinawa Prefecture.

== Production ==
Warabimochi is produced by mixing a suitable starch, sugar and water, then heating the mixture to gelatinize it. Commercially prepared warabimochi often adds trehalose to prevent it from becoming hard when refrigerated.

Warabimochi is frequently made with katakuriko (potato starch) instead of bracken starch due to cost and availability. In 2021, Warabi starch sold for JPY 12,000–15,000 (US$116–145)/kg, and it was 30–35 times more expensive than sweet potato or tapioca starch and 20–24 times more expensive than sago starch.

Warabimochi differs from true mochi in that it is not made from glutinous rice. It is called "mochi" for its sticky texture.

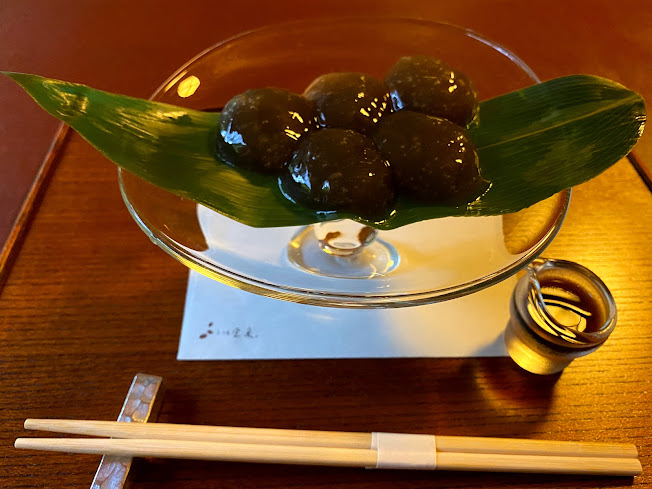

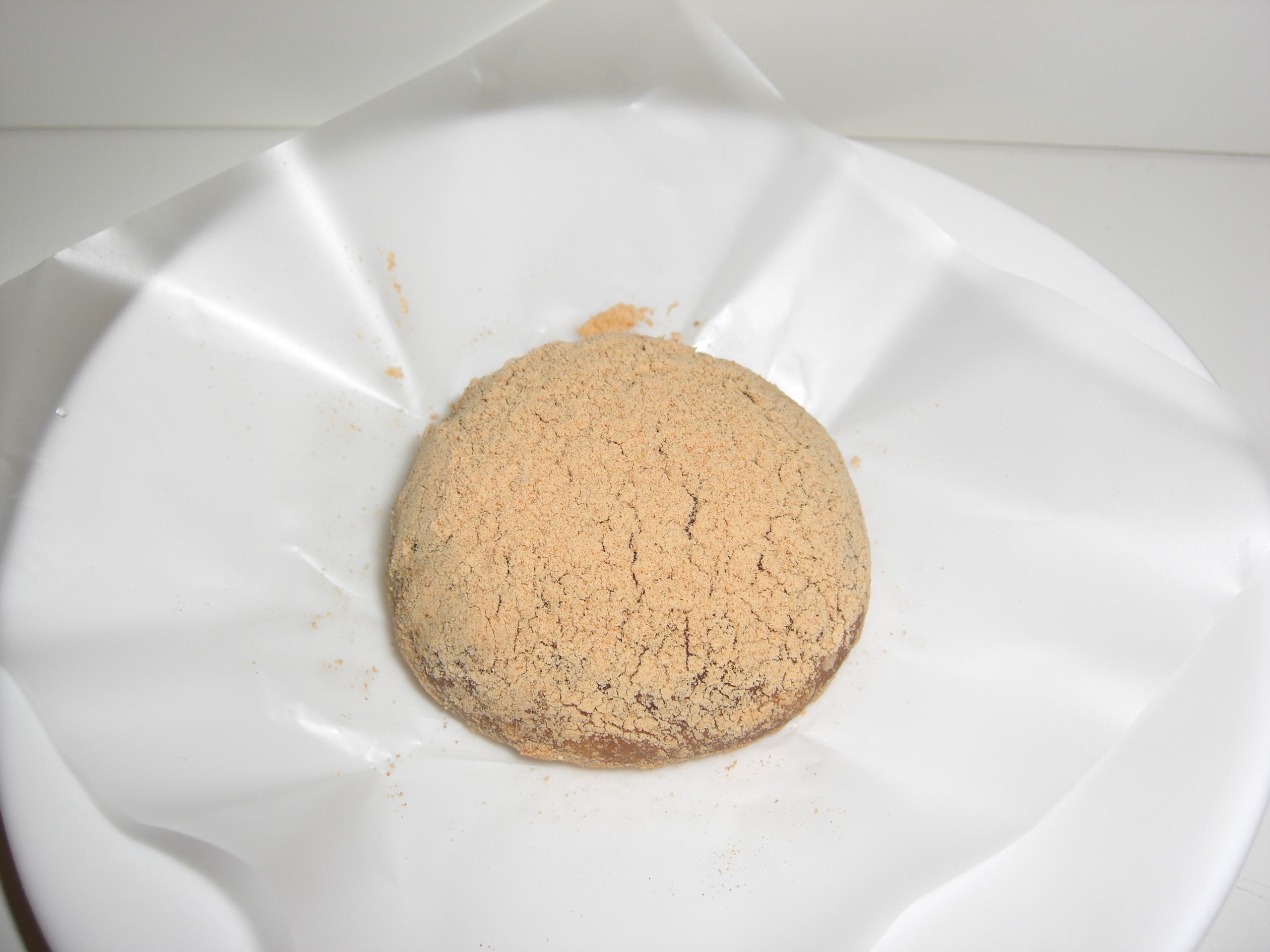
Dusted with kinako powder

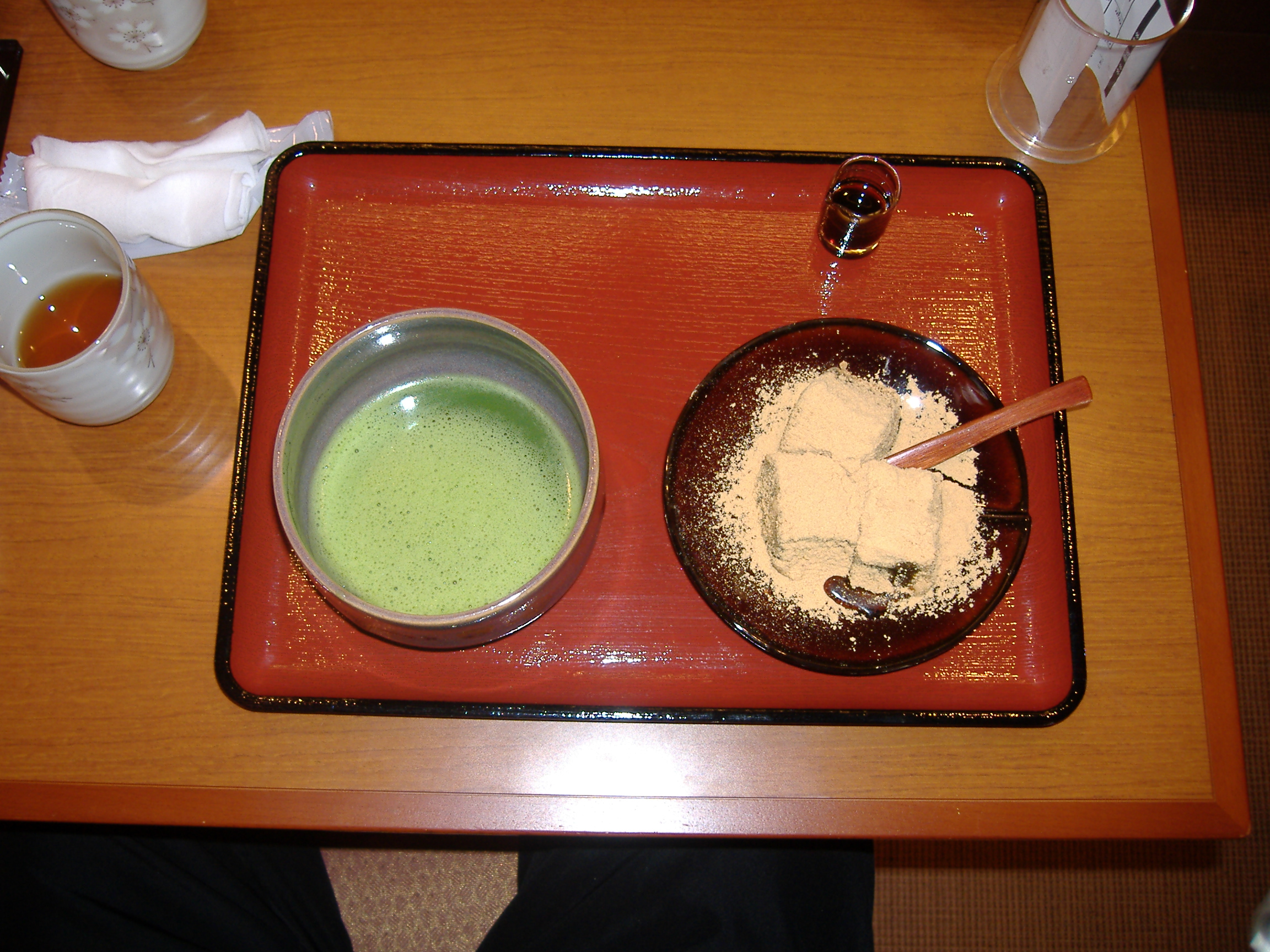
With matcha and kuromitsu

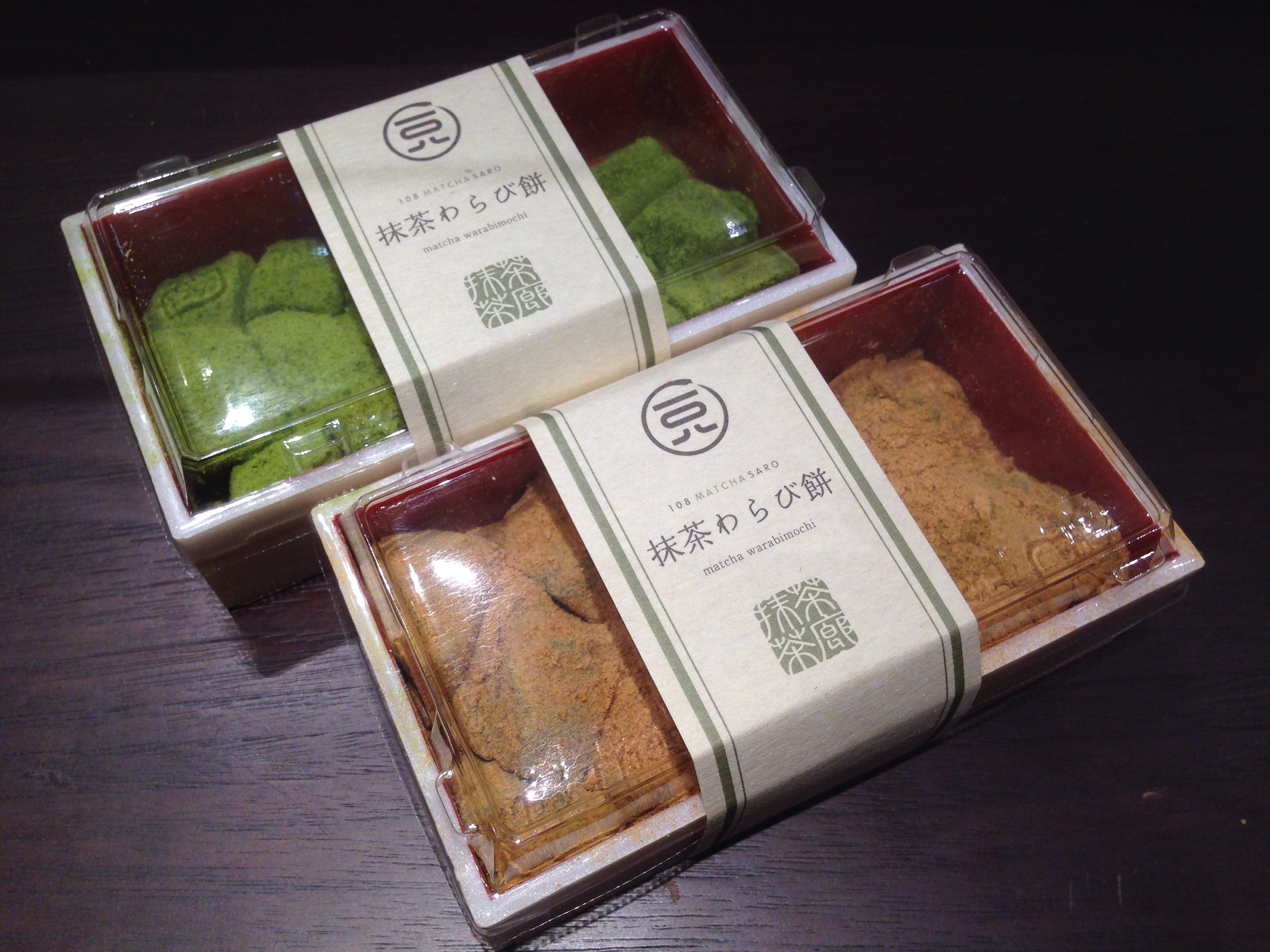
With matcha powder

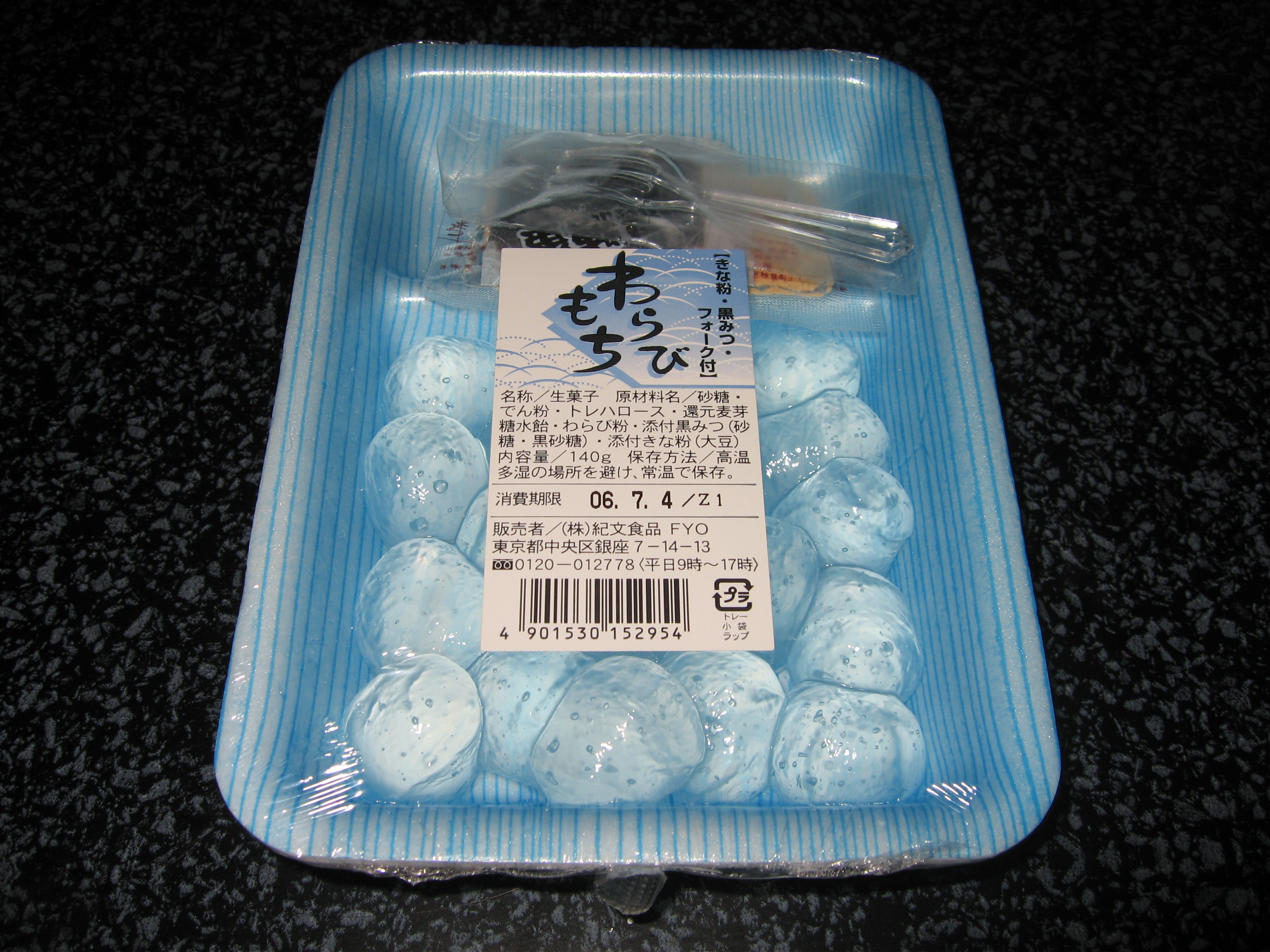
Warabimochi from a supermarket

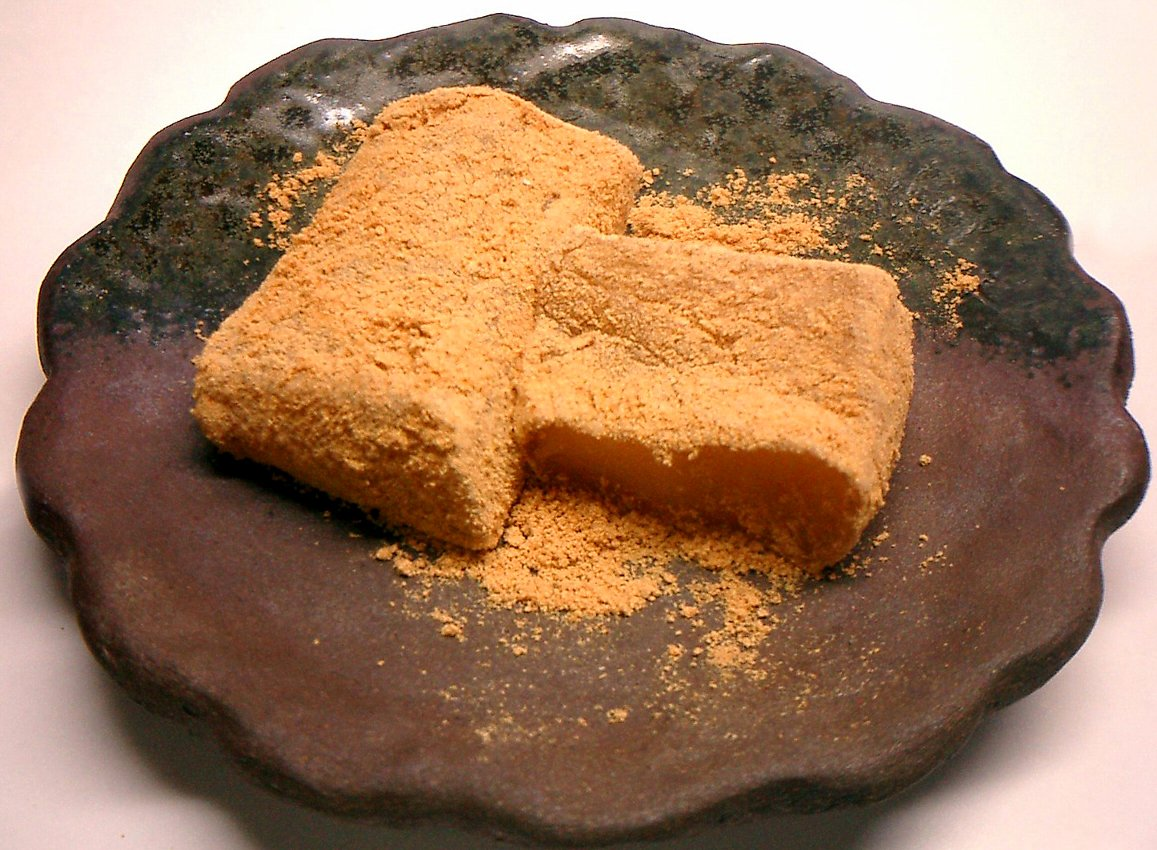
Kurumimochi (warabimochi filled with walnut paste)
