= Nerikuri =

Local cuisine of Kagoshima and Miyazaki prefectures, Japan

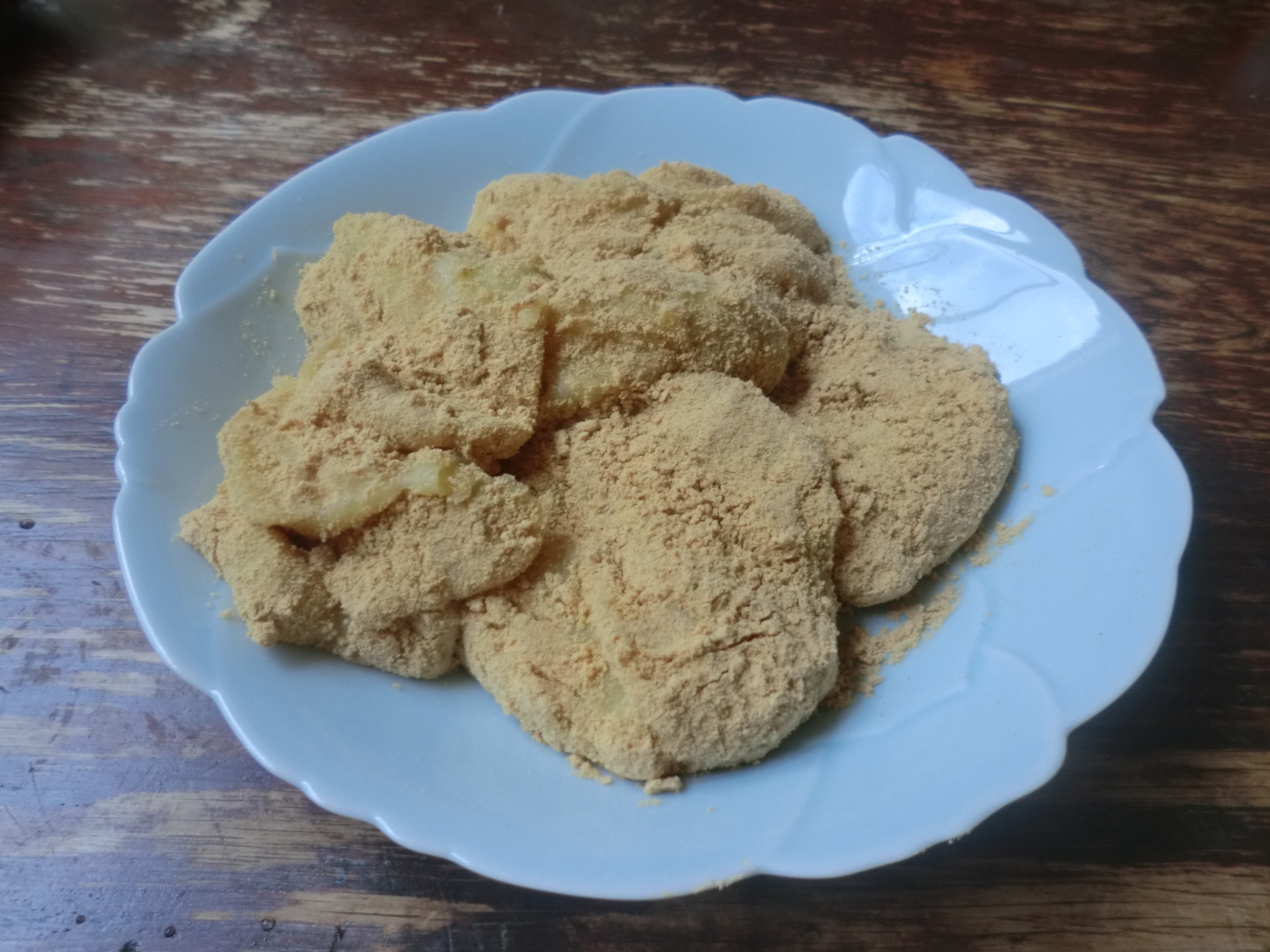
Nerikuri

Nerikuri (ねりくり) is a traditional local dish from Kyushu, particularly in Kagoshima and Miyazaki Prefectures, Japan. It is known by various names depending on the region, including nettabo(ねったぼ), nettaukuri(ねったくり), and karaimo nettabo (からいもねったぼ).

== Overview ==
Nerikuri is believed to have been made since the Edo period and is a type of sweet potato mochi made by combining boiled mochi with steamed satsumaimo (sweet potatoes).

It is often prepared using leftover or hardened mochi from the New Year, or mizumochi, and is typically eaten coated with kinako (roasted soybean flour).

In Miyazaki Prefecture, it is mainly consumed in and around the city of Miyakonojo.

== Manufacturing method ==
To prepare nerikuri, washed and peeled sweet potatoes are roughly chopped and placed in a pot with just enough water to cover them. The sweet potatoes are then boiled until they begin to soften.

Once softened, pieces of mochi are added to the pot. The mixture is boiled further until both the sweet potatoes and mochi become tender.

After boiling, the water is drained, and a small amount of salt is added. The mixture is then mashed and thoroughly combined using a suribachi (Japanese mortar and pestle) until it becomes uniform.

The mixture is then torn into bite-sized pieces and coated with kinako (roasted soybean flour) before being served.

In some versions, sweet red bean paste (anko) is prepared separately and used as a filling inside the mochi.
