= Kuzumochi =

Japanese dish

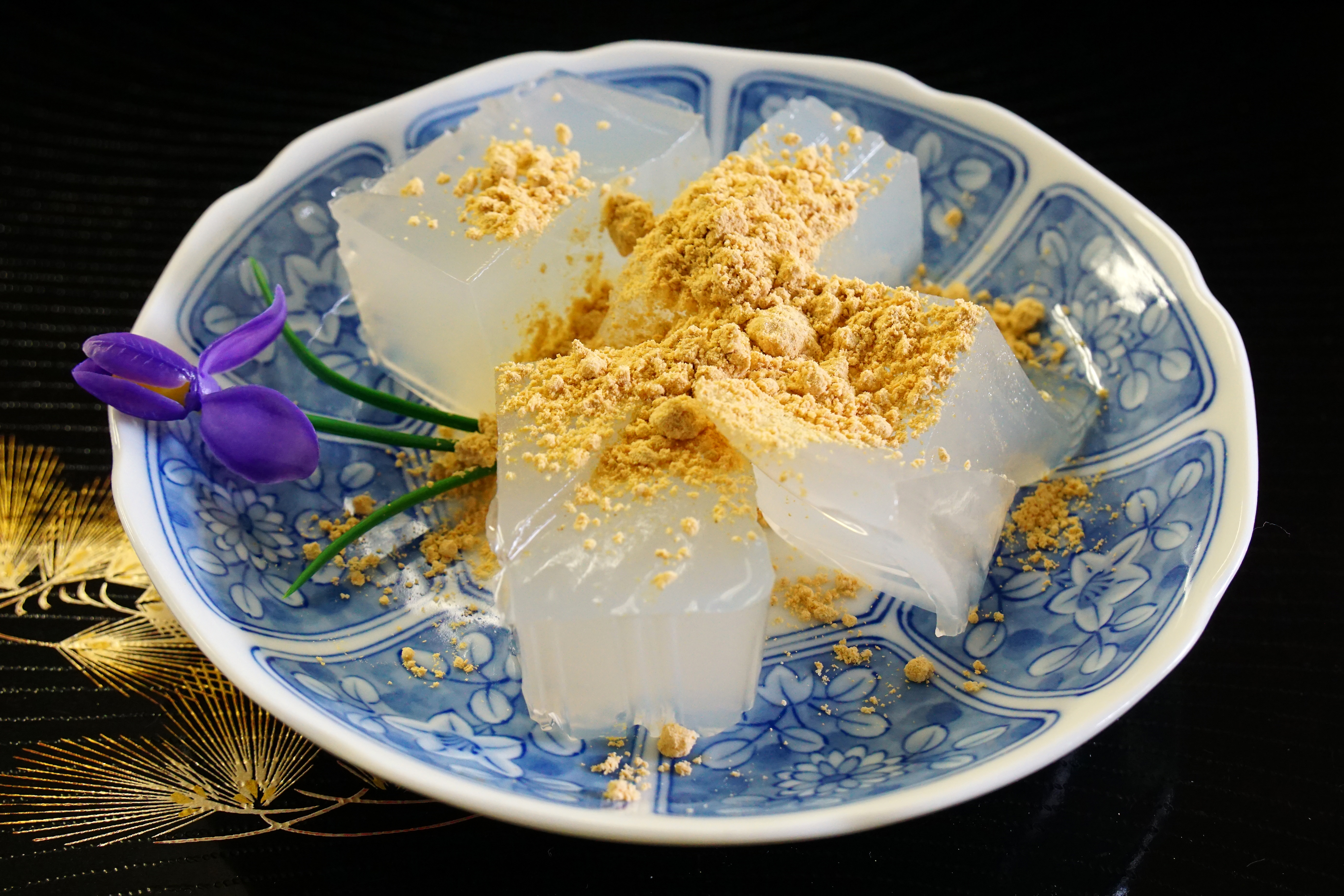
- Kuzumochi with kinako powder
- Type: Cake
- Place of origin: Japan
- Serving temperature: Cold
- Main ingredients: Mochi, kudzu powder

Kuzumochi (葛餅/久寿餅) is a Japanese term referring either to mochi cakes made of kuzuko (葛粉), starch derived from the root of the kudzu plant, or mochi cakes made from Lactobacillales-fermented wheat starch (久寿餅) which is a speciality dish local to certain wards of Tokyo, served chilled and topped with kuromitsu and kinako.

The usual preparation involves combining kudzu powder with water and sugar and cooking it over a gentle heat, stirring continuously until the mixture thickens and becomes transparent. This process also imparts an elastic texture to the kuzu. The transparent appearance of the final product contributes to a cool sensation, making it a popular choice for consumption during warmer months.

== Gallery ==
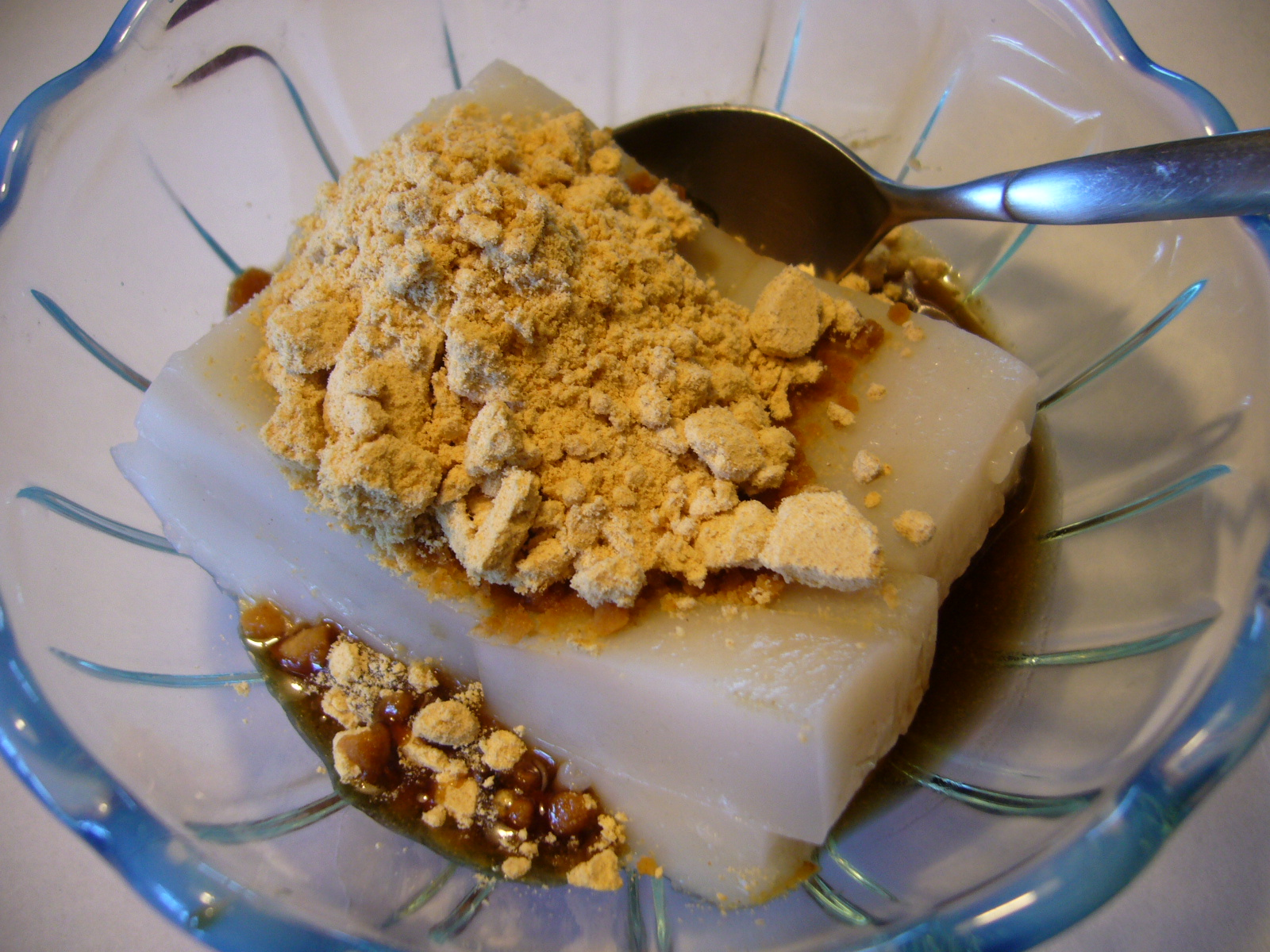
Tokyo-style kuzumochi (久寿餅)

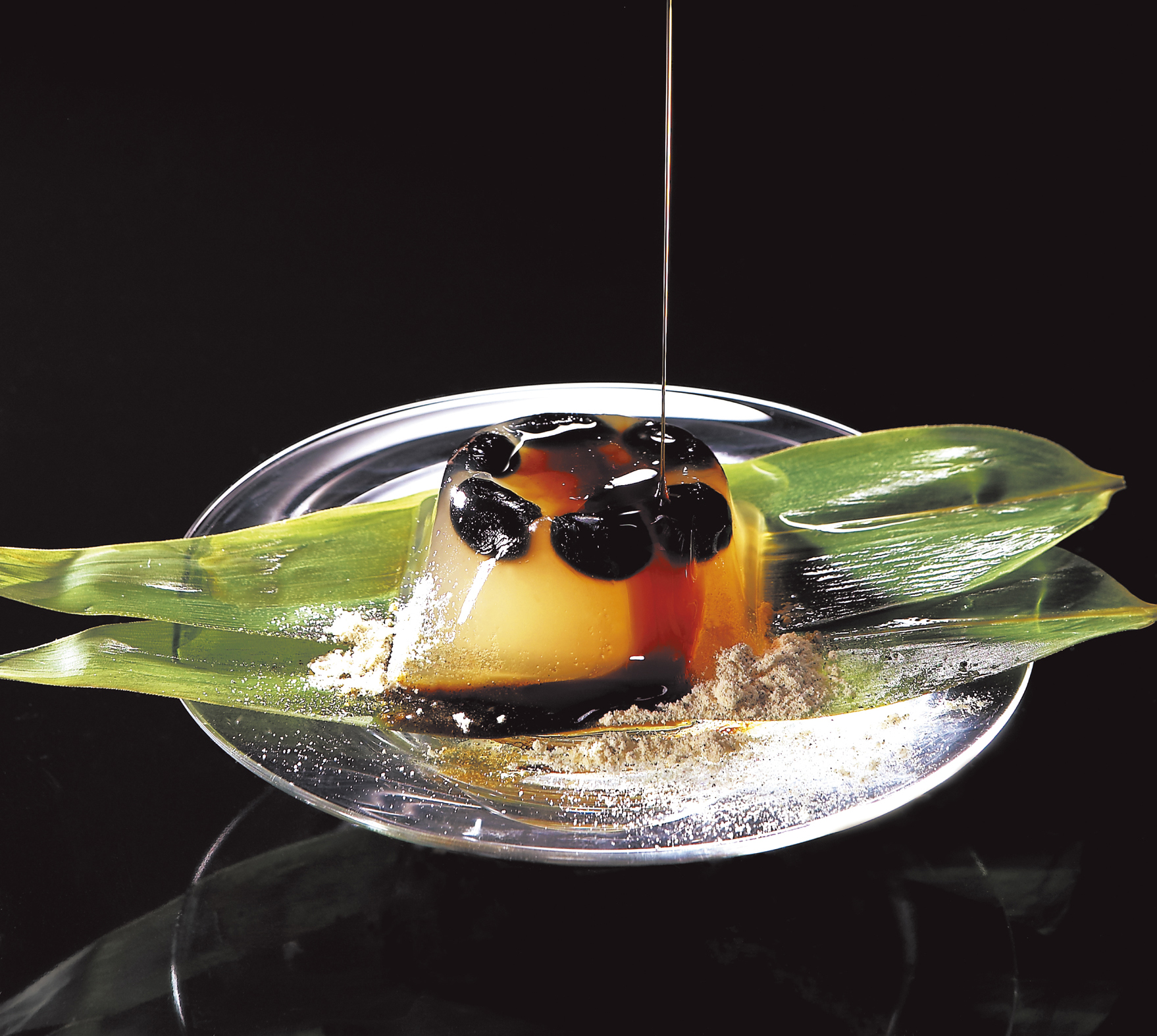

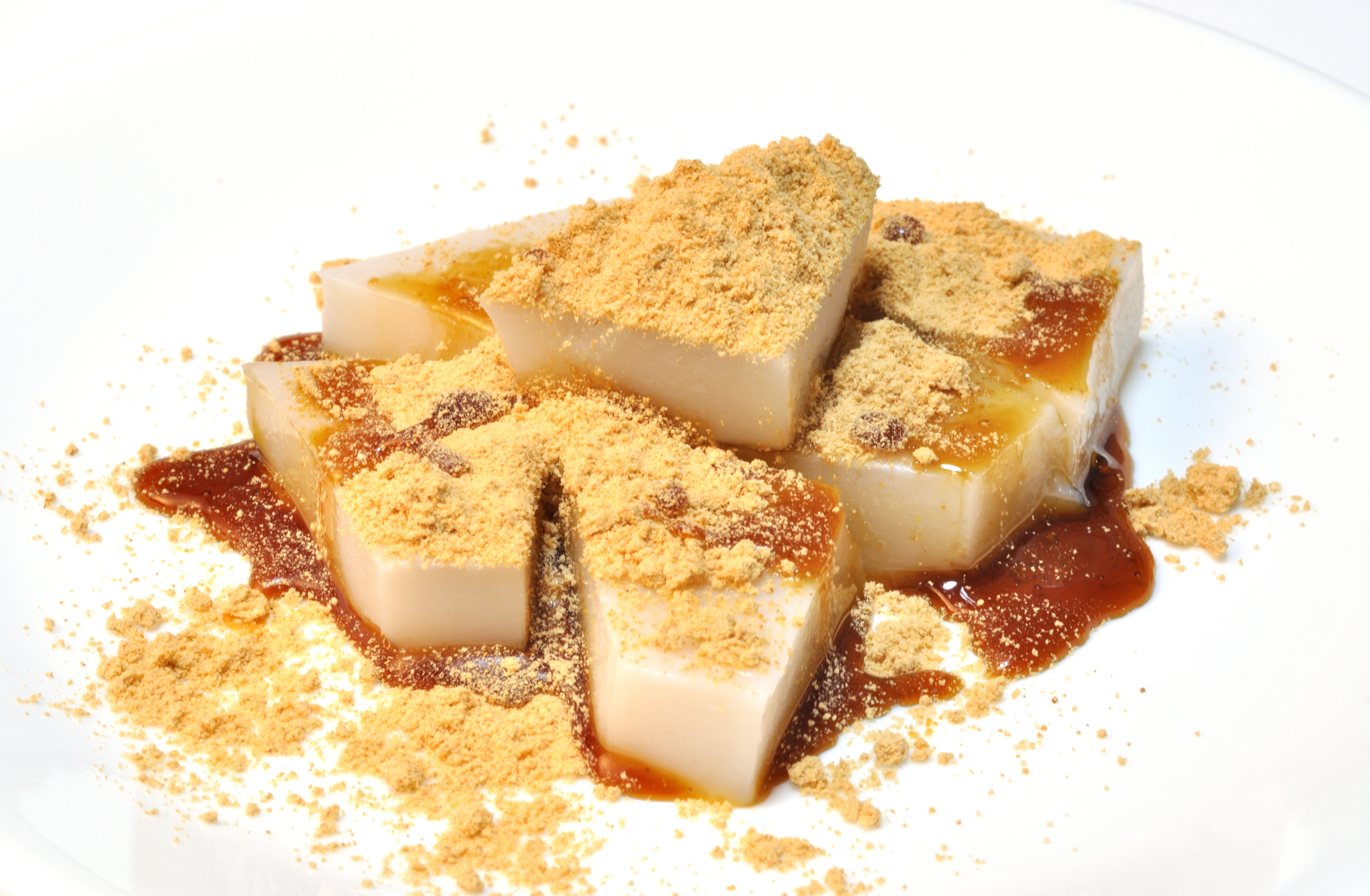

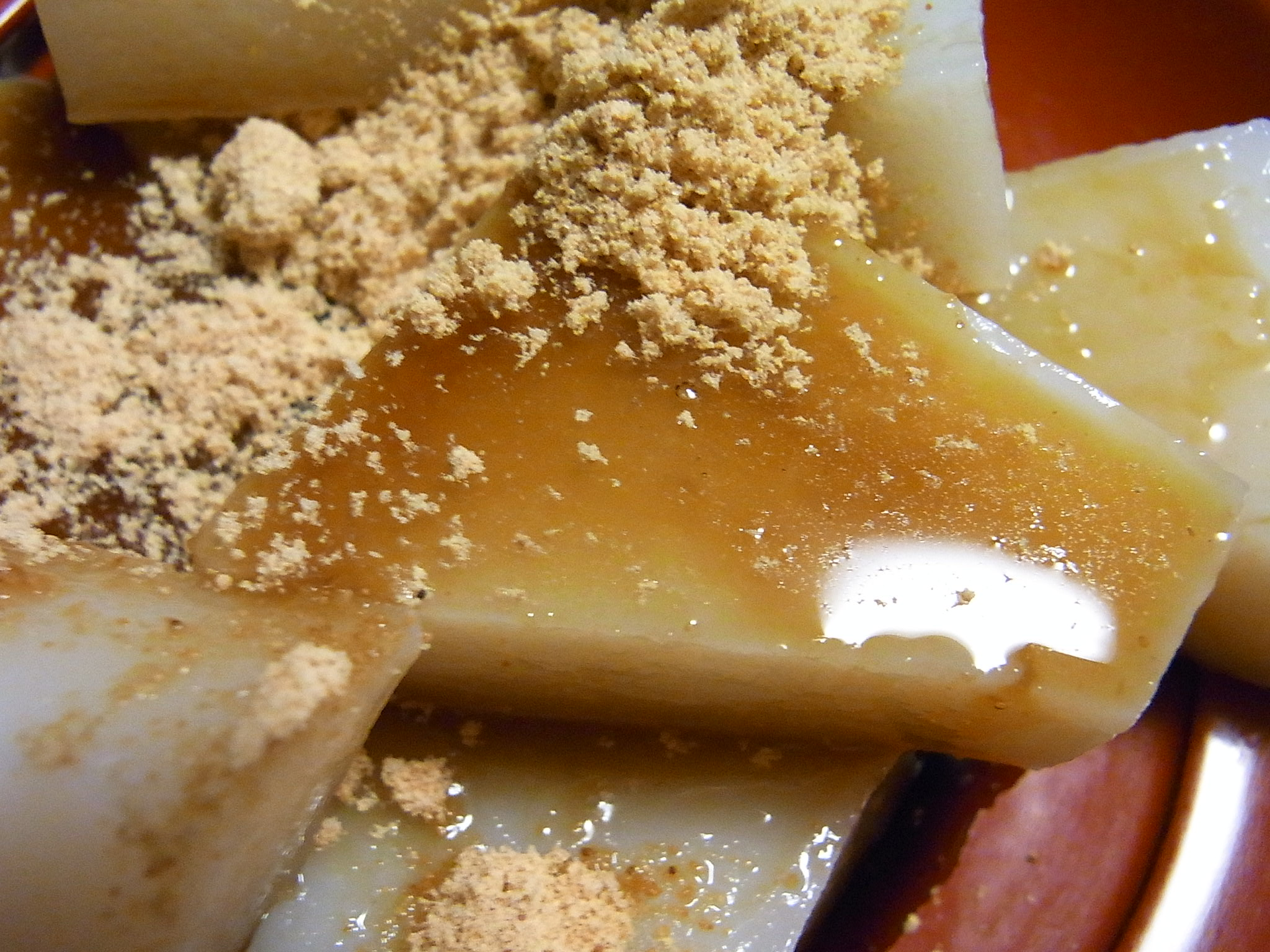

Kuzu mochi (kuzu dumplings) in a glass dish, Obama
