= Kuromitsu =

Japanese sugar syrup

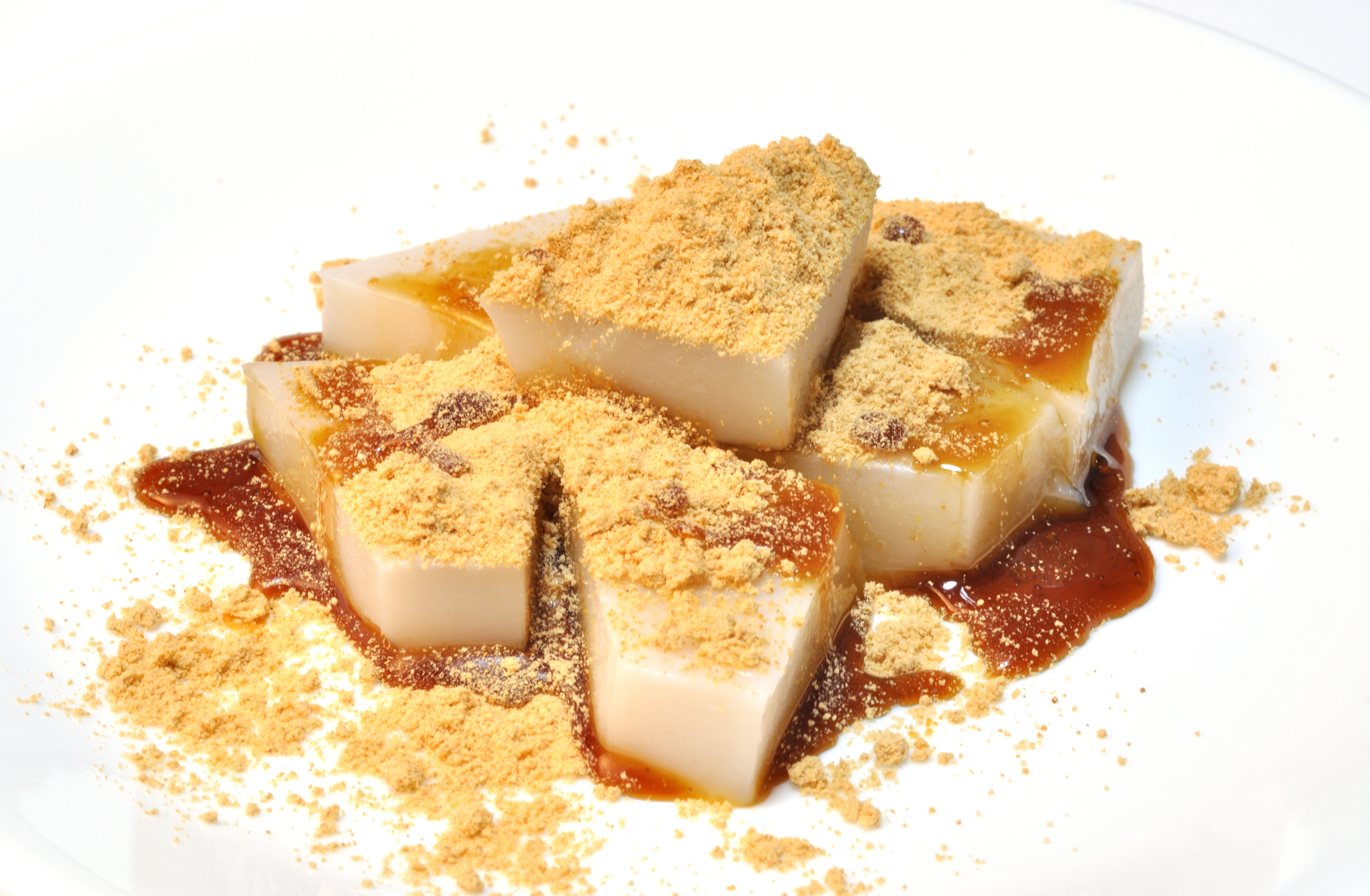
- Kuzumochi with kuromitsu and kinako
- Alternative names: 黒蜜
- Type: Sugar syrup
- Place of origin: Japan
- Main ingredients: Kokutō
- Similar dishes: Molasses

Kuromitsu (黒蜜, literally "black honey") is a Japanese sugar syrup. It is similar to molasses, but thinner and milder.

It is typically made from unrefined kokutō (muscovado sugar), and is a central ingredient in many Japanese sweets. It is one of the ingredients used in making wagashi, and is eaten with kuzumochi, fruit, ice cream, and other confectionery.

== See also ==
- List of syrups

== Sources ==
- Taste of Zen: kuromitsu recipe
