= Kinako =

Roasted soybean flour

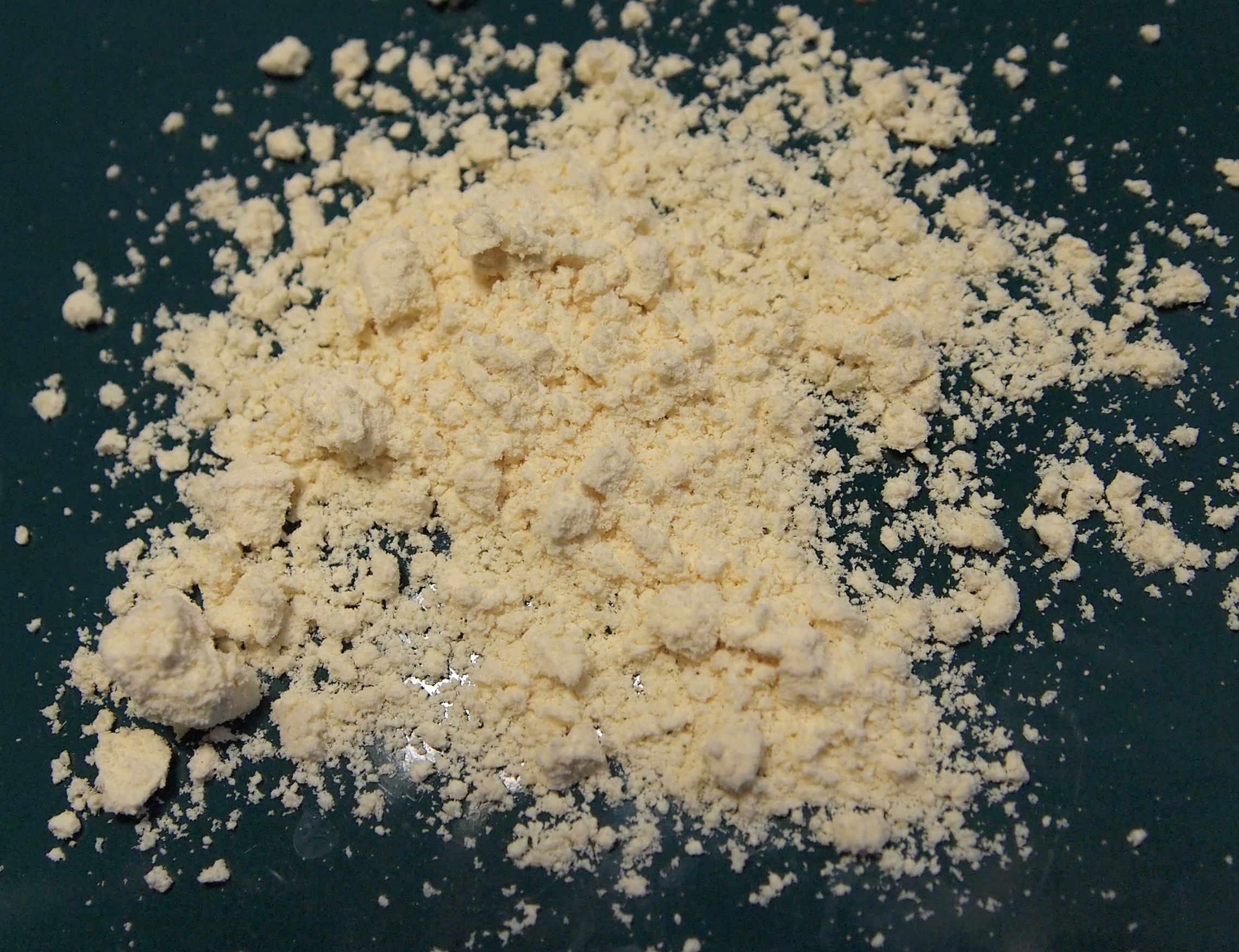
- Kinako, or roasted soybean flour
- Place of origin: Japan
- Main ingredients: Soybeans

Kinako (黄粉 or きなこ "yellow flour") is roasted soybean flour, used in Japanese cuisine. In English, it is usually called "roasted soy flour". Kinako is mostly used as a topping to flavor rice cakes like mochi.

== History ==
Usage of the word kinako appeared in Japanese cookbooks from the late Muromachi period (1336–1573).

An early record of the word comes from the text Sōtan Chakai Kondate Nikki (Sōtan's Tea Ceremony Cookery Menu Diary), written in 1587 by Sen no Sōtan, a tea ceremony master.

== Production ==
Kinako is produced by finely grinding roasted soybeans into powder. The skin of the soybean is typically removed before pulverizing the beans, but some varieties of kinako retain the roasted skin. Yellow soybeans produce a yellow kinako, and green soybeans produce a light-green product.

== Usage ==
Kinako is widely used in Japanese cooking, but is strongly associated with dango and wagashi. Dango, dumplings made from mochiko (rice flour), are commonly coated with kinako. Examples include ohagi and Abekawa-mochi. Kinako, when combined with milk or soy milk, can also be made into a drink. One example of its use in popular foods is warabimochi, which is a famous kinako-covered sweet.

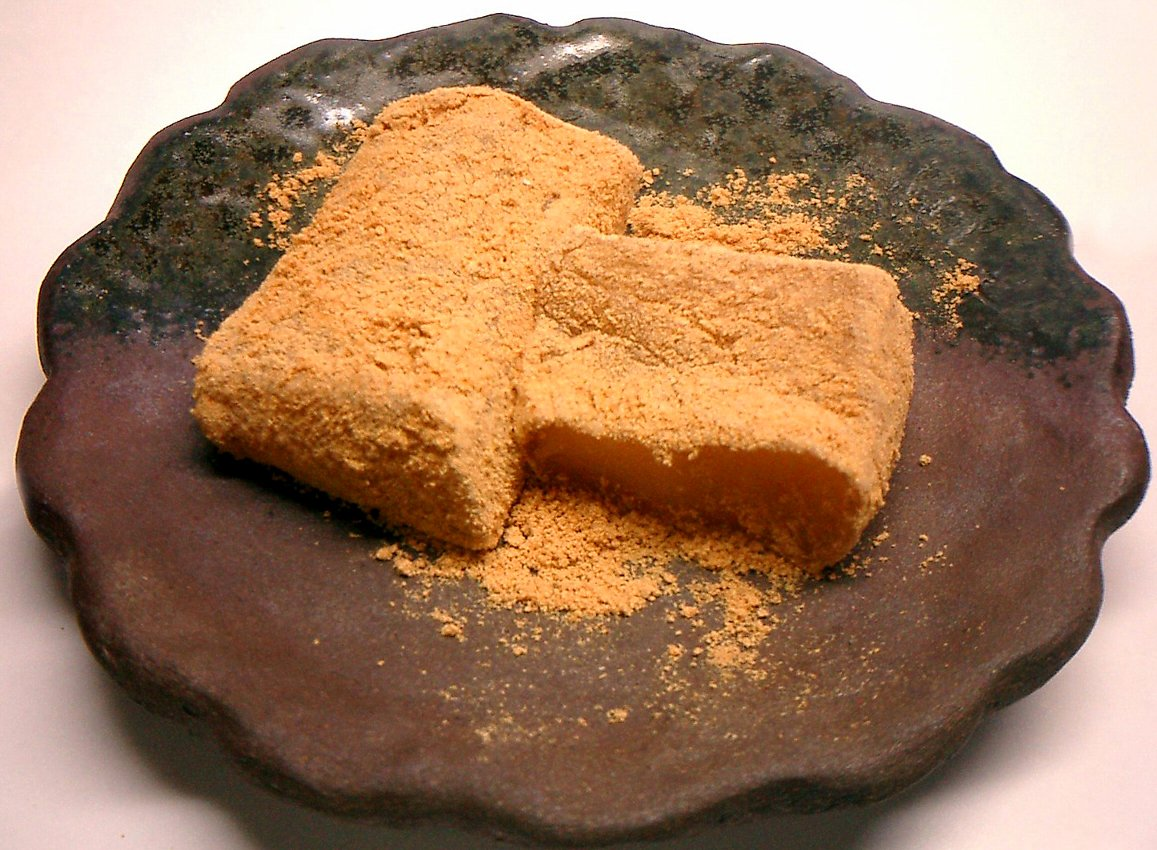
Kurumimochi (rice cake) covered in kinako

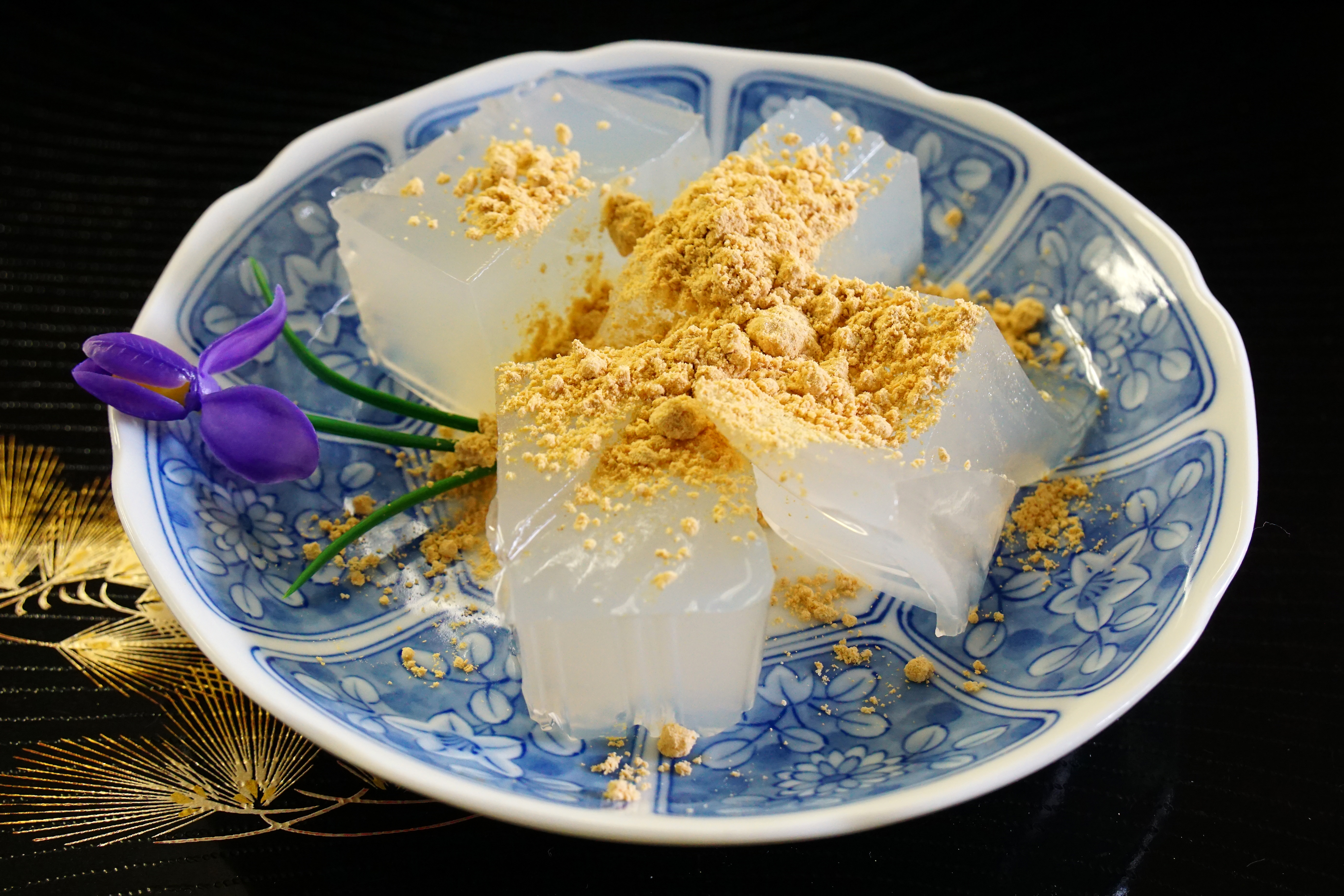
Kuzumochi with kinako

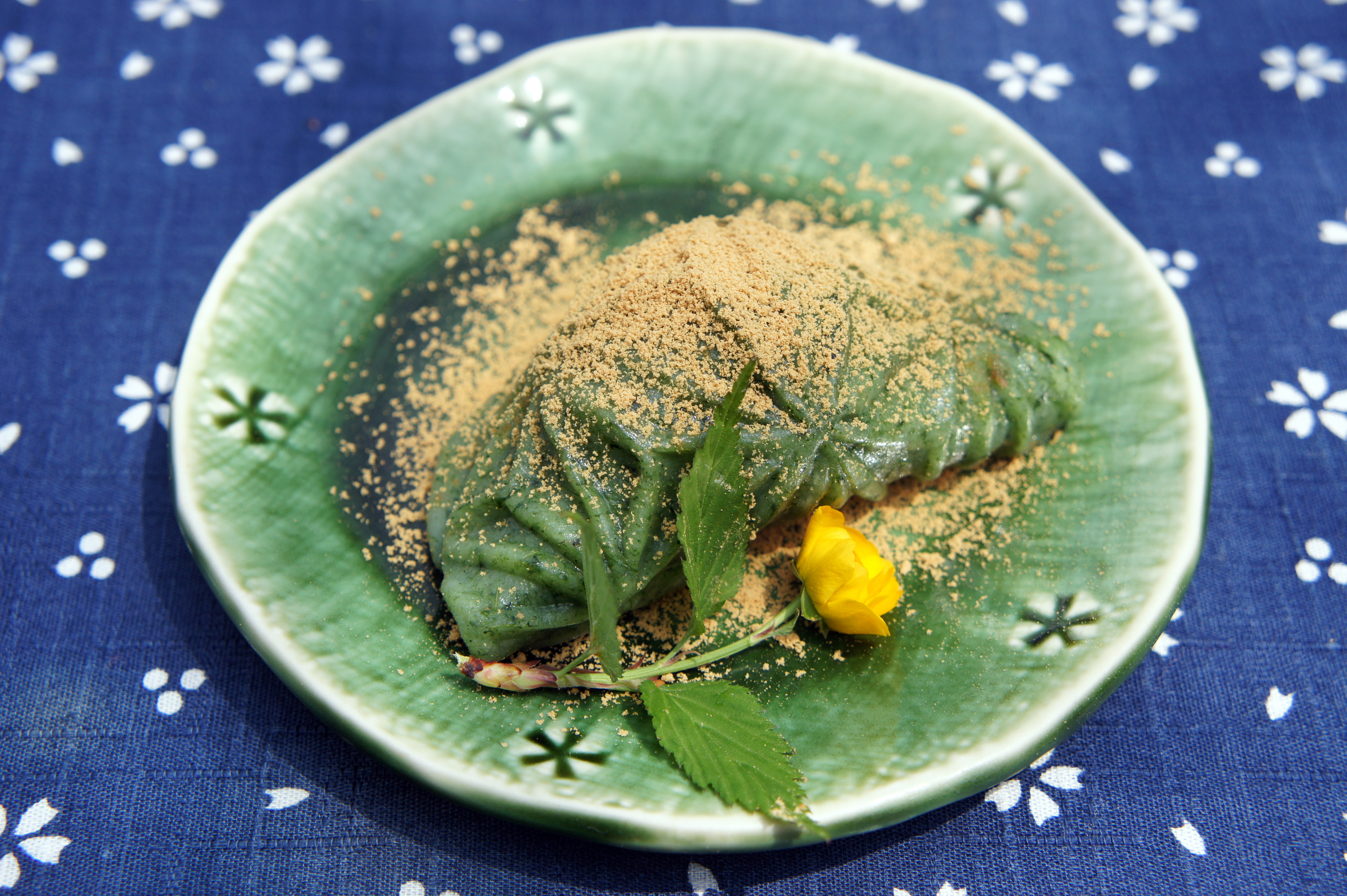
Kusa mochi covered in kinako

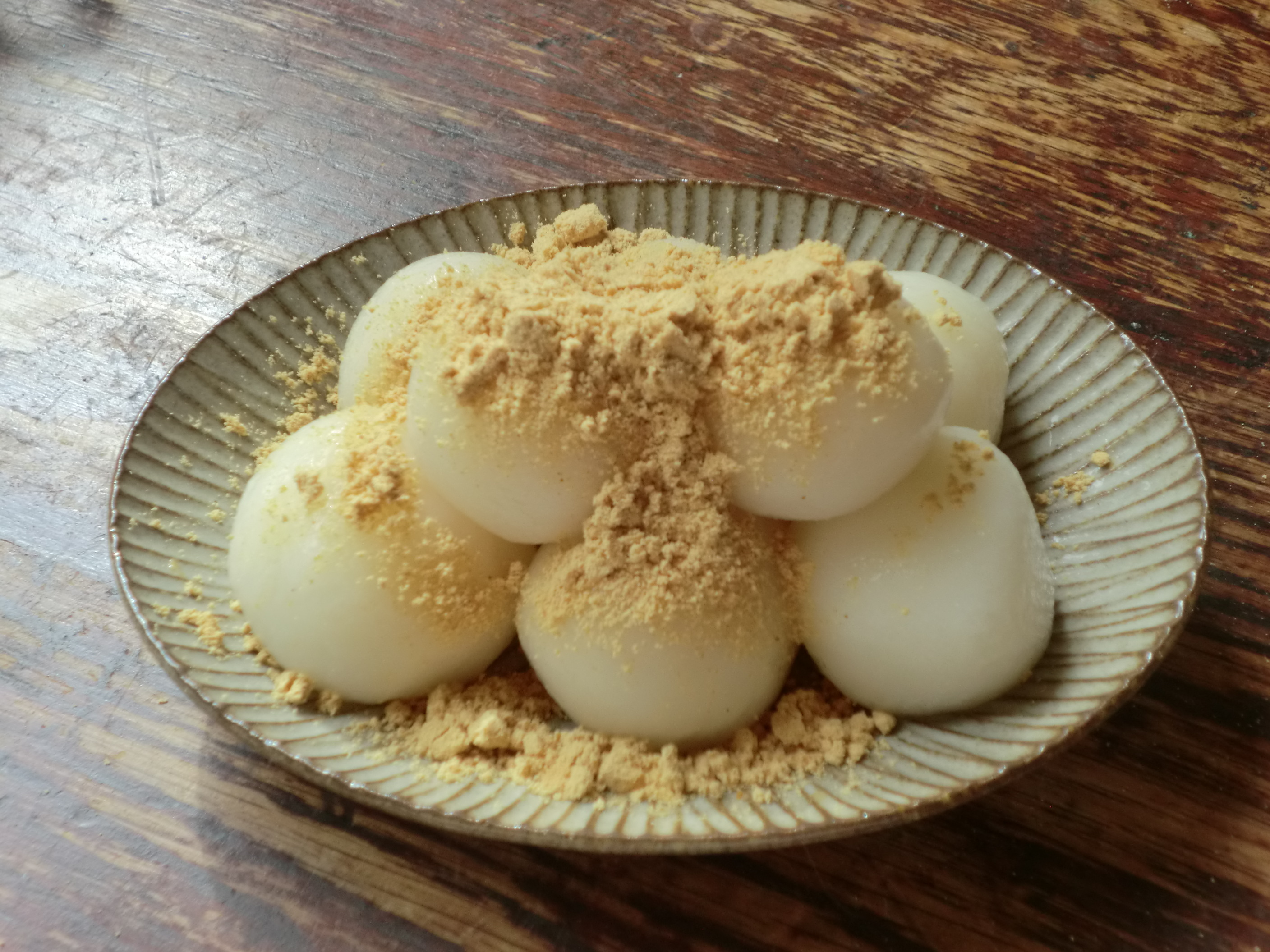
Dango (rice flour dumplings) covered in kinako

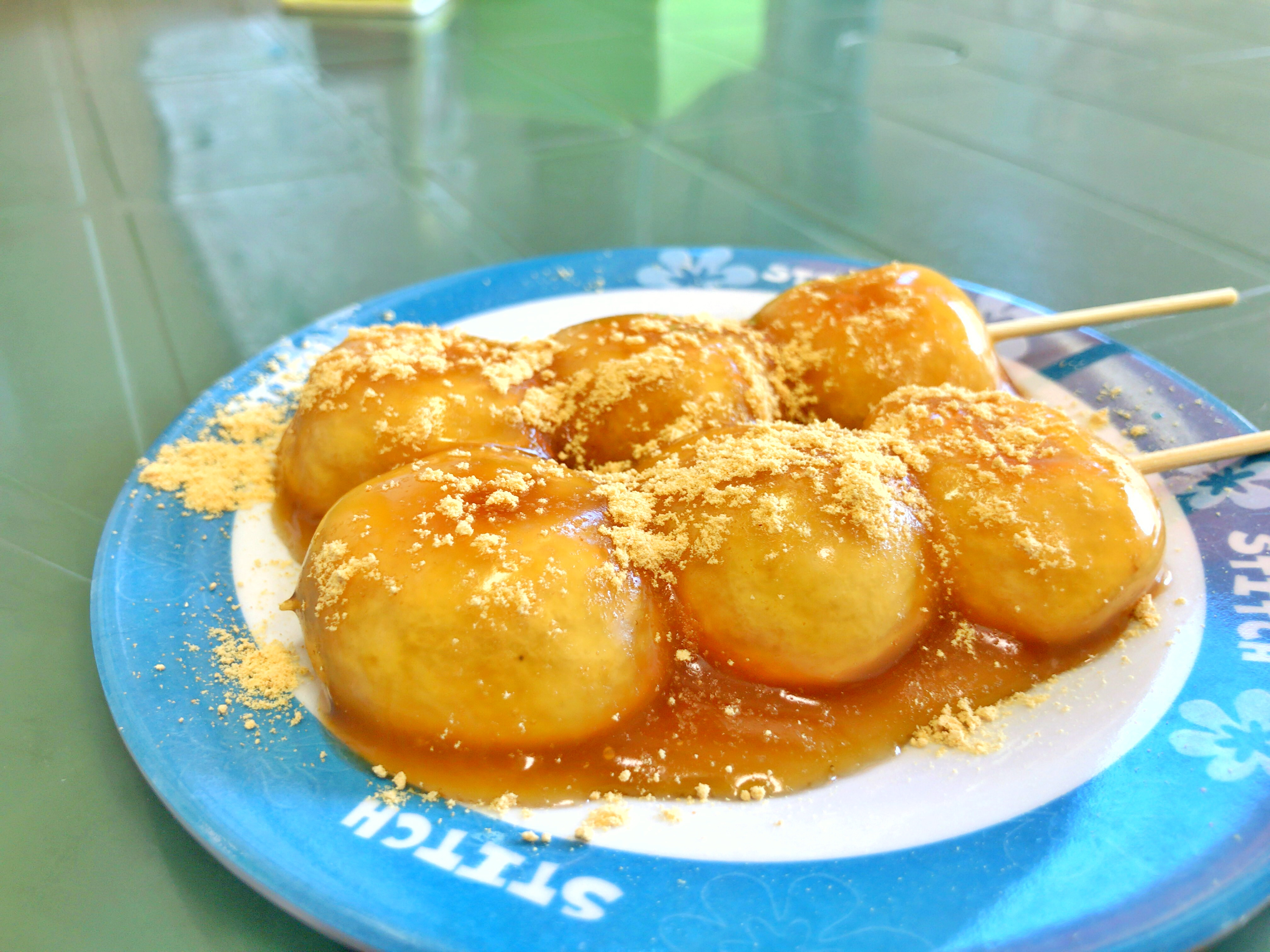
Dango with kinako

== Nutrition ==
Being composed of soybeans, kinako is a nutritious topping and source of flavor, containing B vitamins and protein. Compared to boiled soybeans, however, the protein in kinako is not easily digested.

== See also ==
- List of soy-based foods
- Pinole
- Besan
- Matcha, green tea powder
- Gofio, almost identical elaboration from other staple food.
