= Fornaci di Barga railway station =

Railway station in Tuscany, Italy

Fornaci di Barga
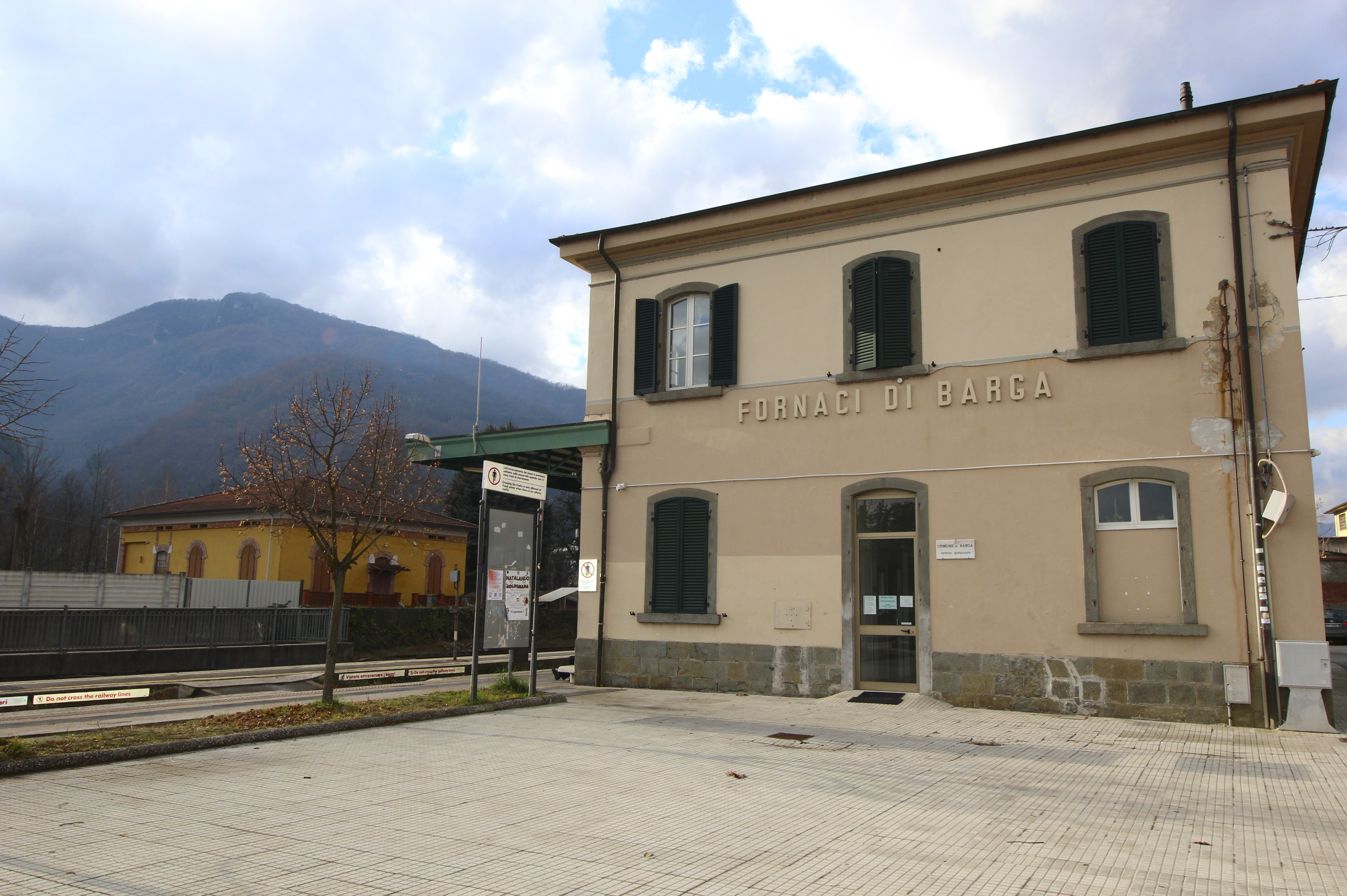
- Fornaci di Barga's passenger building

General information
- Location: Fornaci di Barga, Province of Lucca, Tuscany; Italy
- Coordinates: 44°2′43.55″N 10°28′23.93″E
- Operator: Rete Ferroviaria Italiana
- Line: Lucca–Aulla
- Platforms: 2
- Tracks: 2
- Train operators: Trenitalia
- Connections: Local buses

Other information
- Classification: Bronze

History
- Opened: 27 July 1911; 115 years ago

Services
Ghivizzano-Coreglia railway station	Lucca–Aulla	Barga-Gallicano railway station
Location
- Location within Tuscany Location within Italy

Fornaci di Barga railway station (Italian: Stazione di Fornaci di Barga) is a railway station located in the Tuscany region of central Italy serving Fornaci di Barga – a frazione of nearby Barga.

Built as Barga-Fornaci and opened in 1911, Fornaci di Barga forms part of the Lucca–Aulla railway. The station is served exclusively by regional trains operated by Trenitalia, whilst the station itself is managed by Rete Ferroviaria Italiana (RFI), both of which are subsidiaries of Italy's state-owned rail company Ferrovie dello Stato (FS).

The station previously had an important freight yard, processing goods for a local copper-processing plant operated by KME Group.

On 10 April 1912, the body of poet Giovanni Pascoli was met by crowds at the station on arrival by train from Bologna, where he had died.
