= Lucca–Aulla railway =

Railway line in Italy

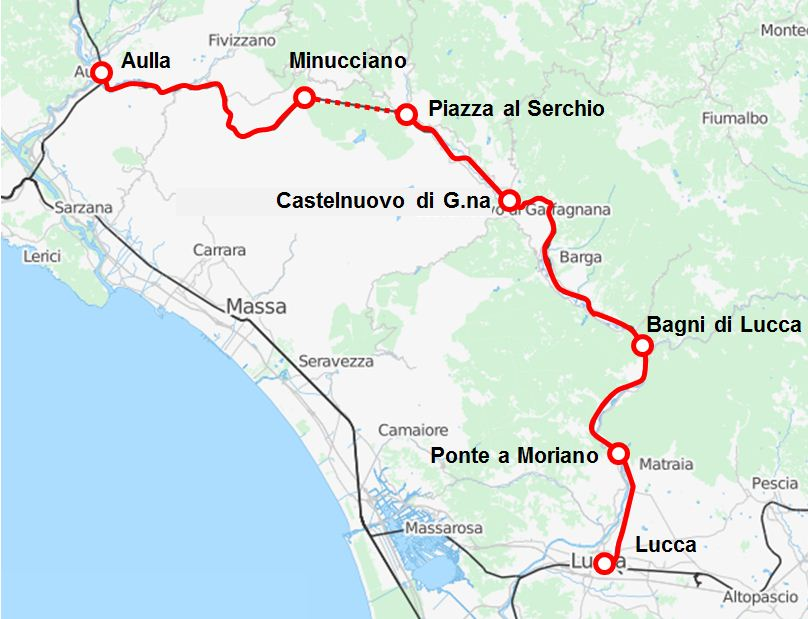

Overview
- Status: in use
- Owner: RFI
- Locale: Tuscany, Italy
- Termini: Lucca; Aulla

Service
- Type: Heavy rail
- Operator(s): Trenitalia

History
- Commenced: 1892
- Completed: 1959

Technical
- Line length: 89 km (55 mi)
- Track gauge: 1,435 mm (4 ft 8 1/2 in) standard gauge

The Lucca-Aulla railway also known as the Garfagnana railway is an Italian railway branch line. Running from the city of Lucca the line crosses the Garfagnana and Lunigiana regions to join the Parma–La Spezia railway in Aulla.

The railway is managed by Rete Ferroviaria Italiana (RFI) and passenger traffic is operated by Trenitalia, both of which are subsidiaries of Italy's state-owned rail company Ferrovie dello Stato (FS).

== Route ==
The railway begins at Lucca railway station, crossing the Via Pesciatina, which until 1957 housed the metric gauge track of the Lucca–Monsummano electric tramway to Pescia. After passing the suburb of San Pietro a Vico the line reaches Ponte a Moriano, the terminus of the first stretch of the railway to be built and once home to a both a factory connected to the railway station as well as the Lucca–Ponte a Moriano steam tramway.

In almost flat territory the line passes the now-closed Piaggione station and another siding, this time to a factory owned by Italian paper company Lucart. The railway calls at two stations serving the town of Borgo a Mozzano before passing under a purpose-built fornix in the Ponte della Maddalena and following the Serchio river to the spa town of Bagni di Lucca.

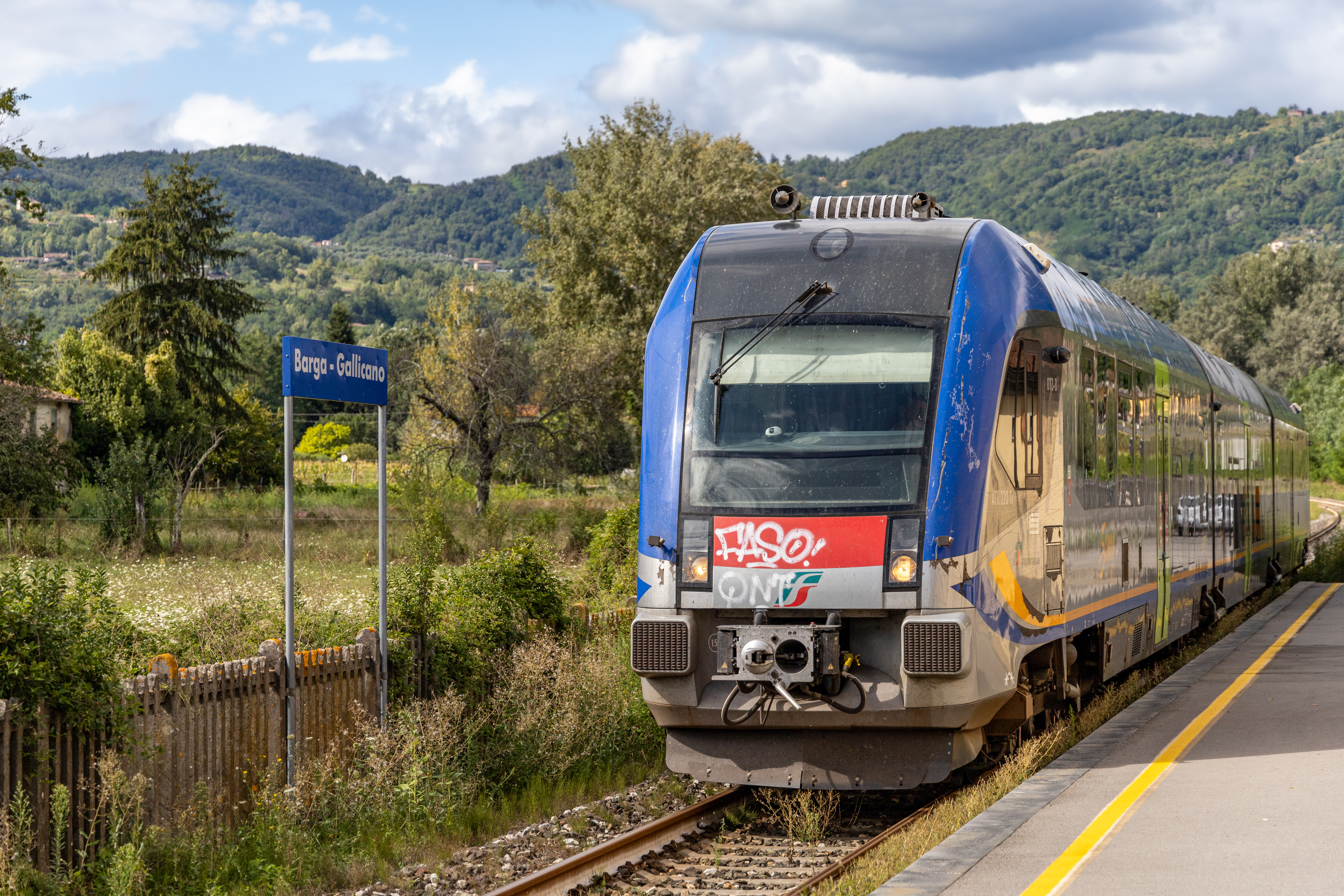

Passing two disused stations, and a junction leading to a paper mill, the line continues to Fornaci di Barga railway station where further sidings previously served the Europa Metalli plant now operated by KME Group. Two further stops serve the town of Barga: Barga-Gallicano railway station and Castelvecchio Pascoli railway station, the latter named for the famous Italian poet Giovanni Pascoli.

The line continues uphill serving stops at Fosciandora-Ceserana, Castelnuovo di Garfagnana, Villetta San Romano, Poggio-Careggine-Vagli and Camporgiano.

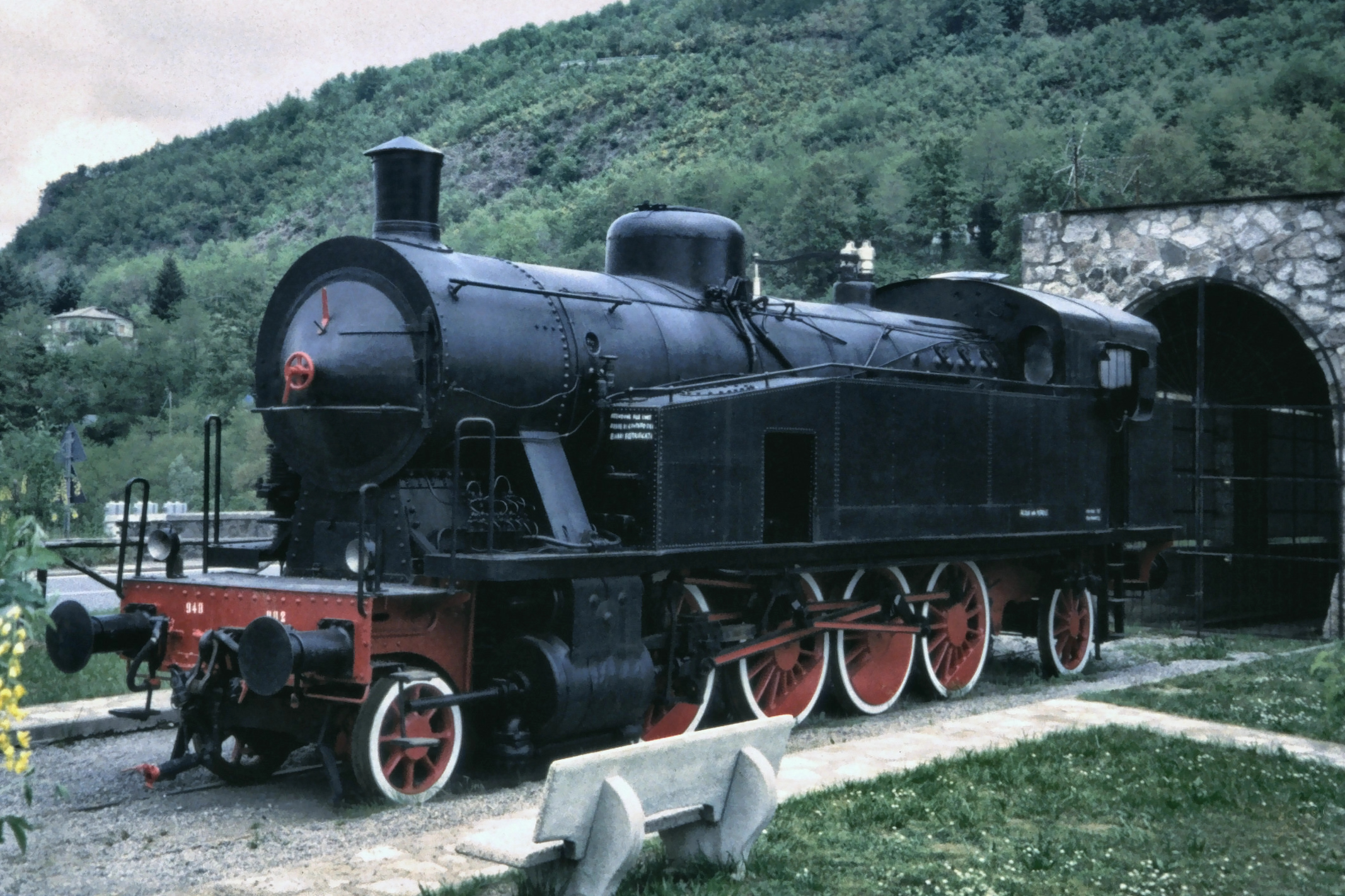

Arriving at Piazza al Serchio the line comes to the outer reaches of the Garfagnana region from which it takes its traditional name. In memory of the steam locomotives that formerly operated on the Lucca–Aulla railway, an FS Class 940 locomotive is preserved here as a monument.

From here the railway passes through the Lupacino tunnel which at 7,515 metres (4.670 mi) is the longest of the line. Onwards to Minucciano-Pieve-Casola and the town of Equi Terme the line reaches the steepest incline of its route heading onwards to Monzone-Monte dei Bianchi-Isolano.

Heading onwards through the Lunigiana further stops pass through Gragnola and on through the territory of Fivizzano with stops at Rometta-Soliera and Gassano. From here the line passes former explosives factory sidings to enter a new track layout introduced in 2008 to reach the end of the line at Aulla.

== Technical specification ==
The line is non-electrified single-track and operates under a remotely managed control system based in Pisa. It is equipped with an electric signalling block system and uses Sistema Controllo Marcia Treno (SCMT) throughout. The SCMT equipment was activated in sections: on 24 October 2021 between Piazza al Serchio and Aulla, on 27 June 2022 between Lucca and Fornaci di Barga and finally on 1 September 2022 between Piazza al Serchio and Fornaci di Barga with the subsequent decommissioning of the previous Sistema Supporto Condotta SSC earth subsystem.

== History ==
The line opened in various stages:

- 15 February 1892: Lucca–Ponte a Moriano
- 15 July 1898: Ponte a Moriano–Borgo a Mozzano
- 8 June 1899: Borgo a Mozzano–Bagni di Lucca
- 27 July 1911: Bagni di Lucca–Castelnuovo di Garfagnana
- 4 December 1911: Aulla–Gragnola
- 25 March 1912: Gragnola–Monzone
- 1 August 1930: Monzone–Equi Terme
- 21 April 1940: Castelnuovo di Garfagnana–Piazza al Serchio
- 3 February 1944: Minucciano–Equi Terme
- 21 March 1959: Piazza al Serchio–Minucciano

A further modification to the line was made on 18 February 2008 with the opening of new tracks between Pallerone and Aulla Lunigiana linking up with Parma–La Spezia railway.
