= Fornaci di Barga =

- Frazione
- Location of Fornaci di Barga in Italy
- Coordinates: 44°03′0″N 10°28′0″E
- Country: Italy
- Region: Tuscany
- Province: Lucca (LU)
- Comune: Barga
- Elevation: 165 m (541 ft)
- Time zone: UTC+1 (CET)
  - Summer (DST): UTC+2 (CEST)
- Postal code: 55051
- Dialing code: 0583

Fornaci di Barga, or simply Fornaci, is a frazione of Barga in the Province of Lucca, Tuscany, Italy. It is located 165 m above sea level, on the left bank of the river Serchio.

The town owes its name to lime and brick kilns (fornaci in Italian) that could once be found in the area but that have now gradually disappeared.

== History ==
The first historically documented evidence of Fornaci goes back to approximately 1000AD. The ancient village took the name of Caterozzo, today just the name of one of the four districts of Fornaci. Probably the name comes from “cala” meaning water and “tur” meaning passage, which joined together means ford, describing the original swampy territory on which the first village rose, frequently flooded by the Serchio river. The population was constituted from farmers, fishermen and breeders of cattle who traded their products with the Versiliesi (traders from Versilia, the coastal region of Tuscany) in exchange for spices. A war between the citizens of Lucca and Pope Gregory IX (1230) caused the exodus of the population of Caterozzo and some of the nearby villages to the Apennine mountains. The activity of the "Caterozzo’s Furnaces" which took advantage of the rich deposits of clay, increased in the first half of the 15th century. The village was increasingly becoming, around the various brick-kilns, what would be the centre of today’s Fornaci vecchia. Ancient documents mention the castle of Catarozzo, a sign that the village was protected by castle walls, no trace of which remain today . Thanks to the "Furnaces of Caterozzo" families the pieve of Loppia, of which only the perimeter walls, the facade and the apse remained, was reconstructed and in 1522 was reopened to the faithful. As the village evolved its name changed to become the present one. Of the ancient brick-kilns only one survives to the present day, completely restored and transformed into a shopping centre.

The main expansion of the village happened during World War I and the opening of an ammunition factory in 1915 by the Italian Metallurgical Society (Società Metallurgica Italiana – SMI) that produced shells and cartridges, providing many jobs. As a consequence many new houses had to be built for the workers, which resulted in the Fornaci of the present day. Today the factory has lost a large part of its original purpose and has become specialised in the working of copper and its alloys. In the first years of the present century the factory, today operated by KME Group, started to produce Euro coins.

Nowadays the village has become enriched by many shops and has become the commercial centre of the Serchio valley and its Garfagnana neighbour.

== Attractions ==
The central square, named 4 November and recently restructured, is the heart of the activities and the life of Fornaci. It accommodates the main events of the village and provides a meeting place for people in their free time, thanks also to the adjacent gelateria, bars, pubs and restaurants. The central square opens onto the Via Repubblica, the main street of the village on which are situated many shops, giving rise to the slogan “100 shops having a single display window”. On some festival days, for example May 1 and June 2, the road is closed to traffic and transformed into a pedestrian area. The church of Christ Redentore, constructed in a modern style, is the main church of Fornaci. It is located in the centre of the village, in Don Minzoni square. Monsignor Matteucci, archbishop of Pisa, blessed its foundation stone on May 22, 1971 and consecrated the church on September 27, 1974. The church was built on land given to the parish by Società Metallurgica Italiana which also donated copper for the roof. Inside the church is a mosaic of Christ. The bronze covering of the main door of the church is the work of professor Franco Pegonzi : Franco Pegonzi, created in commemoration of the Holy Jubilee Year 2000 Porta Santa. In the neighbourhood of the church is located the park "Felice Menichini" with a playground for children and a general purpose sports field for others. The church of Santissimo Nome di Maria in Fornaci Vecchia was erected in 1741 and is of more traditional architecture. The church became a parish church in 1923 and an “arcipretura” in 1962. Located at this church is the Romanesque pieve of Saint Maria Assumpta in Loppia. Probably already built in the 6th century, it is certain that the pieve was restored at the beginning of the second millennium at the request of countess Beatrice di Canossa and was reconsecrated on Saturday February 4, 1058 by the bishop of Lucca, Anselmo da Baggio, the future Pope Alexander II. A museum has been created in what was once the research centre of Società Metallurgica Italiana. This museum is managed by the Ing. Luigi Orlando Foundation and contains the correspondence, the archive documents, the technical drawings and samples of machinery that was used in the several plants of the group and is of great value, both historically and culturally. One of the curiosities which should be mentioned is the " fontanina dell' amore", surrounded by nature in the northern part of the village. A poem by the poet Geri di Gavinana has been dedicated to this fountain and to the lovers who visit it looking for a secluded place. A plaque positioned on the fountain reminds the poem. Fornaci is also used as a base for touring the Media Valle del Serchio and Garfagnana.

== Society and culture ==
There are many small associations that make the village alive in various fields (sport, theatre, cultural, commerce, etc.). The most active and long-standing of these in the life of the village are:

- US Fornaci, a soccer club founded in 1928. The greatest achievements of this club were to reach league C in the soccer championship of 1940-41, and to organise the annual "Ciminiera d' Argento" event, presented by Franco Ligas, which gives prizes to sports personalities who have distinguished themselves in their specialities on a national and international level. Examples of these personalities are Mario Cipollini, Juri Chechi, Omar Sivori, Andrea Lucchetta, Bruno Pizzul and Fabrizio Maffei. During the last few years the club has concentrated mainly on younger players, and with its 250 players in the various teams it represents one of the more important soccer nurseries in the entire Lucca area.
- Gruppo mineralogico paleontologico (1973)
- Theatre group "The Mercantidarte" (1981) which prepares shows and organizes amateur theatrical seasons in the Theatre G. Pascoli of Fornaci.
- Judo Club Fornaci (1963) which numbers some Italian champions amongst its various athletes.
- Comitato Fornaci Vecchia. Which organises the prizes "Fornacino dell' anno" and "Aia d' Argento".
- Moto Club Fornaci
- Sport Fishing Club Fornaci.
- Volley Club Fornaci
- Cycle Club Fornaci.
- Schola cantorum (1939).
- CIPAF (Traders, Manufacturers, Professionals, Fornaci Craftsmen)
- Comitato paesano.

The most important of the village festivals are:

- the patron saint’s day (St. Anthony, Abbot on 17 January, with its fair which is held in the old part of the village);
- the first of May, a celebration of flowers and motor vehicles which attracts thousands of people from the neighbourhood every year. This event started in 1960 on the initiative of the Fornaci Motorcycle Club and has been joined over the years by the Gruppo mineralogico paleontologico, US Fornaci, the Volley Club Fornaci, and the Sport Fishing Club;
- In the month of May, at sunset, it is traditional to recite the rosary close to the several "maestaine" (roadside shrines in stone or brick containing the image of the Madonna). These shrines are located in various parts of the village and on these occasions are adorned with fresh flowers and lit by small candles.
- In the month of June the festival of Christ Redeemer takes place when the streets leading to the church are decorated with flowers. This festival (the third Sunday in June) is preceded by competitions between different parts of the village (Rione Case Operaie, Centro, Caterozzo, Fornaci Vecchia). These culminate in the Riondama, a game of draughts played with human pieces in costume;
- In the month of August the Comitato Fornaci Vecchia awards the Aia d’Argento prize for sport, social and cultural achievements;
- In the commercial area of Fornaci, in the first fortnight of August, takes place "Agosto a Fornaci" organised by CIPAF when shops are open till late at night and there are commercial promotions, folklore initiatives and entertainment.

The weekly market is held on Friday mornings.

== Gallery ==
4 November square

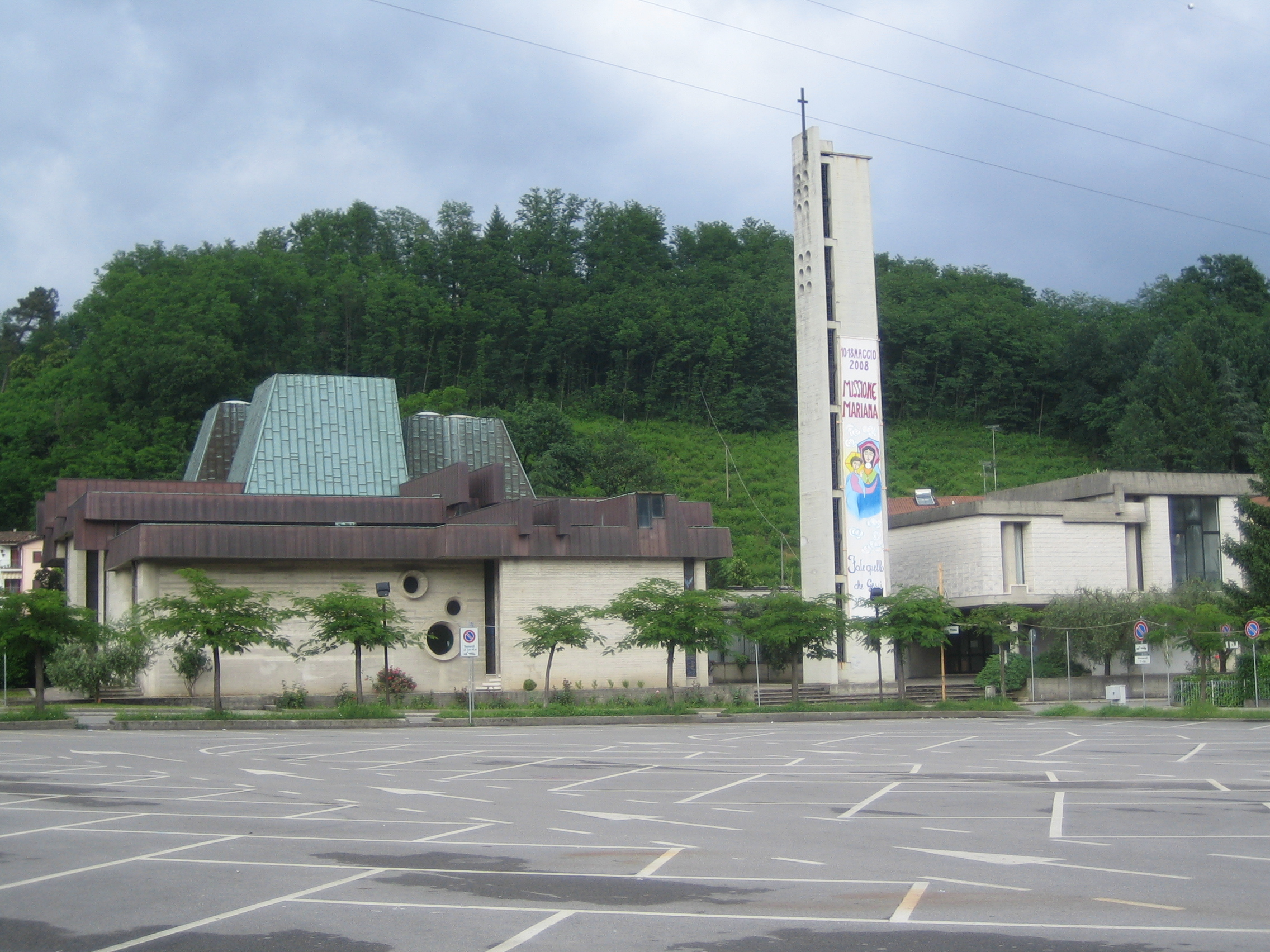
Cristo Redentore Church

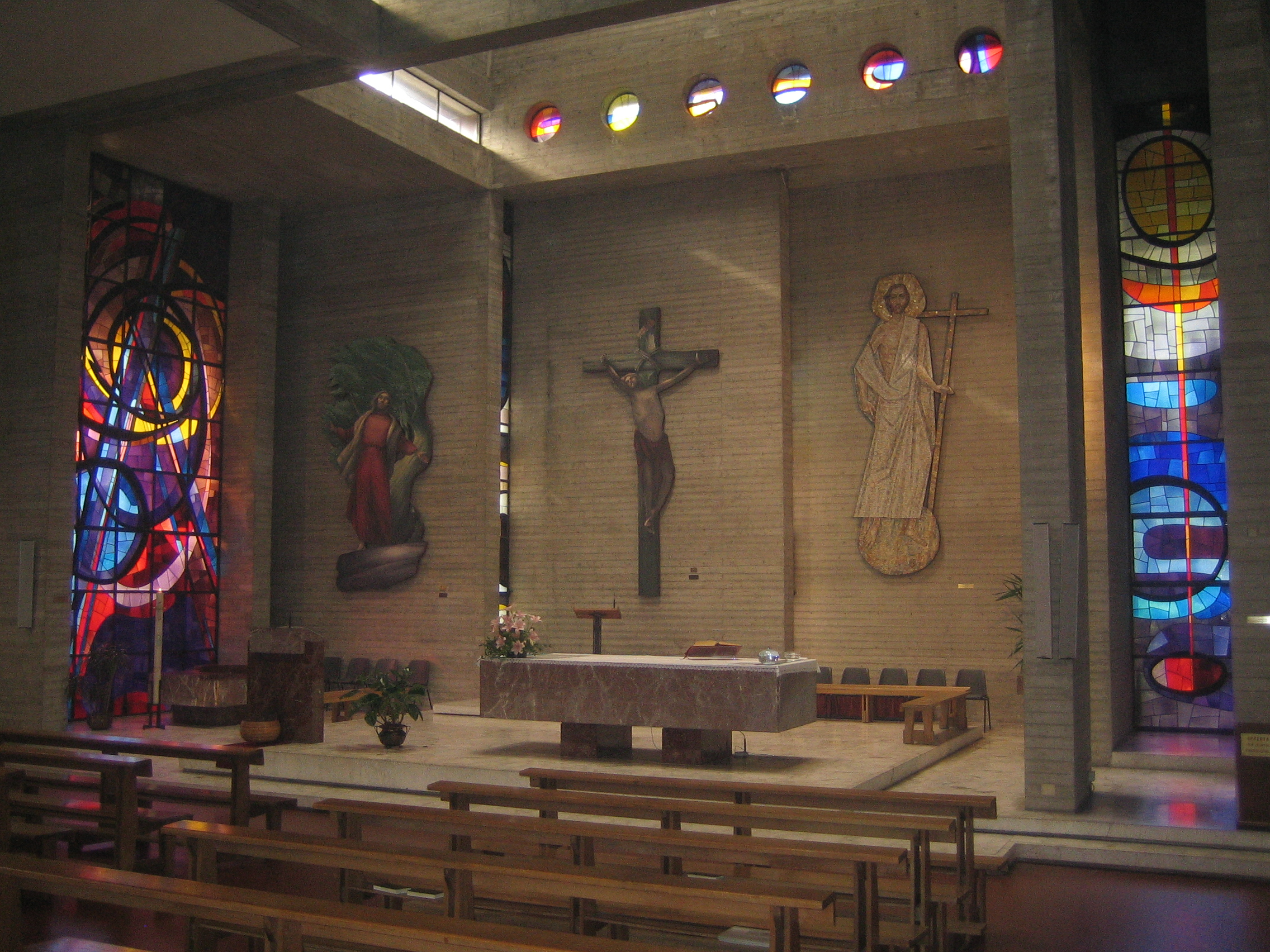
Cristo Redentore Church

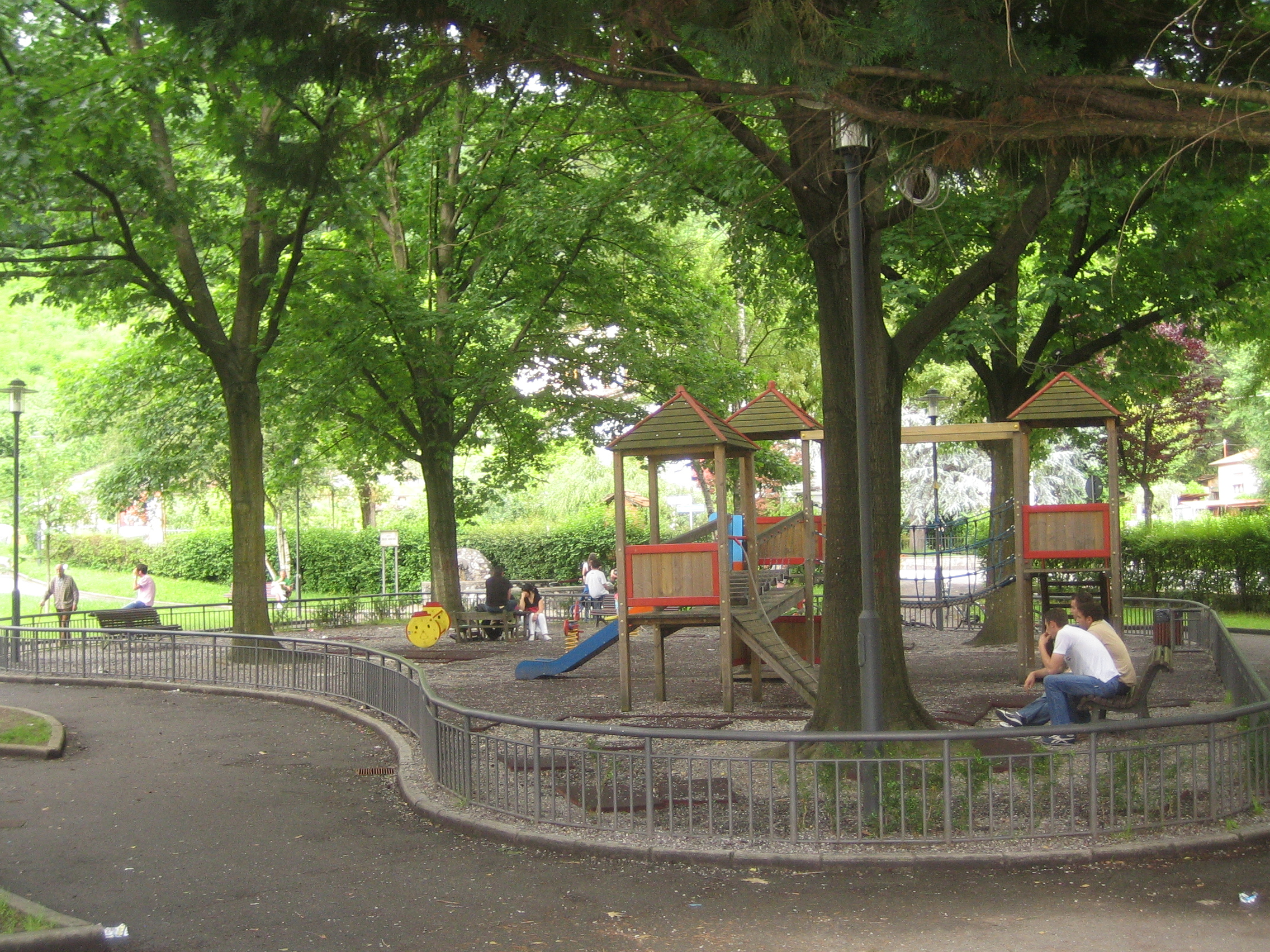
Felice Menichini's park

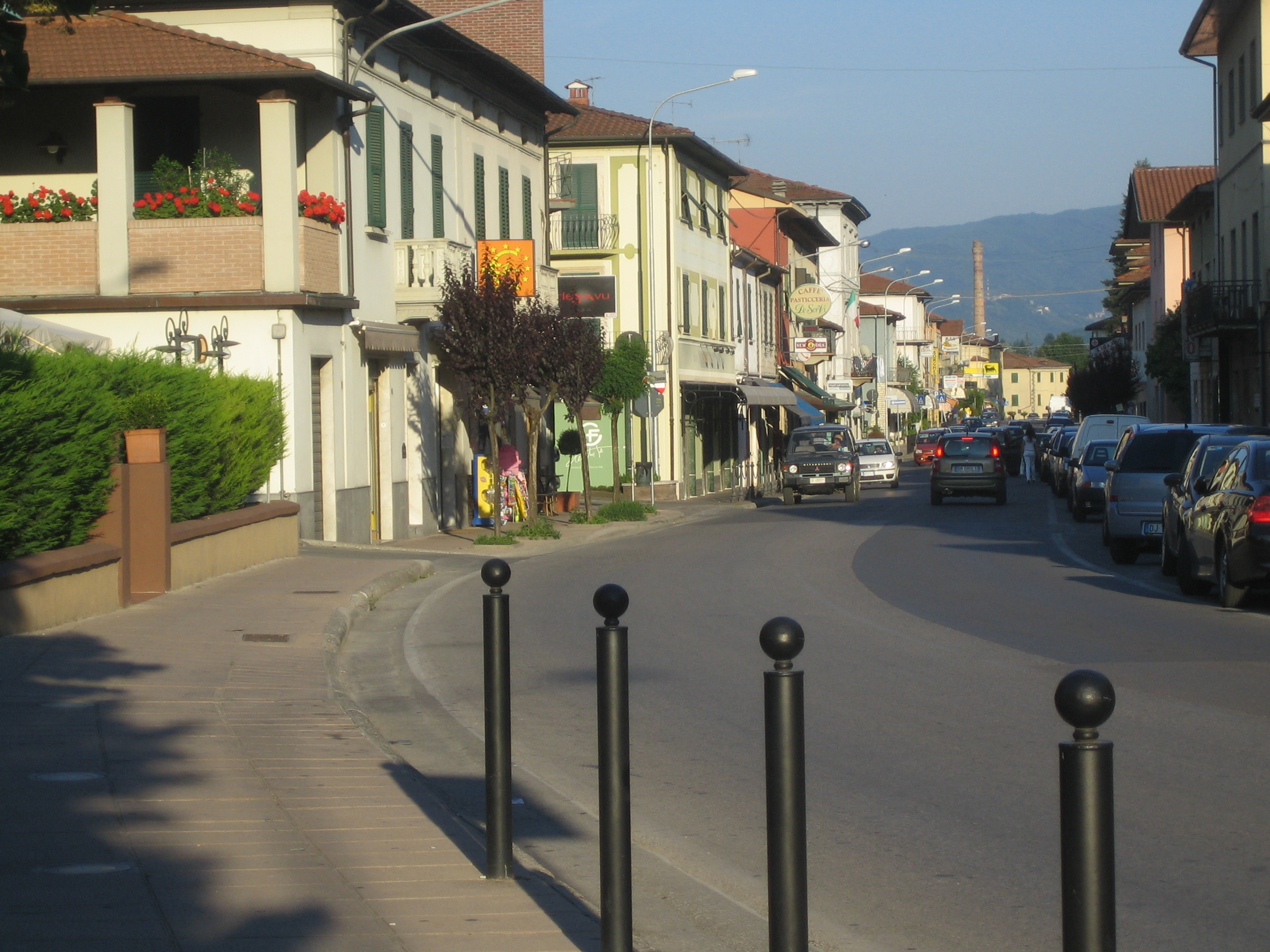
Republic street

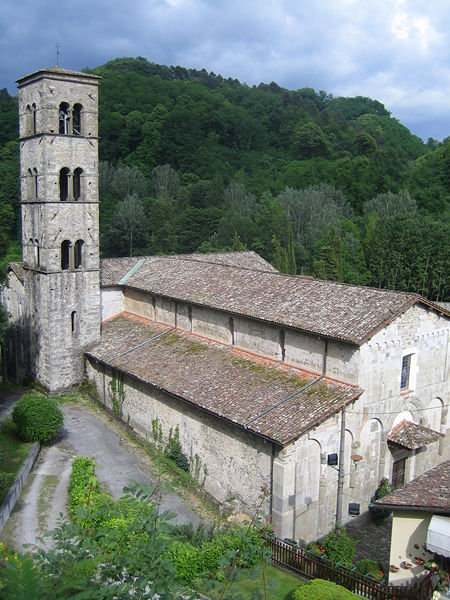
S.Maria Church in Loppia

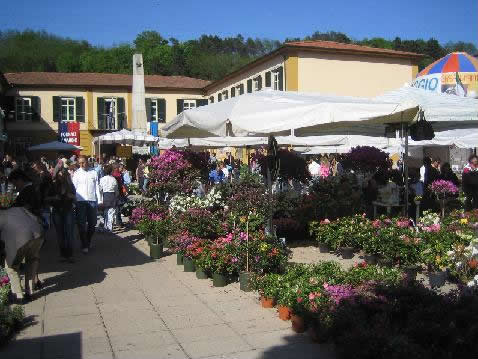
4 November square in the expo of May 1

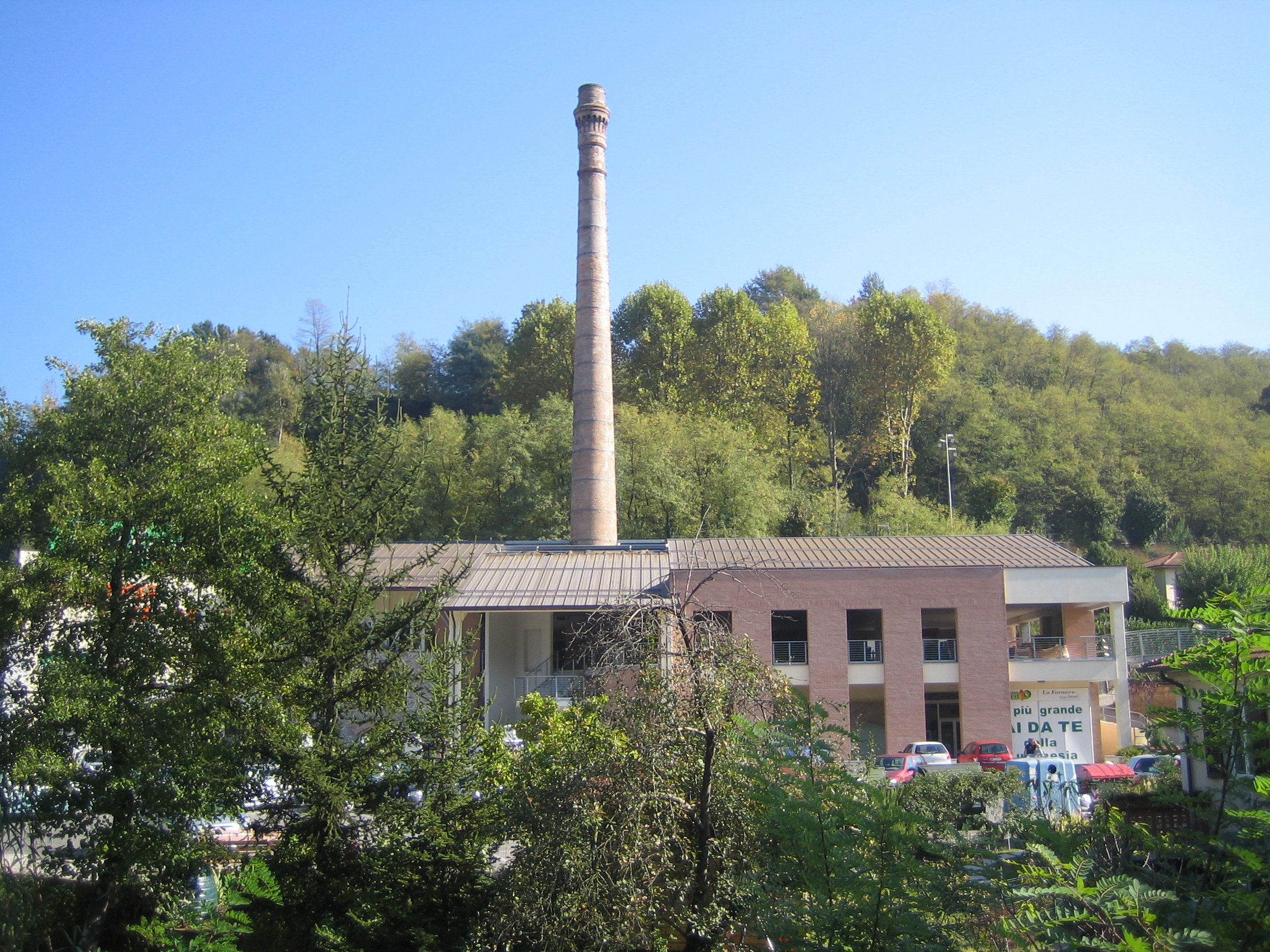
The ancient chimney

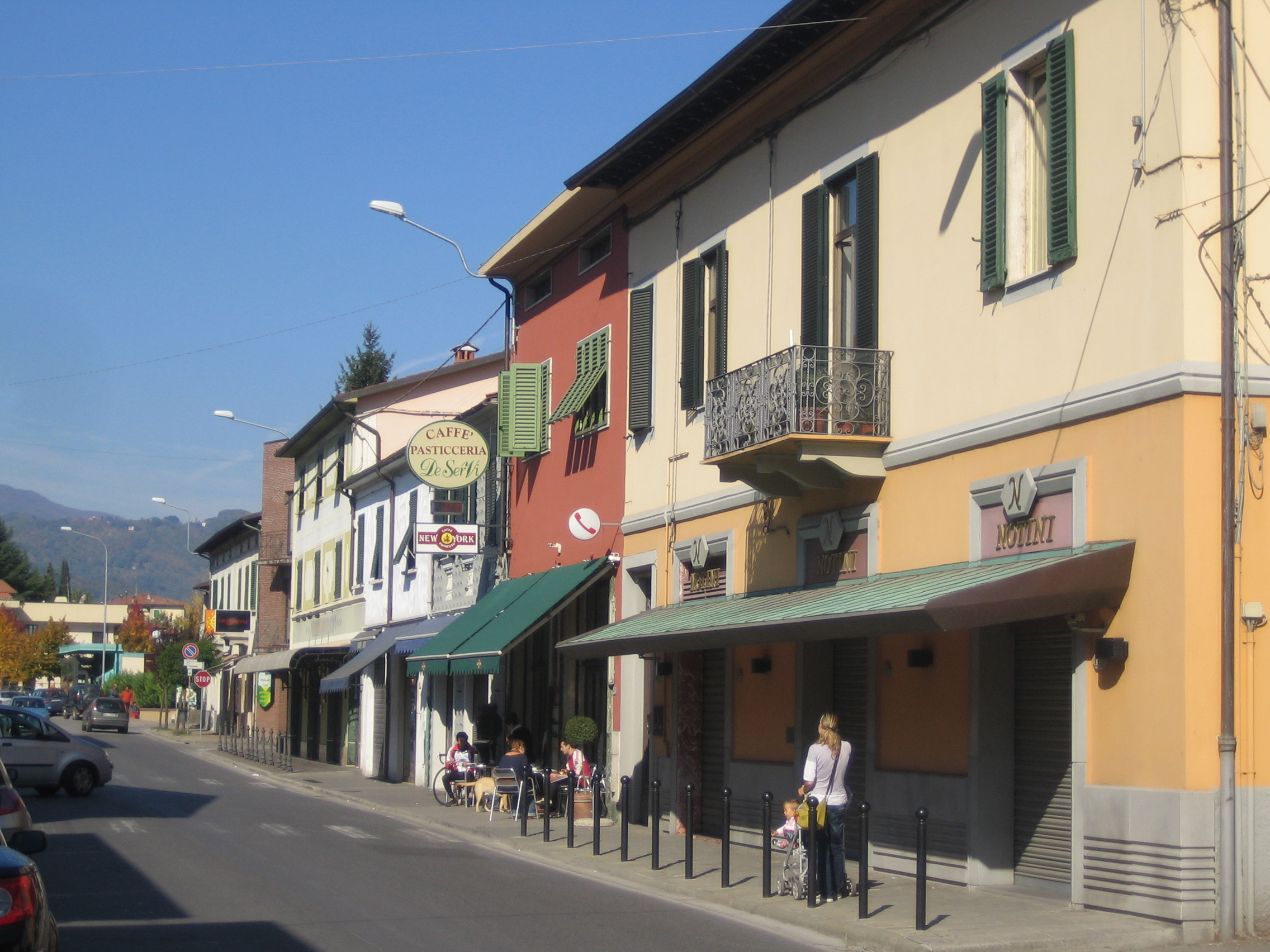
Republic street

== Transport ==
- Car: Fornaci can be reached from Lucca by means of the SS Lodovica road which continues into the heart of Garfagnana. Public transport services are available for those without cars.
- Train: Fornaci di Barga railway station serves the town with train services operating to Lucca.
- Air: the nearest commercial airport is Pisa International Airport.
