= Italica (disambiguation) =

Italica was an ancient Italic settlement.

Italica may also refer to:

- Italica Press, American publisher
- Italica Group, a cultivar group of cabbage family
- Air Italica, defunct Italian airline
- Italica (fungus), a genus of fungus in the Phaeosphaeriaceae family

== See also ==
- ; includes a long list of plant subspecies and varieties dubbed something italica
