= Castelvecchio Pascoli railway station =

Railway station in Tuscany, Italy

Castelvecchio Pascoli
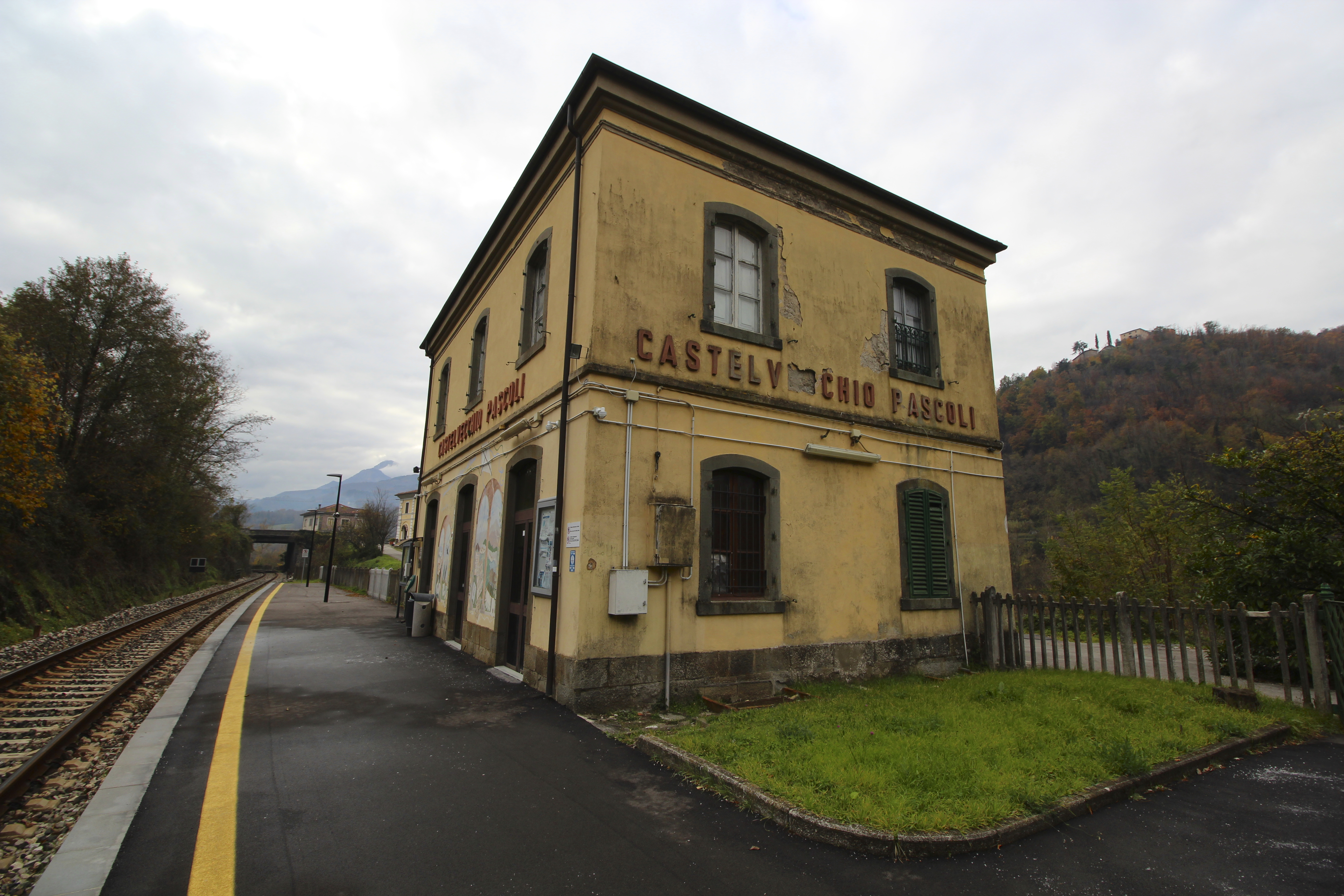
- Castelvecchio Pascoli's passenger building

General information
- Other names: Barga–Castelvecchio
- Location: Castelvecchio Pascoli, Province of Lucca, Tuscany; Italy
- Coordinates: 44°5′24.53″N 10°27′17.97″E
- Operator: Rete Ferroviaria Italiana
- Line: Lucca–Aulla
- Platforms: 1
- Tracks: 1
- Train operators: Trenitalia

Other information
- Classification: Bronze

History
- Opened: 27 July 1911; 115 years ago

Services
Barga-Gallicano railway station	Lucca–Aulla	Fosciandora-Ceserana railway station
Location
- Location within Tuscany Location within Italy

Castelvecchio Pascoli railway station (Italian: Stazione di Castelvecchio Pascoli) is a railway station located in the Tuscany region of central Italy serving Castelvecchio Pascoli. The station is situated in the Ponte di Campia frazione, on the east bank of the Serchio river.

Built as Barga-Castelvecchio and opened in 1911, Castelvecchio Pascoli forms part of the Lucca–Aulla railway. The station is served exclusively by regional trains operated by Trenitalia, whilst the station itself is managed by Rete Ferroviaria Italiana (RFI), both of which are subsidiaries of Italy's state-owned rail company Ferrovie dello Stato (FS).
