= San Mauro Mare =

Seaside tourist resort in italy

- Frazione
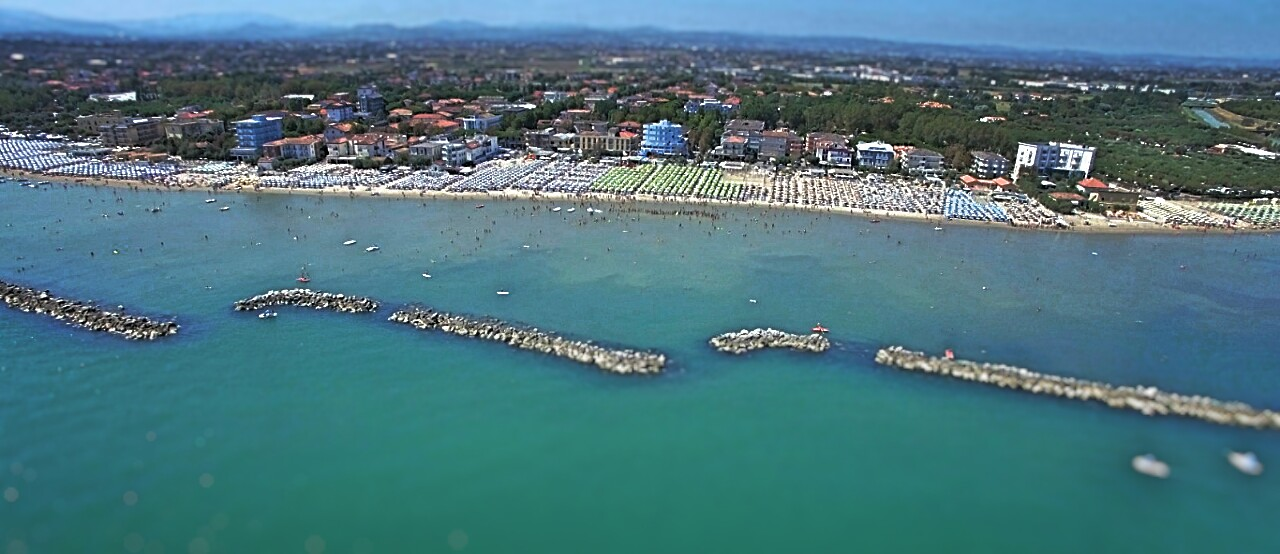

- Location of San Mauro Mare in Italy
- Coordinates: 44°09′49″N 12°26′47″E
- Country: Italy
- Region: Emilia-Romagna
- Province: FC
- Comune: San Mauro Pascoli

Area
  - Total: 0.45 km^{2} (0.17 sq mi)
- Elevation: 2 m (6.6 ft)

Population (2021)
  - Total: 1,316
  - Density: 2,900/km^{2} (7,600/sq mi)
- Time zone: UTC+1 (CET)
  - Summer (DST): UTC+2 (CEST)
- Postal code: 47030
- Dialing code: 0541
- Patron saint: St. Maria Goretti
- Saint day: 6 July

San Mauro Mare is a hamlet of the Italian municipality of San Mauro Pascoli, in the province of Forlì-Cesena, in Emilia-Romagna. It is a coastal village overlooking the Adriatic Sea equidistant from Cervia and Rimini.

== History ==
=== 19th century ===
In 1827 the Municipality of San Mauro di Romagna was born, overlooking the Adriatic Sea with a coastal stretch of 700 m between the locality of Due Bocche and Cagnona, which coincide with the current Savignano a Mare and Bellaria – Igea Marina.

In October 1828, the transfer of 495 hectares of land by the Braschi family to the Roman Torlonia family led to the formation of one of the largest agricultural estates in Romagna, within which is located the coastal territory where San Mauro Mare will arise.

The subsequent land reclamation of 200 hectares between the locations of the Capanni, Torretta, Cagnona farms and the sea transformed a portion of unproductive land into an agricultural area in which mulberry and tobacco crops were to be planted, the newly reclaimed lands leading to the birth of the new coastal village.

Around 1840 the town consisted of at least two homes, one owned by the Nicoletti family and the other by the brothers Pompeo and Paolo Marcosanti, natives of Sogliano al Rubicone and owners of the Marcosanti-Ripa palace.

In January 1889 the Cesenatico-Rimini section of the Ferrara-Rimini railway was inaugurated, which was crucial for the birth of the first urban nucleus of San Mauro Mare.

=== Early 20th century ===
In 1928 with the establishment of the SS16 state road the town was connected to the entire Adriatic coast, the following year the Italian Touring Club described “San Mauro al Mare” as a group of villas one km from the new state road, with some shops and a restaurant. The beach at the time was described as being 20 to 30 m wide, flat and made up of fine sand with dunes behind it.

In 1932, by Royal Decree, the name of San Mauro di Romagna was changed to San Mauro Pascoli in honor of the poet Giovanni Pascoli and that of San Mauro al Mare became San Mauro Mare.

Until the end of the 1930s, the economy of the town remained mainly linked to agriculture and small-scale coastal fishing, with tourist activity still in its infancy.

=== Second World War ===
During the Second World War, the town was involved in the fighting on the Christa Line on the Rubicon River (Gothic Line - Fiumicino); Due to heavy rains and the resistance of the German troops, the Allied forces took from 1 to 10 October 1944 to cross the Wehrmacht's defense line and advance towards Cesenatico.

The Allied troops who reached San Mauro Mare on 27 September 1944 were composed of Greek soldiers from the 3rd Greek Mountain Brigade and those of the 2nd New Zealand Division.

The surfacing turret of a German Tobruk-type bunker is still visible in the area.

=== Post- Second World War ===
From May 1945 to July 1947, two of the sixteen prison and internment camps created by the British of the Eighth Army, part of the 370 Camp Central Mediterranean Area also known as Enklave Rimini, were set up in the San Mauro Mare area.

The two detention facilities were built in the area upstream of the state road 16 Adriatica (SS 16) and identified by the initials 5a and 5b, they were intended to accommodate mainly recalcitrants.

In the 50s of the twentieth century, tourism development began with the construction of hotels and facilities for vacationers, the economy of the country became purely touristic and reached its peak in the 70s.

On the evening of August 18, 1991, San Mauro Mare was the scene of an ambush perpetrated by the White Uno Gang, near the GEO disco; two Senegalese boys were killed and a third was seriously injured.

== Bibliography ==
- Touring Club Italiano, Guida turistica del Touring Club Italiano, Milano 1929
- Susanna Calandrini, San Mauro, Giovedìa, la Torre, Pazzini Editore 1989
- Alessandro Agnoletti, Enklave Rimini-Bellaria. Storia e storie di 150.000 prigionieri nei campi di concentramento alleati sulla costa romagnola (1945-1947), 1999
- Amedeo Montemaggi, Linea Gotica 1944 pag. 215, Editrice Museo dell'Aviazione, Rimini 2002
- Patrizia Dogliani: Rimini Enklave 1945-1947. Un sistema di campi alleati per prigionieri dell'esercito germanico, 2005
- Caterina Tiselli, Raffaello Dellamotta, Il mare di San Mauro. Storie e racconti della nostra gente, Editrice Il Ponte Vecchio 2017
- Giovanni Franco Nicoletti, Storie di San Mauro Mare in Romagna, Editrice Il Ponte Vecchio 2017
