= Grazia Verasani =

Italian writer and singer-songwriter (born 1964)

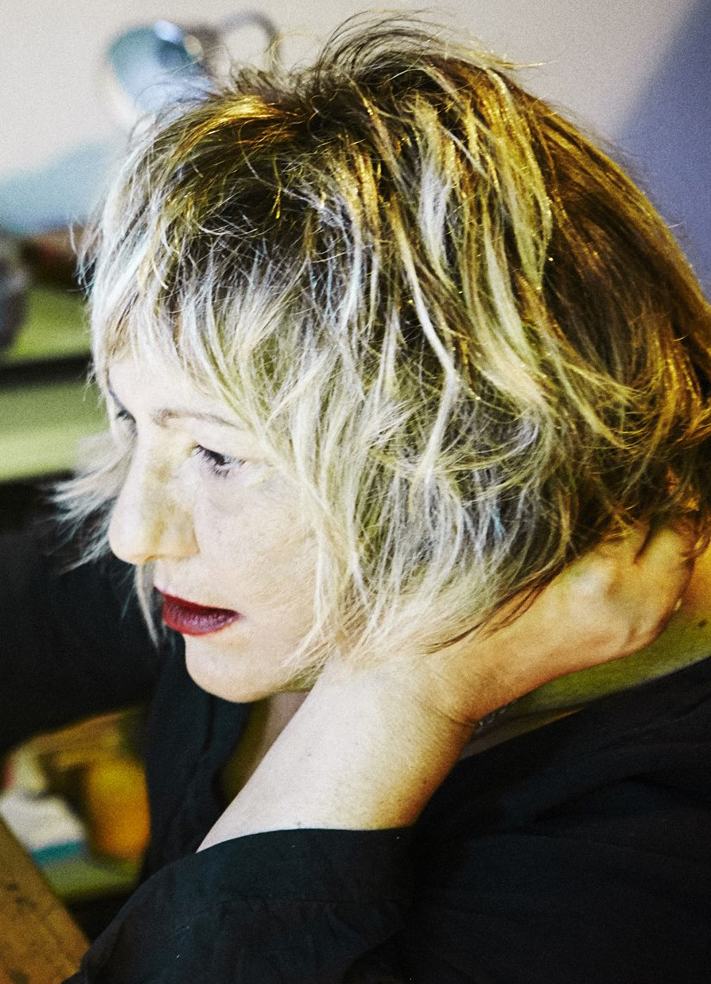
- Grazia Verasani at work.
- Born: July 8, 1964 (age 62); Bologna, Italy
- Website: www.graziaverasani.it

Grazia Verasani (born July 8, 1964, Bologna, Italy) is an Italian writer and singer-songwriter. The author of novels, plays, and screenplays she is a musician who composes, performs, and records.

== Biography ==
She graduated from the Accademia Nazionale di Arte Drammatica Silvio D'Amico in Rome at the age of twenty. After some work with the Teatro Stabile d'Abruzzo and with the Scuola del Teatro Stabile di Torino, she began writing, while continuing her work as an actor.

She has written five crime novels featuring the PI Giorgia Cantini, a private investigator in Bologna. The first, published in 2004, Quo Vadis, Baby? was made into a film the following year by Oscar-winning film maker Gabriele Salvatores. A TV series soon followed. This novel was translated into English as Quo Vadis, Baby? in 2017 and is published by Italica Press. The series also includes: Velocemente da nessuna parte (2006), which was also published in English by Italica Press (2025), Di tutti e di nessuno (2009), Cosa sai della notte (2012), and Senza ragione apparente (2015).

In 2011, Verasani won the National Dramatic Art Festival of Pesaro award for best author for her play Maternity Blues (From Medea), which was later made into a film that won the 2012 Tonino Guerra Prize for best screenplay. In 2016 Verasani published the epistolary novel. Her most recent novel (2017) is La vita com'è. Storia di bar, piccioni, cimiteri e giovani scrittori.

== Works ==
- L'amore è un bar sempre aperto, 1999, Fernandel.
- Fuck me mon amour, 2001, Fernandel.
- Tracce del tuo passaggio, 2002, Fernandel.
- From Medea, 2004, Sironi.
- Quo vadis, baby?, 2004 Oscar, Arnoldo Mondadori Editore. Quo Vadis, Baby? (English Translation) 2017, Italica Press.
- Velocemente da nessuna parte, 2006, Feltrinelli. Nowhere Fast (English Translation) 2025, Italica Press.
- Tutto il freddo che ho preso, 2008, Feltrinelli.
- Di tutti e di nessuno, 2009, Kowalsi/Feltrinelli.
- Vuoto d'aria, collana inaudita, 2010, transeuropa edizioni.
- Cosa sai della notte, collana Foxcrime 2012, Feltrinelli, pp. 223.
- Accordi minori, 2013, Gallucci.
- Mare d'inverno, 2014, Giunti Narrativa, Collana Italiana.
- Senza ragione apparente, 2015, Feltrinelli.
- Lettera a Dina, 2016, Giunti.
- La Vita com'e', 2017, La Nave di Teseo.
- Come la pioggia sul cellophan, 2020, Marsilio.
- Hotel Madridda, 2024, Marsilio.
