= Maria Pascoli =

Italian writer and poet

Mariù Pascoli
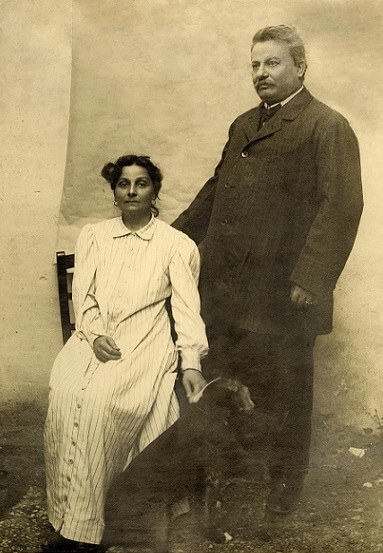
- Mariù Pascoli and her brother Giovanni
- Born: Maria Pascoli; 1 November 1865; San Mauro di Romagna, Kingdom of Italy
- Died: 5 December 1953 (aged 88); Castelvecchio Pascoli, Italy
- Occupations: Poet, prose writer.

Mariù Pascoli was the pseudonym of the Italian writer and poet Maria Pascoli (1 November 1865 – 5 December 1953). She is the sister of the poet Giovanni Pascoli, whom she assisted until his death and whose archives she kept in the house that bears his name.

== Biography ==
Born in 1865, Maria was the youngest of ten children. She lost her father at the age of two, and a year later, her older sister Margherita died also. The following year, his mother Caterina died of sorrow. Maria and her sister Ida went to live in Sogliano al Rubicone, to their maternal aunt Rita Vincenzi Alloccatelli.

Maria assisted her brother Giovanni, doing everything in her power to support him in his literary work until his death in 1912. Pascoli made her his legatee.

She lived for more than forty years, taking care of her memoirs and archival documents as well as her correspondence. She thus made a fundamental contribution to the knowledge of the details of her life.

She stayed in the villa of Castelvecchio, keeping many notes and memories in her diaries. She spontaneously approached fascism and went to Rome twice to meet Benito Mussolini, who also visited her at Casa del Poeta in 1930.

When she died in 1953, Maria bequeathed by will "the house, the chapel, the books, the papers of her brother Giovanni, the family memories and other things of the house" to the municipality of Barga.

She is buried in the chapel of her house in Castelvecchio, alongside her brother Giovanni.

== Works ==
- Maria Pascoli, Lungo la vita di Giovanni Pascoli (memories in collaboration with Augusto Vicinelli), Milan, Arnoldo Mondadori Editore, 1961

== Sources ==
- Corrado Carradini, Bruno Sereni, Omaggio di Barga a Giovanni e Maria Pascoli, Barga, Gasperetti, 1962
- Gian Luigi Ruggio, Castelvecchio Pascoli: la Casa del Poeta: ricordi e presenze, Maria Pacini Fazzi, 1997
- Maria Santini, Candida soror: tutto il racconto della vita di Mariù Pascoli, la più adorata sorella del poeta della Cavalla storna, Milan, Simonelli, 2005
