= Pascoli House Museum =

Coordinates: 44°04′31″N 10°28′55″E

- Casa Museo Pascoli
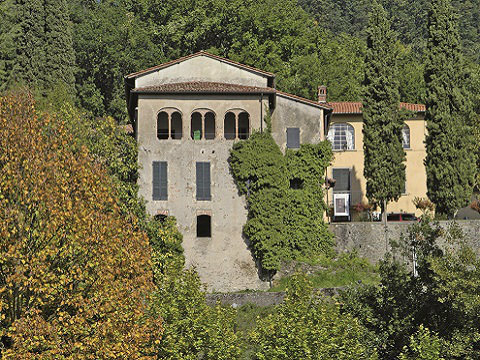
- Established: 1960, November, 1st
- Location: Castelvecchio Pascoli, Italy
- Type: Poetry museum
- Website: fondazionepascoli.it

The Pascoli House Museum (Italian: Casa Museo Pascoli) opened in Castelvecchio Pascoli, Tuscany, Italy in 1960 and is devoted to the exhibition of the Italian writer Giovanni Pascoli's personal poetry.

== History ==
Originally "Cardosi-Carrara" house, Pascoli bought it later to live and work regularly since October 15, 1895.

The idea of the museum came about in the 1950s, by his sister Mariù (Maria), who left to Barga Municipality his manuscripts, letters, various memorabilia, and personal gifts to the institution in his will.

Thanks to his sister Mariù, the house, built on three floors, has retained the appearance and structure that Giovanni Pascoli wanted during the years he lived there. The pieces reflect the tastes, friendships and knowledge, while the furniture and the many family memories reflect Mariù and the world around Pascoli.

=== The chapel ===
Near the house is a chapel. Its façade has a plaque which shows verses taken from his poem "Il Sepolcro". The chapel is where the poet and sister Maria are buried in a marble ark made by Leonardo Bistolfi; the artifacts and the frescos were created by Barghinese painter Adolfo Balduini.

== Gallery ==
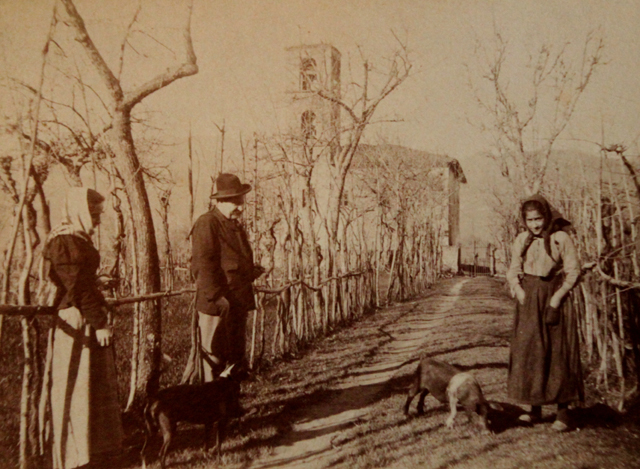
Giovanni Pascoli with two farmers

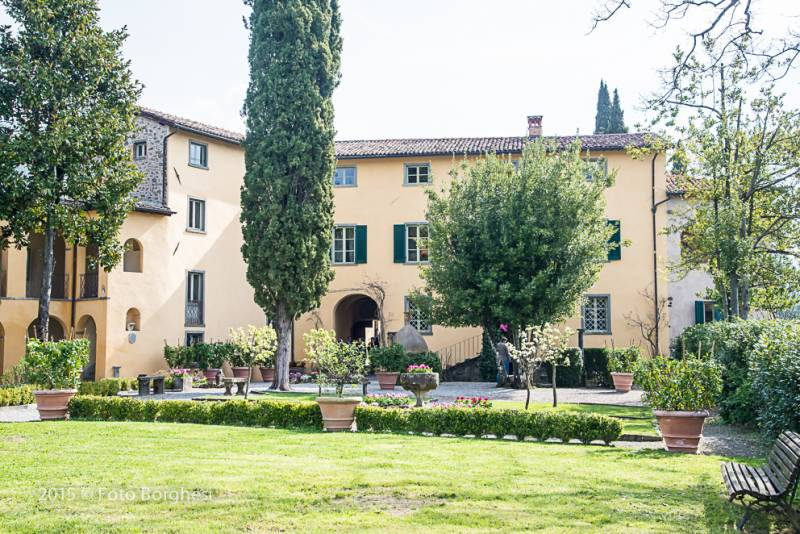
Pascoli house's garden

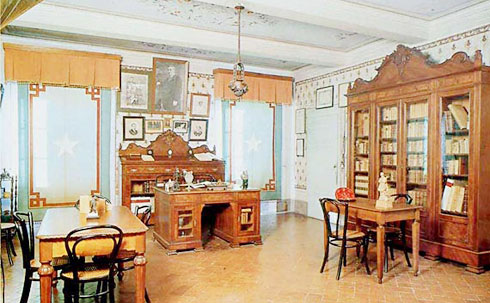
Giovanni Pascoli's desk

== Bibliography ==
- M. Pascoli, Lungo la vita di Giovanni Pascoli, Mondadori, Milan, 1961.
- G. Ruggio, Castelvecchio Pascoli. La casa del poeta, Maria Pacini Fazzi Editore, Lucca, 1997.
- U. Sereni, Giovanni Pascoli nella Valle del Bello e del Buono, Maria Pacini Fazzi Editore, Lucca, 2005.
