= Piazza al Serchio railway station =

Railway station in Tuscany, Italy

Piazza al Serchio
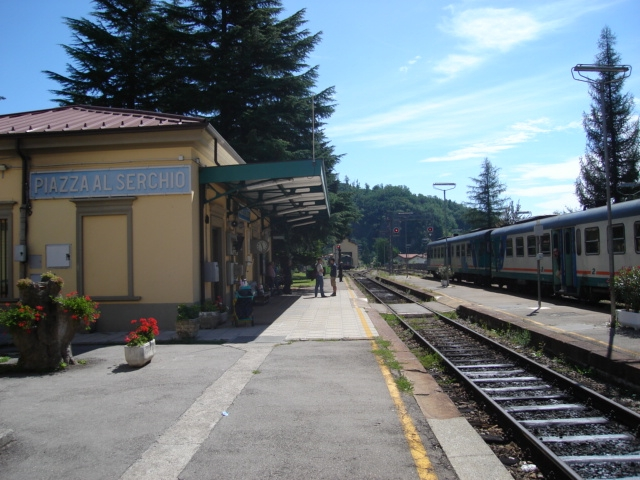
- Piazza al Serchio station building

General information
- Location: Piazza al Serchio, Tuscany; Italy
- Coordinates: 44°10′57.72″N 10°17′48.12″E
- Operator: Rete Ferroviaria Italiana
- Line: Lucca–Aulla
- Platforms: 1
- Tracks: 1
- Train operators: Trenitalia
- Connections: Local buses

Other information
- Classification: Bronze

History
- Opened: 21 April 1940; 86 years ago

Services
Camporgiano railway station	Lucca–Aulla	Minucciano-Pieve-Casola railway station
Location
- Location within Tuscany Location within Italy

Piazza al Serchio railway station (Italian: Stazione di Piazza al Serchio) is a railway station located in the Tuscany region of central Italy serving the comune of Piazza al Serchio. The station is located in the lower part of the village at an altitude of just under 500 m. It was opened on 21 April 1940.

The station forms part of the Lucca–Aulla railway and is served exclusively by regional trains operated by Trenitalia, whilst the station itself is managed by Rete Ferroviaria Italiana (RFI), both of which are subsidiaries of Italy's state-owned rail company Ferrovie dello Stato (FS).

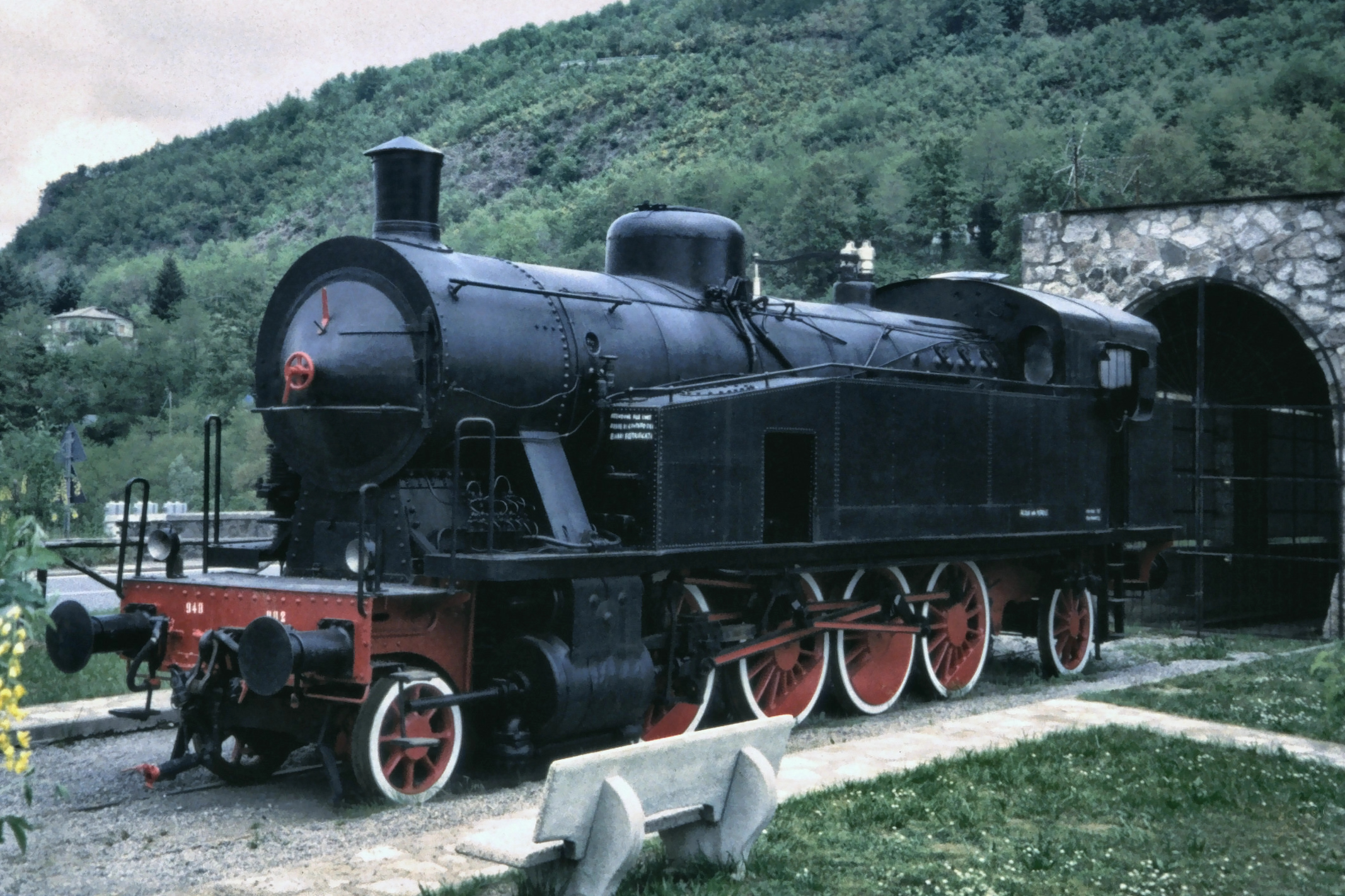
Locomotive FS 940 002 as a monument

In memory of the steam locomotives that formerly operated on the Lucca–Aulla railway, an FS Class 940 locomotive is preserved at the station as a monument. A 15 m turntable that was used to rotate the steam locomotives is also still visible at the site.
