= Giuseppe Zanotti =

Italian luxury and fashion designer (born 1957)

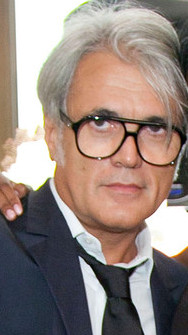
- Giuseppe Zanotti in 2013
- Born: 17 April 1957 (age 68); San Mauro Pascoli, Italy
- Occupation: Shoe designer
- Years active: 1981–present
- Website: giuseppezanottidesign.com

Giuseppe Zanotti is an Italian luxury footwear and fashion designer known for his sculptural, jeweled heels, luxury sneakers, handbags, jewelry, and leather ready-to-wear.

His wholly owned company, Vicini S.p.A., manufactures his eponymous label, distributing in 75 countries worldwide through a network of directly operated boutiques, franchisees and luxury retailers.

== Early life ==
Born on 17 April 1957, Zanotti grew up in San Mauro Pascoli, in the Emilia Romagna region of Italy which is located just outside the seaside resort of Rimini; the town and its surrounding area is known for high-end shoe-making tradition.

"I was always obsessed with shoes," Zanotti said in an interview with Harper's Bazaar Australia in 2014. "I think the first pair I remember were my mother's. I was only seven or eight and I remember being impressed with the shape of the toe."

In the 1980s, Zanotti decided to pursue a career in making women's shoes. His initial foray was as a freelance designer, working his way to recognizable fashion houses.

== Career ==
By the early 1990s, Zanotti wanted to branch out on his own and create a distinct style of footwear, particularly ornate with oversized crystals and stones usually used in the manufacturing of bijoux jewelry.

He acquired the Vicini shoe factory located in his hometown of San Mauro Pascoli and set about recasting the small company. He moved his style team there and implemented new departments specialized in producing heels and ornamental jewels.

In 1994, Zanotti traveled to New York City to present his first Giuseppe Zanotti collection to a select group of fashion editors and retailers. Saks Fifth Avenue, Neiman Marcus and Barneys New York were among the first luxury retailers to pick up the collection and remain retailers of the brand today, along with retailers like Bergdorf Goodman, Harrods, Harvey Nichols, among others.

The first Giuseppe Zanotti boutique opened in Milan in 2000, followed by additional stores in New York City, Paris, London, Moscow, Hong Kong, Miami, Los Angeles and Saint Tropez. In 2016, Giuseppe Zanotti celebrated the opening of its 100th store, at IFC in Shanghai.

Vicini Sp.A., which started as a small manufacturing entity, today counts five company-owned factories specialized in all the phases of luxury shoe making and employees 650 people who help to produce more than 600,000 pairs of shoes annually.

== Product expansion ==
Under Zanotti, Vicini introduced a line of leather luxury sneakers, melding street style with couture decorations in 2010. It featured all of Zanotti's hallmarks, including crystal embroidery, metal hardware and unexpected design contrasts.

In late 2010, Zanotti also presented his first jewelry collection. Inspired by the same decorative elements used on his stilettos and platforms, the bijoux offering featured oversized, sculptural necklace, bracelets and rings, embellished with crystals and colored stones.

In April 2024, Giuseppe Zanotti UK went into liquidation. In June 2024, court documents showed that GZ USA, Inc. filed for Chapter 11 reorganization, and the case (1:24-bk-11020) was closed on August 1, 2025, following the signing of a Final Decree pursuant to Section 350(a) and Bankruptcy Rule 3022. Final Decree signed on August 1, 2025, closing the Chapter 11 case.
