= Taije Silverman =

American poet, translator, and professor

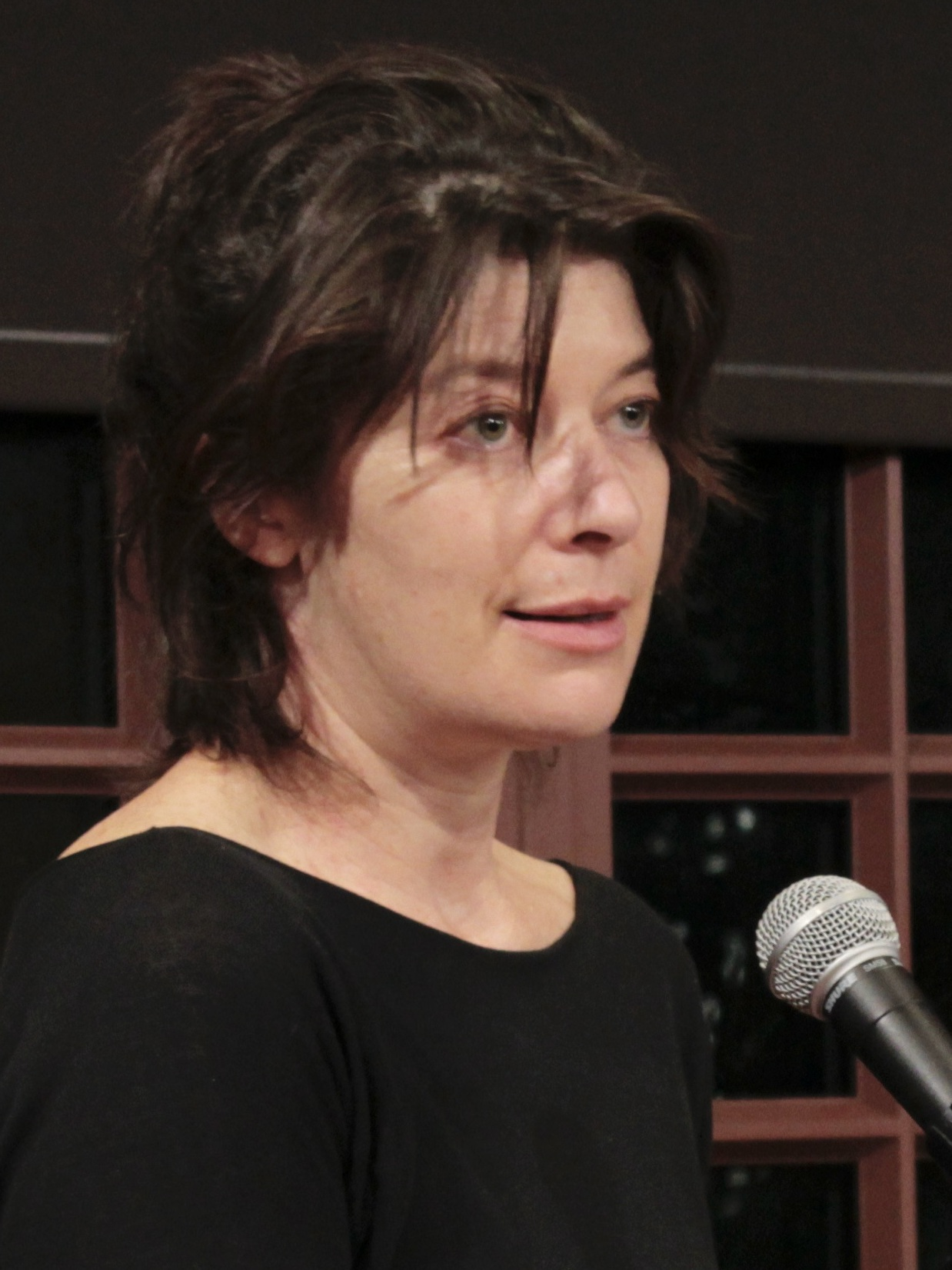
- Silverman in 2023
- Education: AB in English - Vassar College, MFA program in Poetry - University of Houston, MFA in Poetry - The University of Maryland
- Occupations: Poet, Translator, Professor

Taije Silverman is an American poet, translator, and professor. She currently teaches at the Department of English at the University of Pennsylvania.

== Biography ==
Taije Silverman was born in San Francisco, California (1974). Her father was a real estate developer and architect and her mother an art teacher. She has lived in different cities in the United States including Houston, Berkeley, Atlanta, New York, D.C., Ithaca, Princeton, and Charlottesville. She is a 1996 graduate of Vassar College.

== Literary career ==
Silverman is a widely recognized contemporary poet. She is the author of Houses Are Fields, a book of poetry, published by LSU Press in 2009, and selected as the debut book in their Sea Cliff Series; and of Now You Can Join the Others: Poems, also published by LSU Press in 2022. Houses Are Fields is about responding to her mother's death. US Poet Laureate Natasha Trethewey called Houses Are Fields "one of the most beautiful books I've read in years." Her second book has received equal praise, with Aracelis Girmay calling it "Radiant, exact, porous. Frank and sinuous. This book is an astonishment of pages struck through with the acheful blessing of love, strange and trembling with time.” Silverman's individual poems have been published in journals including Poetry, The Harvard Review, Ploughshares, Massachusetts Review, The Antioch Review and AGNI. Houses Are Fields appeared in Italian translation in 2013 (Le Case Sono Campi, trans. Giorgia Pordenoni, Oedipus Edizioni). Silverman's poems are also featured in the premier anthology of contemporary American poetry, The Best American Poetry (2016, 2017). Her poetry focuses on intimacy and loss, and is characterized by a style of strong narrative and deep but fragmented lyricism.

Silverman is considered one of the most innovative contemporary English translators of Italian poetry. She is best known for her translations of Giovanni Pascoli, which have appeared in The Nation, New England Review, Agni, Pleiades and Modern Poetry in Translation. This work culminated in the publication of Selected Poems of Giovanni Pascoli by Princeton University Press, which Jonathan Galassi calls "a lyrical and learned introduction to one of modern Italy's essential poets," and which was shortlisted for the John Florio Prize in 2021. Silverman has also translated Pier Paolo Pasolini's dialect poetry and poems by Paolo Valesio.

She has taught at the University of Bologna in Italy under a Fulbright fellowship, Ursinus College, and Emory University, where she also served as the creative writing fellow. Silverman has also served as a teaching fellow at the University of Maryland and University of Houston. Previously, she worked as a poetry instructor in public schools through the Writers-in-the-Schools program.

== Awards and recognition ==
- W.K. Rose Fellowship
- Emory University Poetry Fellowship
- Fulbright Research Scholarship (2010-2011)
- MacDowell Colony Residence
- Virginia Center for Creative Arts Residence
- Academy of American Poets - Anais Nin Award
- Anne Halley Prize for Poetry (2016)
