= Barga–Gallicano railway station =

Railway station in Tuscany, Italy

Barga–Gallicano
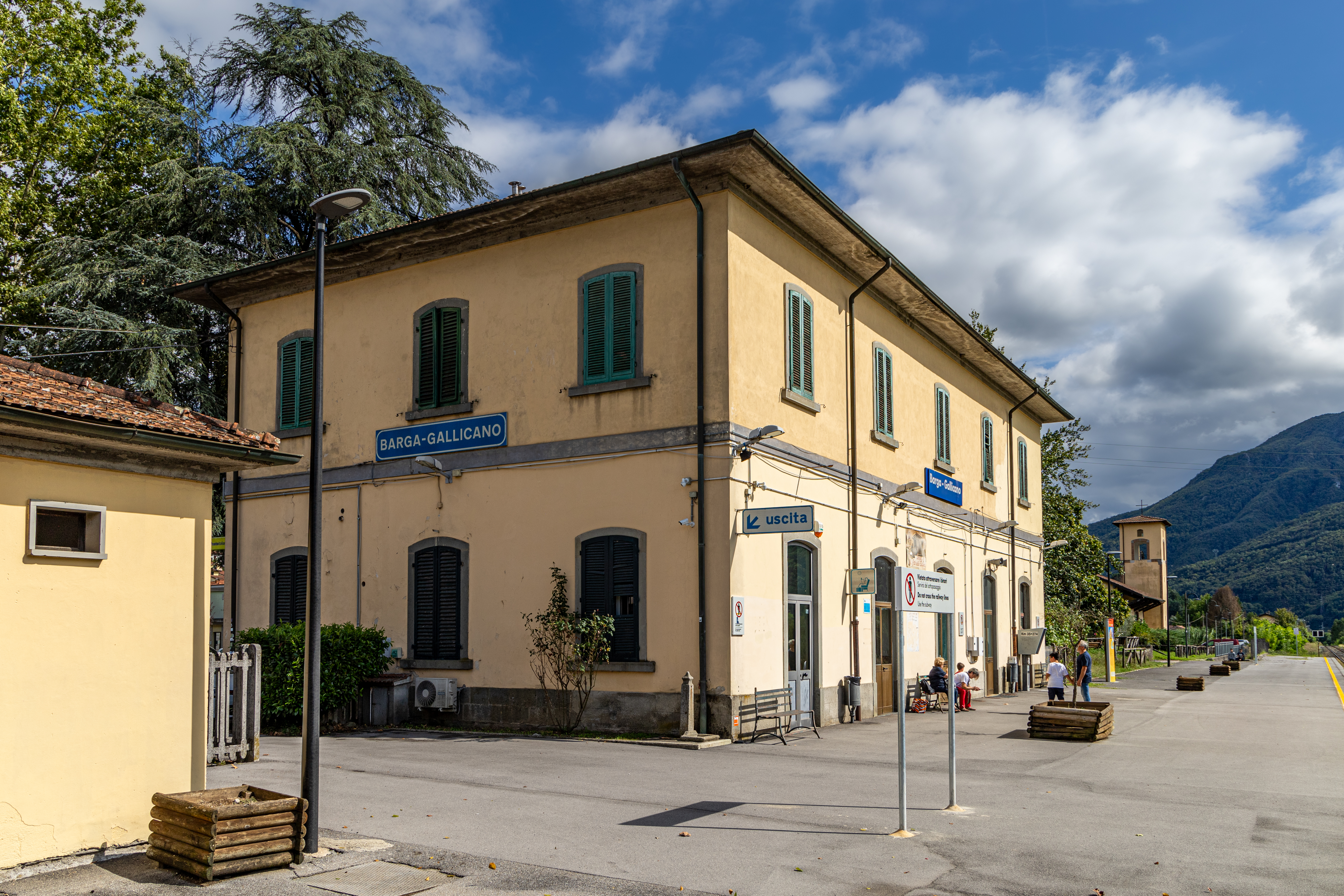
- Barga–Gallicano's passenger building

General information
- Location: Barga, Province of Lucca, Tuscany; Italy
- Coordinates: 44°4′5.2″N 10°27′7.64″E
- Operator: Rete Ferroviaria Italiana
- Line: Lucca–Aulla
- Platforms: 1
- Tracks: 1
- Train operators: Trenitalia
- Connections: Local buses

Other information
- Classification: Bronze

History
- Opened: 27 July 1911; 115 years ago

Services
Fornaci di Barga railway station	Lucca–Aulla	Castelvecchio Pascoli railway station
Location
- Location within Tuscany Location within Italy

Barga–Gallicano railway station (Italian: Stazione di Barga–Gallicano) is a railway station located in the Tuscany region of central Italy serving the comunes of Barga and Gallicano. The station is situated roughly midway between the two towns from which it takes its name, in the Mologno frazione of Barga, on the east bank of the Serchio river.

Barga–Gallicano forms part of the Lucca–Aulla railway. The station is served exclusively by regional trains operated by Trenitalia, whilst the station itself is managed by Rete Ferroviaria Italiana (RFI), both of which are subsidiaries of Italy's state-owned rail company Ferrovie dello Stato (FS).

== History ==
The station was opened in 1911 with citizens of both local towns present to celebrate the arrival of a FS Class 290 locomotive operating the first service of the morning.

When it was opened, access to the station from Gallicano relied on a boat crossing over the Serchio. A bridge connecting the town to the station was built 12 years later, in 1923.

A former railway goods warehouse situated adjacent to the station platform was converted into local church Chiesa di Mologno with the addition of a small bell tower.

== Gallery ==
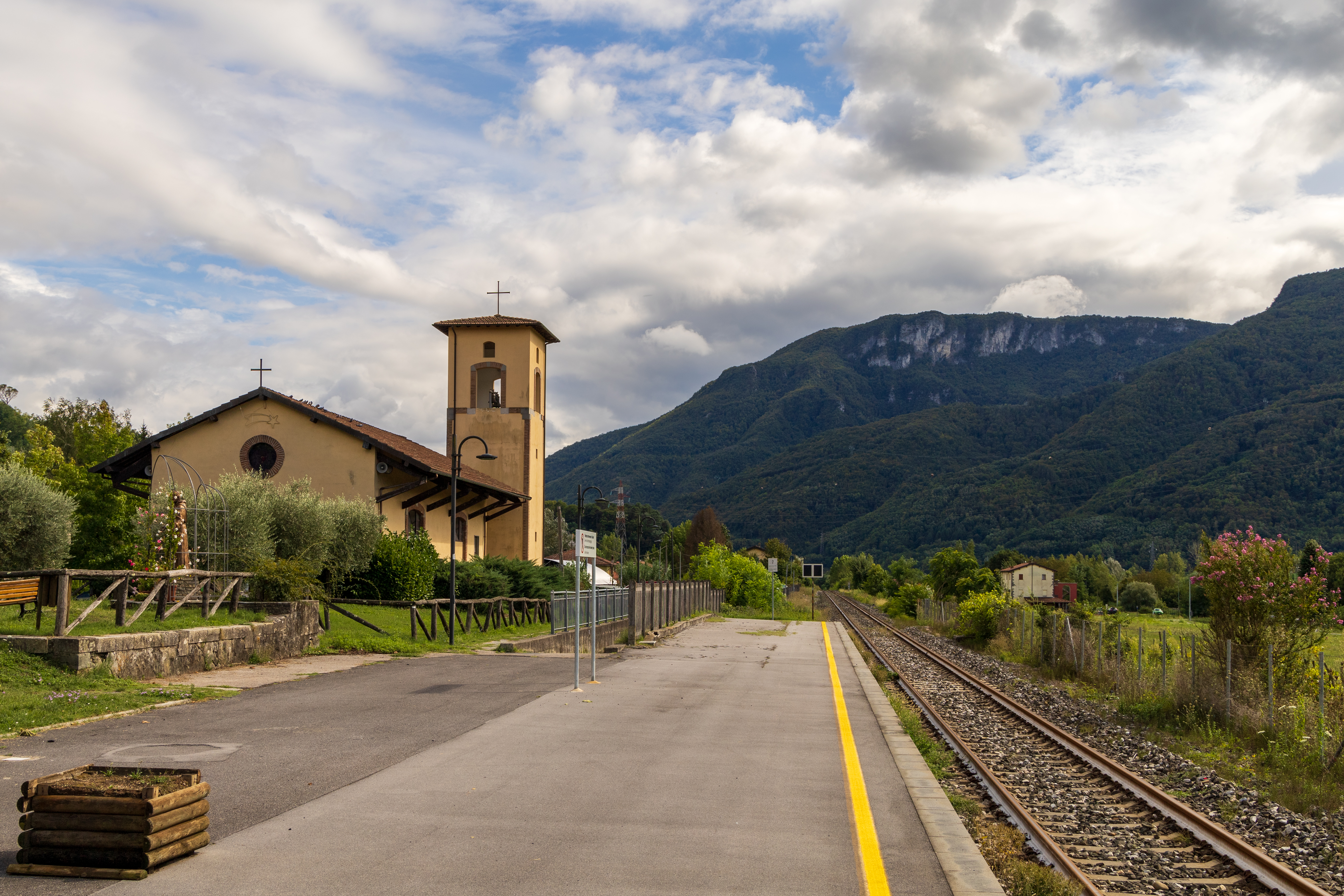
Platform & Chiesa di Mologno

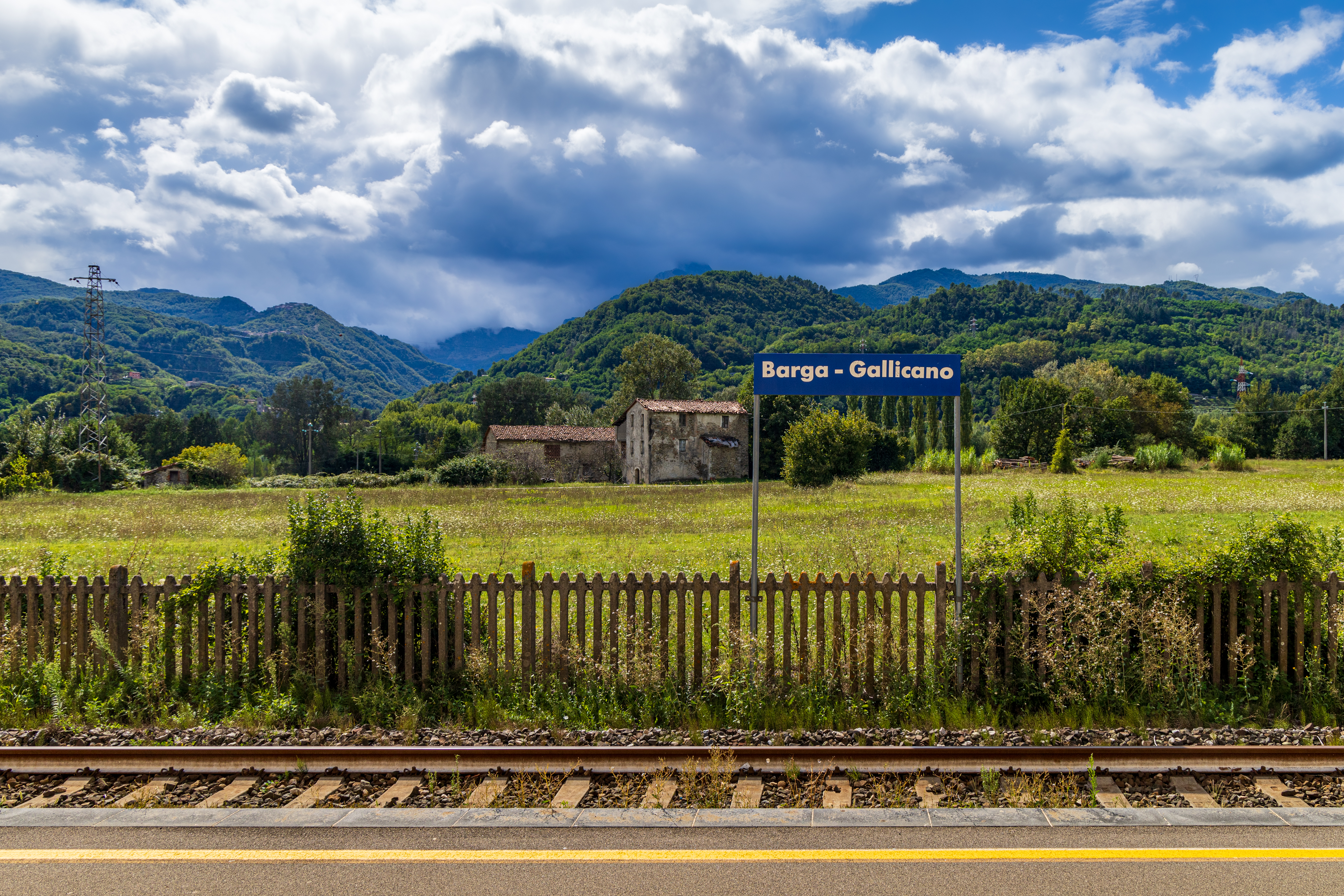
Station sign

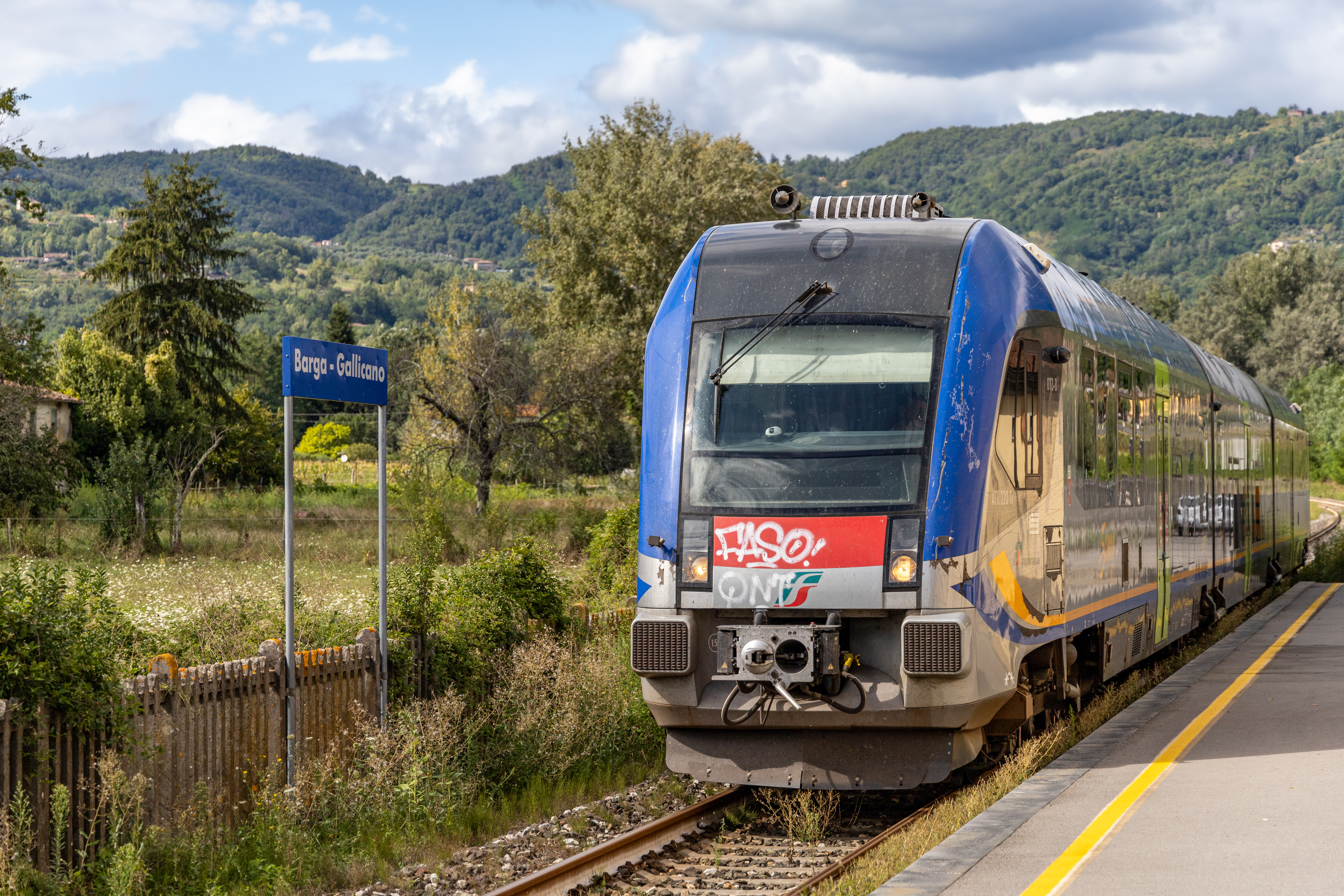
Approaching train
