= Castelvecchio Pascoli =

- Frazione
- Location of Castelvecchio Pascoli in Italy
- Coordinates: 44°05′57″N 10°27′48″E
- Country: Italy
- Region: Tuscany
- Province: Lucca (LU)
- Comune: Barga
- Elevation: 286 m (938 ft)
- Time zone: UTC+1 (CET)
  - Summer (DST): UTC+2 (CEST)
- Postal code: 55051
- Dialing code: 0583

Castelvecchio di Barga, officially Castelvecchio Pascoli, is a village in Tuscany in central Italy. Administratively, it is a frazione of the comune of Barga, in the province of Lucca, in the Serchio Valley, where poet Giovanni Pascoli bought the house "Cardosi-Carrara".

== History ==
Giovanni Pascoli spent much of his time in Castelvecchio, dedicating himself to poetry and studies in classical literature. His former house, now in use as the Pascoli House-Museum ("Pascoli House-Museum"), has three desks where he worked in Latin, Greek and Italian. Here he seemed to have finally rebuilt the "nest" – his family's traditional residence; the original in San Mauro was destroyed.

The Casa museo Pascoli is still visited today. Giovanni Pascoli and his sister Mariù are buried in the adjacent chapel.

== Sports ==
The sports company "Il Ciocco" hosted, in 1991, the second edition of the UCI Mountain Bike World Championships.
