= San Mauro Pascoli =

- Comune
- Comune di San Mauro Pascoli
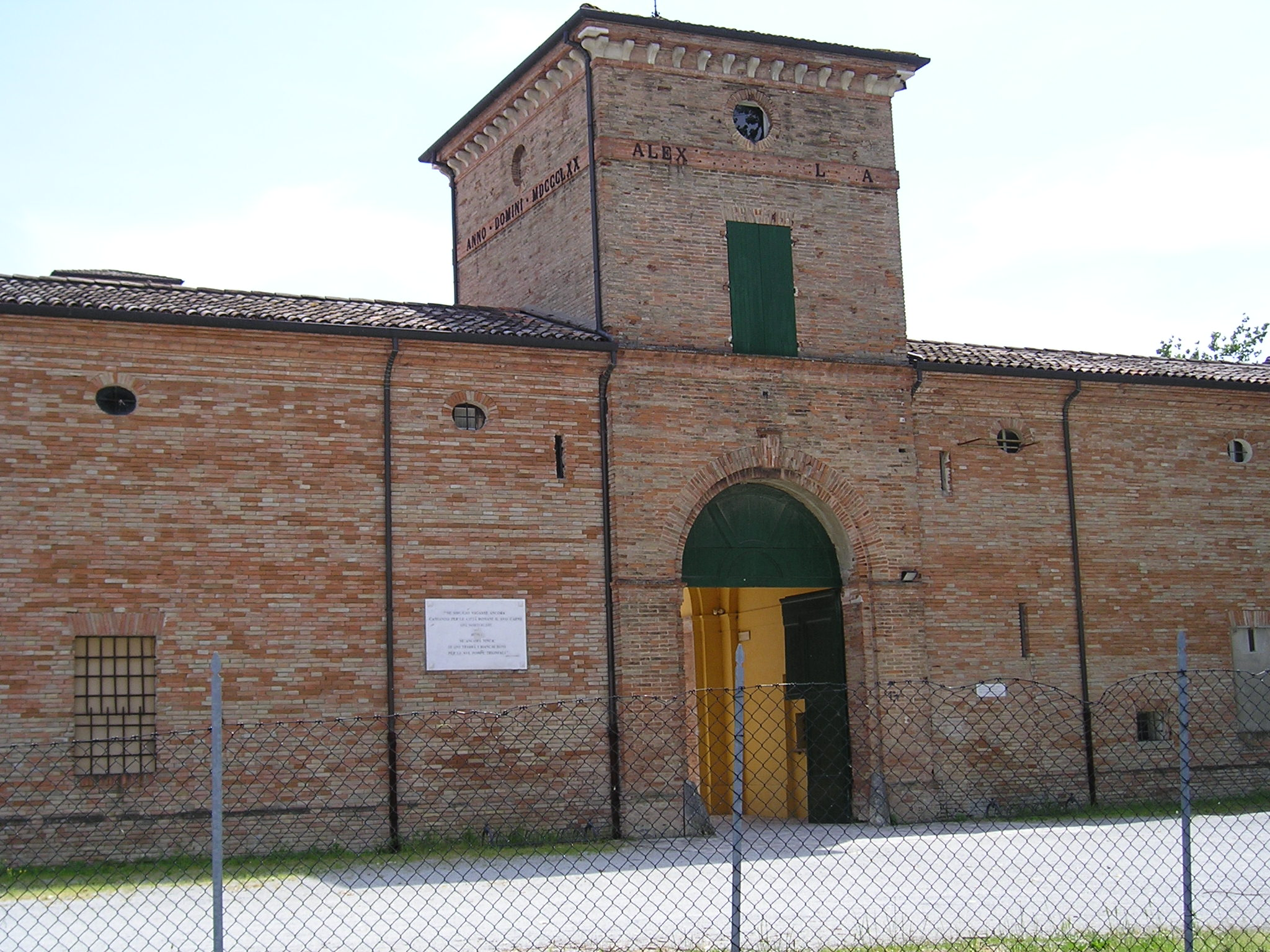
- Villa Torlonia.

- Location within Italy Location within Emilia-Romagna
- Coordinates: 44°6′N 12°25′E
- Country: Italy
- Region: Emilia-Romagna
- Province: Province of Forlì-Cesena (FC)
- Frazioni: Alberazzo, La Torre, San Mauro Mare

Government
  - Mayor: Luciana Garbuglia

Area
  - Total: 17.29 km^{2} (6.68 sq mi)
- Elevation: 27 m (89 ft)

Population (31 December 2017)
  - Total: 11,929
  - Density: 689.9/km^{2} (1,787/sq mi)
- Demonym: Sammauresi
- Time zone: UTC+1 (CET)
  - Summer (DST): UTC+2 (CEST)
- Postal code: 47030
- Dialing code: 0541
- Patron saint: St. Crispin
- Saint day: 25 October
- Website: Official website

San Mauro Pascoli (Romagnol: San Mevar) is a comune (municipality) in the Province of Forlì-Cesena in the Italian region Emilia-Romagna, located about 100 kilometres (62 mi) southeast of Bologna and about 35 kilometres (22 mi) southeast of Forlì. It is at some 7.5 kilometres (4.7 mi) from the sea, the frazione of San Mauro Mare facing it.

The comune was called San Mauro di Romagna until 1932, when its name was changed in honor of the poet Giovanni Pascoli and his beloved sister Maria, who were born here. Famous Italian shoe designers Giuseppe Zanotti and Sergio Rossi were also born there. The commune contains the hamlet of San Mauro Mare.

== Main sights ==
- Torlonia tower
- Roman furnaces
- Giovanni Pascoli House

== Twin towns ==
- Moena, Italy
- Teggiano, Italy, since 1971
- Cluj-Napoca, Romania, since 1996
- Naumburg, Germany, since 2001
- Pinsk, Belarus, since 2002
