= Giovanni Pascoli =

Italian poet and classical scholar (1855–1912)

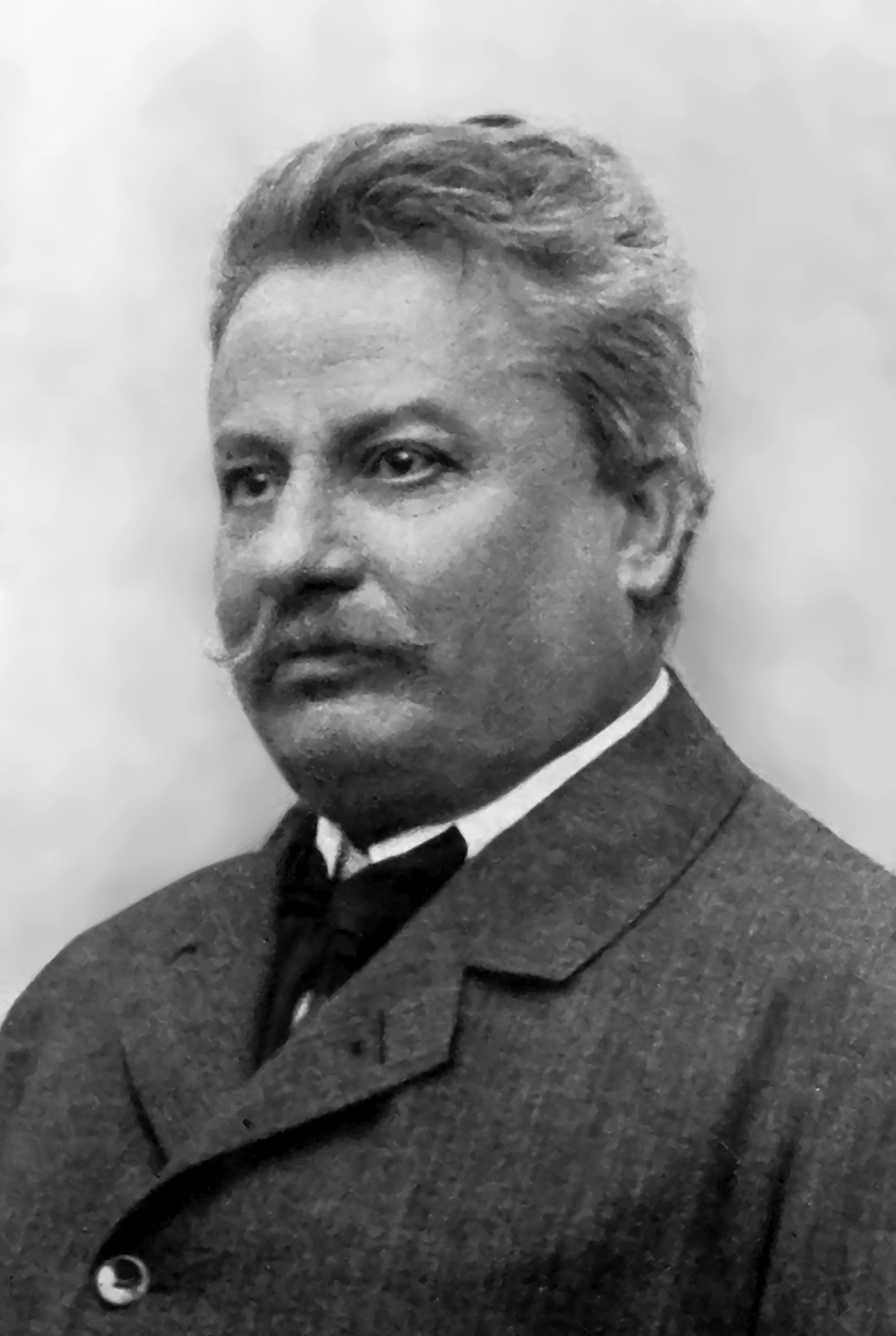
- Born: 31 December 1855; San Mauro Pascoli, Papal States
- Died: 6 April 1912 (aged 56); Bologna, Italy
- Resting place: Castelvecchio di Barga
- Occupations: Poet, scholar.
- Writing career
- Movements: Symbolism, Decadentism

Signature
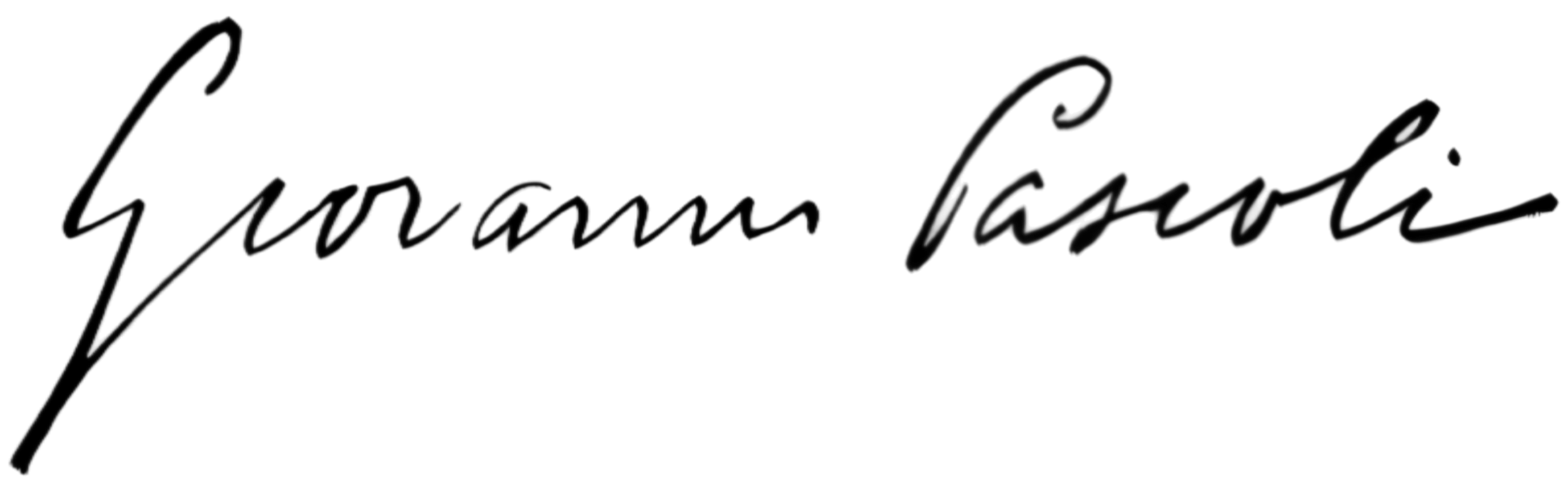

Giovanni Placido Agostino Pascoli (Italian: [dʒoˈvanni ˈpaskoli]; 31 December 1855 – 6 April 1912) was an Italian poet, classical scholar and an emblematic figure of Italian literature in the late nineteenth century. Alongside Gabriele D'Annunzio, he was one of the greatest Italian decadent poets.

The first publication of "Il Fanciullino" in 1897 reveals an intimate and introspective understanding of poetic sentiment. It emphasizes the importance of the particular and the everyday, while also evoking a childlike, almost primal dimension. According to Pascoli, only the poet can articulate the 'childishness' inherent in everyone. This notion enables him to assume the somewhat anachronistic role of a poet-vate and to reaffirm poetry's moral (particularly its consolatory) and civic value.

Although he did not actively participate in any literary movement of the time nor show any particular inclination towards contemporary European poetry (unlike Gabriele D'Annunzio), he manifested predominantly spiritualistic and symbolistic tendencies in his production, typical of the decadentist culture of the end of the century, marked by the progressive fading away of positivism.

Overall, his work is characterized by a constant tension between the classical tradition inherited from his teacher, Giosuè Carducci, and emerging decadent themes. Understanding the true meaning of his most significant works is challenging without considering the painful and tormented biographical and psychological elements he obsessively restructured throughout his life, forming the foundational semantic system of his poetic and artistic world.

== Biography ==
Giovanni Pascoli was born at San Mauro di Romagna in 1855. In 1867, when Giovanni Pascoli was 12, his father Ruggero Pascoli was shot and killed by an assassin hiding in a ditch by the road. Ruggero Pascoli was returning home from the market at Cesena in a carriage drawn by a black-and-white mare (cavalla storna). The mare continued slowly on her way and brought home the body of her slain master. The murderer was never apprehended.

Giovanni Pascoli had a tragic childhood, struck by the murder of his father and the early deaths of his mother, sister and two brothers and the subsequent financial decline of the family. The father's assassination echoes in particular in one of his most popular poems, "La cavalla storna". His whole first work, Myricae (1891), reflects his unhappy childhood.

In 1871, he moved to Rimini with six of his brothers, where he made friends with Andrea Costa, and began to participate in Socialist demonstrations. This led to another key event in Pascoli's life, his brief imprisonment in Bologna after a protest against the capture of the anarchist Giovanni Passannante, who attempted to kill King Humbert I. Pascoli composed an Ode to Passannante, which he tore up soon after reading it during a socialist gathering in Bologna.

Pascoli studied at the University of Bologna, where his teacher and mentor was Giosuè Carducci. In 1882 he was initiated at the Masonic lodge "Rizzoli" of Bologna. A few months later, he graduated, and began to teach in high schools in Matera and Massa. He lived next to his sisters Ida and Maria, in an attempt to renew the original family, building a "nest" (as he called it) for the sisters and himself. Although he was almost married, it is speculated that he never did so because of an immature and perhaps ambiguous relationship with his sisters.

In the same year, Pascoli dedicated a literary work to the memory of the Freemason Giuseppe Garibaldi, a leading figure of the Italian Risorgimento movement, as well as to Giosuè Carducci, his beloved teacher and close friend.

In the meantime he began to collaborate with the magazine Vita nuova, which published his first poems later collected in Myricae. In 1894 Pascoli was called to Rome to work for the Ministry of Public Instruction, and there he published the first version of Poemi conviviali. Later, he moved between cities and lived in Bologna, Florence and Messina, but remained always psychologically rooted to his original idealised peasant origins.

In 1895 he and his sister Maria moved into a house at Castelvecchio, near Barga, in Tuscany, bought with money gained from literary awards. The political and social turmoil of the early 20th century, which was to lead to Italy's participation in World War I and to the advent of fascism, further strengthened Pascoli's insecurity and pessimism.

From 1897 to 1903, he taught Latin at the University of Messina and then in Pisa. When Carducci retired, Pascoli replaced him as professor of Italian literature at the University of Bologna. In 1912, already ill of cirrhosis (from alcohol abuse), Giovanni Pascoli died of liver cancer at the age of 56 in Bologna. An atheist, he was entombed in the chapel annexed to his house at Castelvecchio, where his beloved sister, Maria, would also be laid to rest.

In 2002, a curator discovered Pascoli's autographed Masonic will, in the shape of a triangle, the triangle being a Masonic symbol.

== Poetics ==
Although he was not an active participant in any literary movement of the time, nor showed any particular propensity towards contemporary European poetry (as opposed to D'Annunzio), he manifests in his works mainly spiritualistic and idealistic tendencies, typical of late nineteenth-century culture marked by the progressive exhaustion of Positivism.

Overall his work appears to be followed by a constant tension between the old classicist tradition inherited from his teacher Giosuè Carducci, and the new themes of decadentism.

His poems center on domestic life and nature. However, even in that period of Positivism and scientism, Pascoli believed that life is a mystery; only symbolic associations discovered in the humble things of nature can lead man to catch a glimpse of the truth behind mere appearances. A core aspect of Pascoli's poetry at this time was his imagistic focus on small things ("piccole cose"). Pascoli abandoned the previous era's grandiose language and rhetoric, including that of his mentor Giosuè Carducci, for poetry that was simple and inspired by day-to-day life and objects. The title of his first collection 'Myricae' draws attention to this approach; it is widely regarded as a reference to Virgil's 'humilesque myricae', i.e. humble tamarisks. "Orchards and humble tamarisks don't please everyone" from Eclogues, IV. The Golden Age, Virgil.

Pascoli's later poems share similar themes but are more experimental, and reflect his knowledge of classical antiquity. They were a great influence on later Italian poets, who incorporated his melancholy themes into their own works. He wrote in both Italian and Latin; he also translated English poetry. His numerous poems in Latin gained many international awards.

In 1897 Pascoli issued a detailed definition of his poetical stance, which he called poetica del fanciullino ("poetics of the child") and which showed the influence of Sully and von Hartmann. Poetry, according to Pascoli, would be the unceasing capability to get stunned by the world, typical of childhood, secondarily connected to the expressive capabilities of the aged. In a refusal of both Classicism and Romanticism, Pascoli opposed both the renunciation of self-analysis and the abandonment of the self-centered point of view, in favour of a semi-irrational comfort which the poet gives himself through poetry.

Pascoli's poetry shows interesting affinities with European symbolism, even if direct influences cannot be demonstrated. A wide use of analogy and synesthesia, a very subtle musicality, a lexicon open both to foreign languages and to vernacular or onomatopeic voices are major signs of a literary research oriented towards modern poetical language.

Pascoli was also known as a prose essayist and for his Dante studies. According to the Grand Orient of Italy, Pascoli was initiated in the Fremasonry by the Scottish Rite Grand Master Giosuè Carducci.

=== Poetry as a 'nest' that protects from the world ===
For Pascoli, poetry has an irrational nature and through it one can arrive at the truth of everything; the poet must be a poet-child who arrives at this truth through irrationality and intuition. He therefore rejects reason and, consequently, rejects Positivism, which was the exaltation of reason itself and of progress, thus arriving at decadentism. Poetry thus becomes analogical, i.e. without any apparent connection between two or more realities that are represented; but in reality a connection, sometimes even a somewhat forced one, is present between the concepts, and the poet is often forced into dizzying flights to connect these concepts. Irrational or analogical poetry is a poetry of unveiling or discovery and not of invention. The main motifs of this poetry must be 'humble things': things of everyday life, modest or familiar things. Added to this is the obsessive memory of his dead, whose presences continually hover in the 'nest', re-proposing the past of mourning and pain and inhibiting the poet from any relationship with external reality, any life of relationships, which is felt as a betrayal of the dark, visceral bonds of the 'nest'. The 'nest' is a symbol of family and affection, a refuge from the violence of the world and history.

== Legacy ==
On 21 September 1924, Pascoli was honoured in the first visit of Benito Mussolini to Rimini as Italy's fascist dictator. The celebration, in Rimini's recently-restored Palazzo dell'Arengo, was attended by senior cultural figures and representatives of the Italian and Sammarinese governments, including Alfredo Panzini, Aldo Oviglio, and Giuliano Gozi. Addressing crowds assembled in Piazza Cavour from the balcony of the city hall, Mussolini said:

[Pascoli is] one of the greatest poets in the history of our lineage, one of the few great poets who have managed to draw all the accents from all the strings, who spoke a word 'materialised' with deep truth, this: that Italy, the great proletarian, is a country both old and young at the same time, poor and rich, great in its past and because we want it, even greater in its future.

— Benito Mussolini, Speech in Rimini's Piazza Cavour, 21 September 1924

The Nobel Laureate Seamus Heaney first encountered Pascoli's work in 2001 on a visit to Urbino. Heaney later translated and reworked Pascoli's 'L'aquilone' ('The Kite') which was published in 2009. Heaney went on to publish his translation of 'L'ultima passeggiata' (The Last Walk) which was published after his death in 2013 in a limited edition.

Volumes of Pascoli's work in English include Last Voyage: Selected Poems of Giovanni Pascoli, translated by Richard Jackson, Deborah Brown, and Susan Thomas (Red Hen Press, 2010); Selected Poems of Giovanni Pascoli, translated by Taije Silverman and Marina Della Putta Johnston (Princeton University Press, 2019); Last Dream, translated by Geoffrey Brock (World Poetry Books, 2019); Convivial Poems, translated by Elena Borelli and James Ackhurst (Italica Press, 2022); Tamarisks, translated by Piero Garofalo (Italica Press, 2024). Last Dream was awarded the 2020 Raiziss/de Palchi Book Prize from the Academy of American Poets.

== Works ==
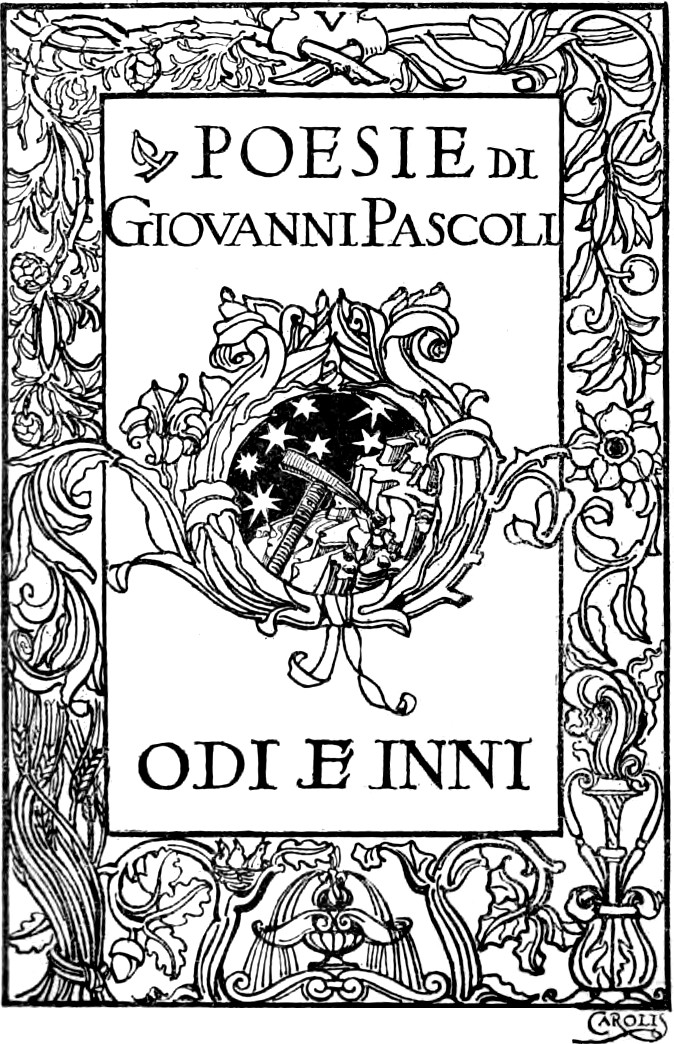
Italian poetry book: Odi e inni, 1906

- Myricae (1891), published in a dual-language edition, translated by Piero Garofalo, entitled Tamarisks (Italica Press, 2024)
- Lyra romana (1895)
- Il fanciullino (1897)
- Pensieri sull'arte poetica (1897)
- Epos (1897)
- Poemetti (1897)
- Minerva oscura (1898) ["Dark Minerva: Prolegomena: The Moral Construction of Dante's Divine Comedy," translated by Richard Robinson into English, published by Sunny Lou Publishing, ISBN 978-1-95539-235-8, 2022]
- Intorno alla Minerva oscura (1899)
- Sotto il velame (1900)
- Sul limitare (1900)
- Fior da fiore (1901)
- La mirabile visione (1902)
- Canti di Castelvecchio (1903)
- Primi poemetti (1904)
- Poemi conviviali (1904), published in a dual-language edition, translated by Elena Borelli and James Ackhurst, entitled Convivial Poems (Italica Press, 2022)
- Odi e inni (1906)
- Canti di Castelvecchio (Final edition, 1906)
- Pensieri e discorsi (1907)
- Canzoni di re Enzio (1909)
- Nuovi poemetti (1909)
- La grande proletaria si è mossa (1911)
- Poemi italici (1911)
- Poesie varie (1912)
- Poemi del Risorgimento (1913)
