= KME Group =

German copper industry company

KME Logo

The KME Group is a manufacturer of metal products, primarily copper. Their products included rolled copper, copper tubes, bars, and cables.

They are stated to be one of the world's largest copper producers. It was formed from the merging of several copper producers: Kabelmetal AG in Osnabrück (formerly called OKD - Osnabrücker Kupfer und Drahtwerke), Stolberger Metallwerke, Tréfimétaux SA in France, and Europa Metalli.

== History ==
The company began production as the SMI (Societa Metallurgica Italiana) in 1886 in Italy.

In 2018, KME bought German copper product producer Mansfelder Kupfer. The acquisition was investigated by the European Commission.

In 2022, the company completed the purchase of multimetal supplier Aurubis flat rolled products segment (including factorites) across several countries.

In February 2024, the company completed an equity transaction deal aimed at listing its Cunova business unit on the New York Stock Exchange (NYSE).

== Operations ==
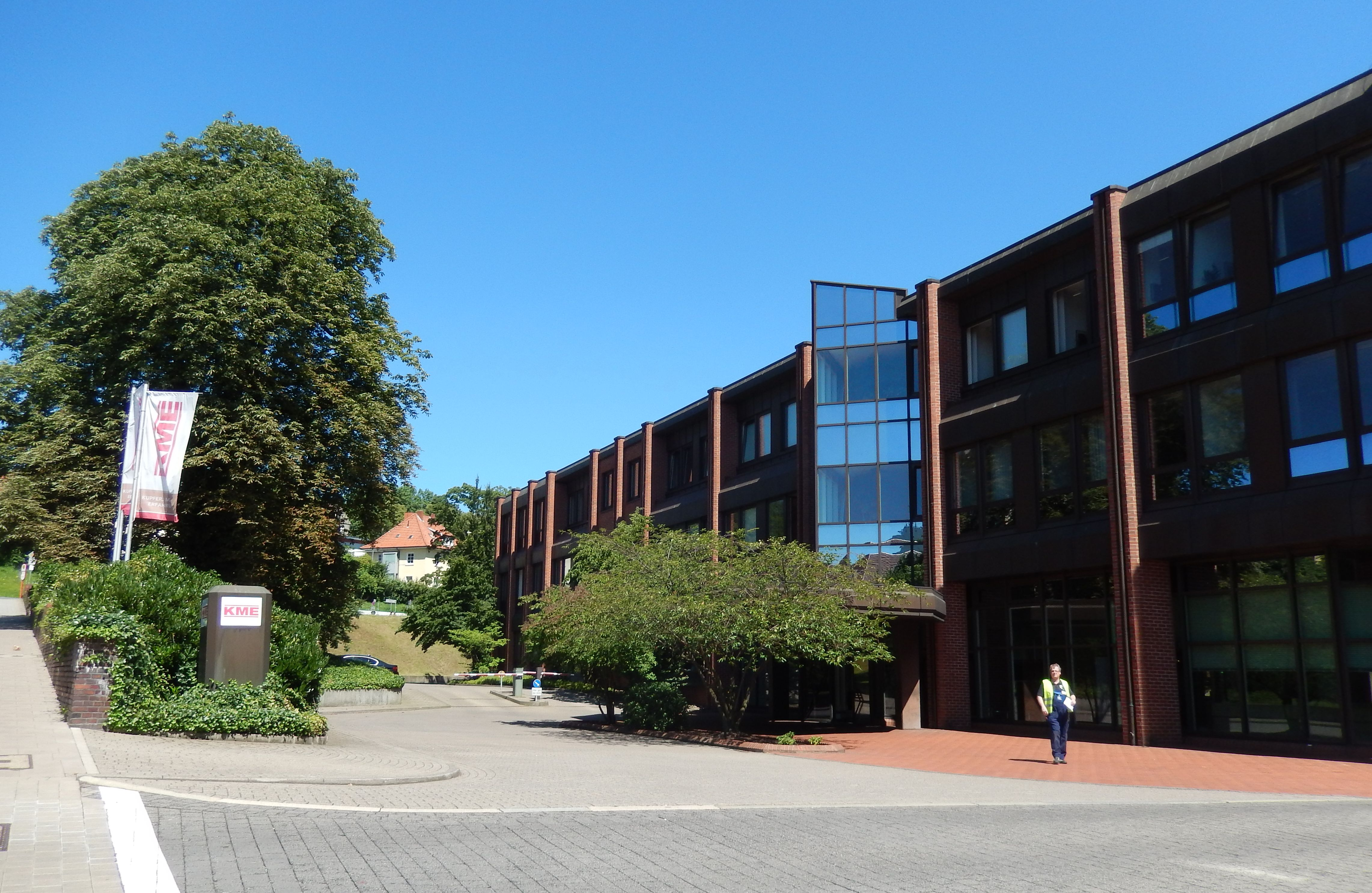
KME office in Osnabrück

The groups corporate business activities primarily take place in Italy.

The company had sales of €1.9bn in 2023, producing around 200,000 metric tons of copper.

In 2025 it was reported as employing around 3,400 people and operating eight production facilities spread across Germany, France, Italy, and the Netherlands.
