= Italica Press =

American publishing company

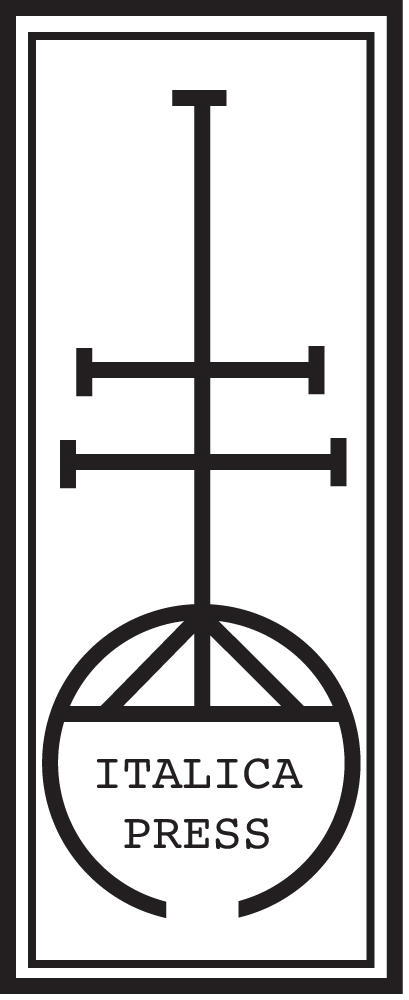
- Founded: 1985
- Founder: Eileen Gardiner and Ronald G. Musto
- Country of origin: United States
- Headquarters location: New York City
- Publication types: Books, E-books
- Official website: www.italicapress.com/index.html

Italica Press was founded in New York in 1985 by Eileen Gardiner and Ronald G. Musto. The press, now in its fourth decade, publishes English translations of works from the Middle Ages and Renaissance and English translations of contemporary Italian literature. It also publishes essays and collected essays in the study of art and history. It specializes in urban studies, medieval pilgrimage, medieval romances and chansons de geste, women writers, fiction, poetry, short stories and plays.

Over the years it has maintained its editorial goal of publishing an average of six titles a year, and its catalog now lists about 130 titles with nearly 400 authors, editors and translators. Italica's list is developed directly from submitted proposals.

Italica has published works by Torquato Tasso, Giovanni Boccaccio, Guido Cavalcanti, Francesco Petrarch, Gaspara Stampa, Grazia Deledda, Luigi Pirandello, Massimo Bontempelli, Aldo Palazzeschi, Vasco Pratolini, Anna Maria Ortese, and Dacia Maraini among many others. Italica also publishes a series of scholarly essays, "Studies in Art & History," with volumes dedicated to scholars such as Aldus Manutius, Paul Oskar Kristeller, Eugene F. Rice, Jr., William S. Heckscher, Irving Lavin, Marilyn Aronberg Lavin and Sarah Blake McHam.

As a small press in the 1980s, Italica was recognized for its innovative approach to publishing, making early use of Macintosh computers and laser printers to produce pages with the look of hot type and other elements of traditional fine printing, while many university and scholarly presses were shooting from camera-ready pages produced on typewriters. In the early days of Italica Press, the only digital fonts available were Courier, Helvetica, Times and Symbol, but slowly a full range of fonts became available. Its first book, The Revolution of Cola di Rienzo, appeared in 1986 complete with one of the first full book indexes generated electronically. Italica's pages were produced physically on a laser printer and then sent for tradition offset printing to one of the several specialized printers then in Ann Arbor, Michigan. Art was produced on Velox paper by photostat machines and traditional methods and pasted onto "flats." In 1992, Italica produced its first book created entirely in Aldus PageMaker; appropriately it was a tribute to the Renaissance scholar and printer Aldus Manutius. It contained dozens of illustrations and a foreword by the president of Aldus Corporation, Paul Brainerd, citing the importance of this Italica Press publication.

In 1993, Italica Press became one of the earliest ebook publishers with its The Marvels of Rome for the Macintosh, which was a HyperCard edition of a medieval pilgrim’s guide to the city, the Mirabilia Urbis Romae. In a 1994 review, Architronic stated: “it is an enjoyable demonstration of the future of HyperCard programming, when interactive layers will make innovative approaches to thinking about texts possible.” By 1995, Italica's tenth anniversary, it was also using personal computers to manage its entire business — from order processing to mailing list management and advertising design. By the 1990s, Italica was producing and sending digital-only files to printers.

By 1995, the press was among the first to use extensively the new technologies of short-run digital printing and print-on-demand. In 2001, it published one of the first digital archival collections on CD-Rom, The Records of the Venetian Senate, 1335-1400. It was edited by Benjamin G. Kohl and included 4,389 archival records. By 2010 it had embraced the possibilities of online publishing with open access titles, maps (for instance for Irish pilgrimage and medieval Naples), image galleries and bibliographies. The 2014 publication of William Tronzo's Petrarch’s Two Gardens: Landscape and the Image of Movement marked the beginning of a new phase of Italica's publication program with the introduction of color art to interior pages. Italica Press has long prided itself on its strong editorial work, the design of its books and the growth of its backlist, where no title ever goes out of print. Almost all its titles are now available as Amazon Kindle ebooks, as well as in print. In summer 2017, many Italica Press titles were selected for online publication through JSTOR.
