= Cerchia dei Navigli =

Moat and canal around medieval Milan, Italy

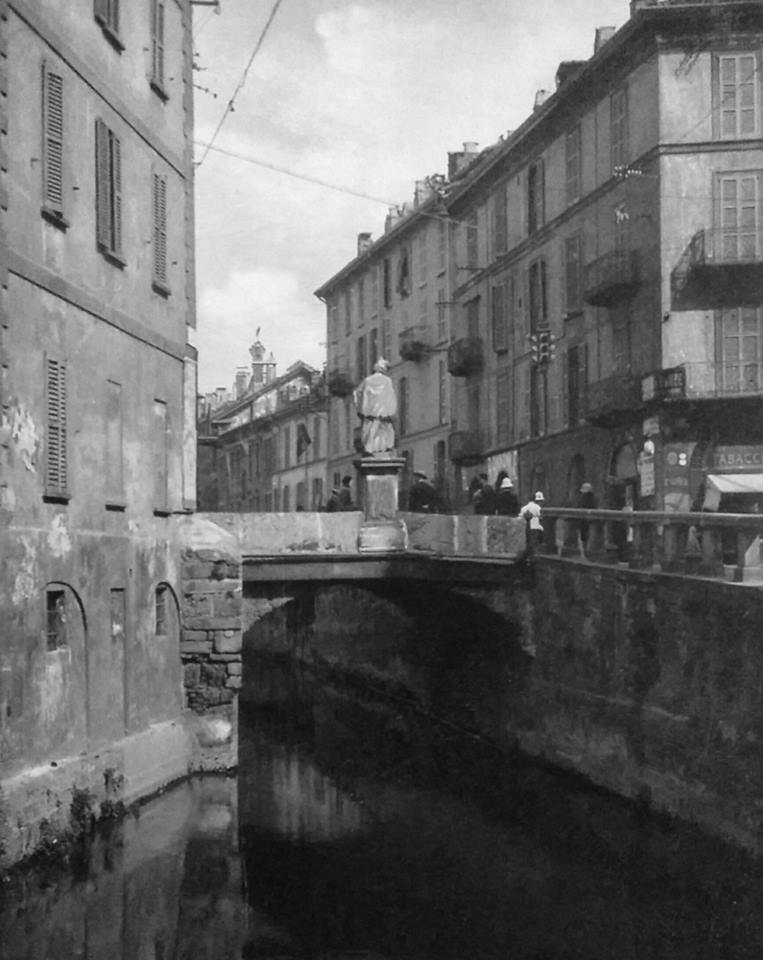
- The Cerchia dei Navigli in via Santa Sofia and the bridge of corso di Porta Romana with the statue of John of Nepomuk in a photograph from the late 1920s

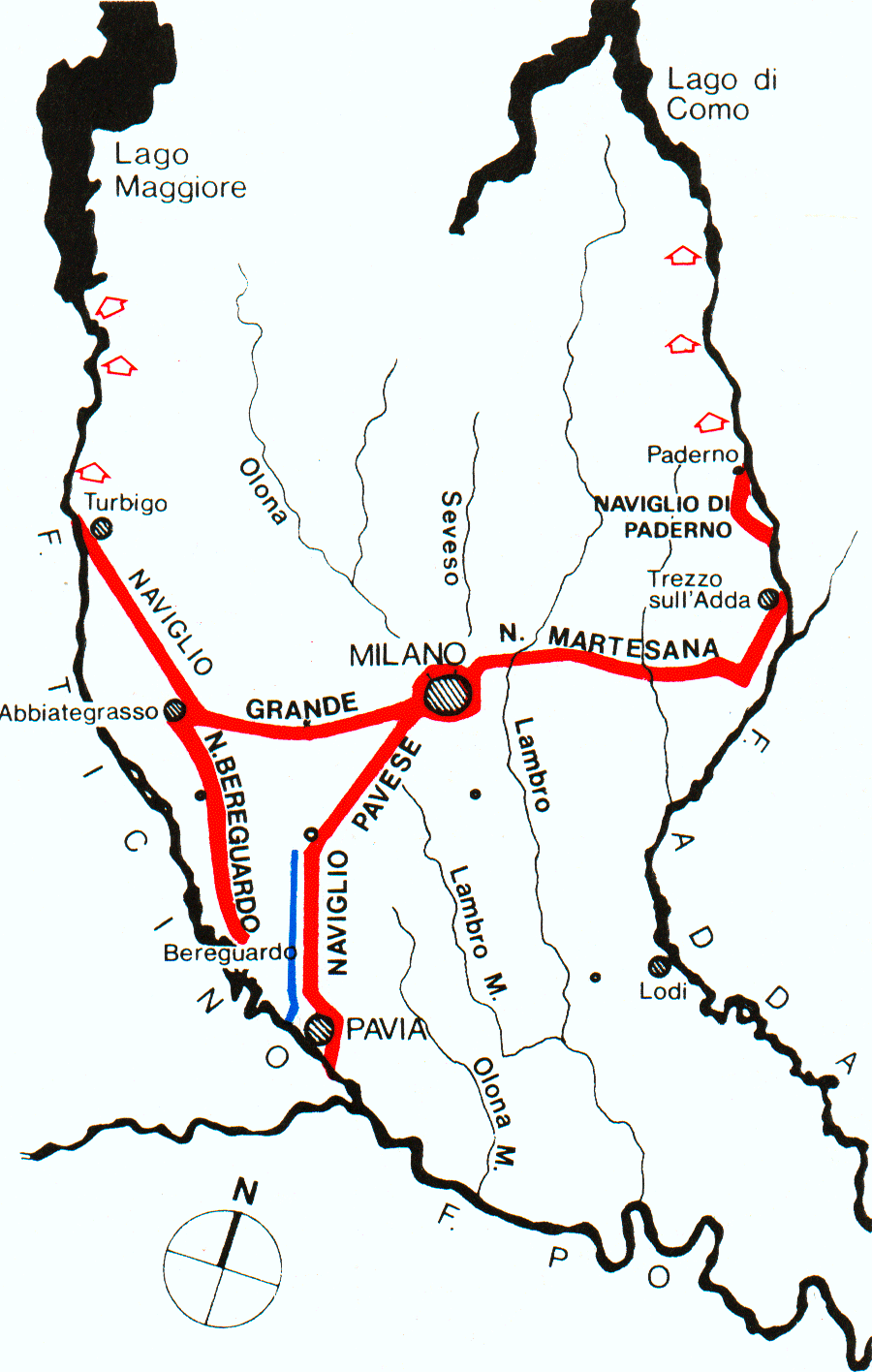

Location
- Country: Italy
- Region: Lombardy

Physical characteristics
- Source: in Milan from the Laghetto di San Marco
  - coordinates: 45.473016°N 9.187912°E
- Mouth: in Milan into the Naviglio Vallone and the Vettabbia
  - coordinates: 45.458573°N 9.178130°E
- Length: 6.5 km (4.0 mi)

Basin features
- Cities: Milan

The Cerchia dei Navigli was the floodable defensive moat of the medieval walls of Milan, with its southeastern part transformed into a Naviglio, or navigable canal. For this reason, it was also known as the Naviglio Interno, Fossa Interna, or Cerchia Interna. Measuring 6.5 km in length and 9 m in width in its navigable section, it was completely filled in accordance with the Piano Beruto, Milan's first urban plan, starting on 16 March 1929, with works concluding the following year. The Cerchia dei Navigli, as a whole, was a ring of water encircling the medieval historic centre of Milan, hence its name.

== Description ==
Constructed as a defensive moat starting in 1156 and transformed into a Naviglio in its southeastern part between 1387 and 1496 through canalization and expansion works commissioned by the Visconti and Sforza families, it served as the hub of the Navigli system of Milan. The only part of the Cerchia dei Navigli that remained a simple, non-navigable moat was the section towards the Sforza Castle, i.e., the northwestern stretch: its function was to supply water to the castle’s moat. The two branches of the Cerchia dei Navigli heading towards the Sforza Castle were called the Naviglio di San Gerolamo (the one descending from the southern vertex of the fortification along via Carducci) and the Naviglio Morto (the one descending from its northern vertex along via Pontaccio).

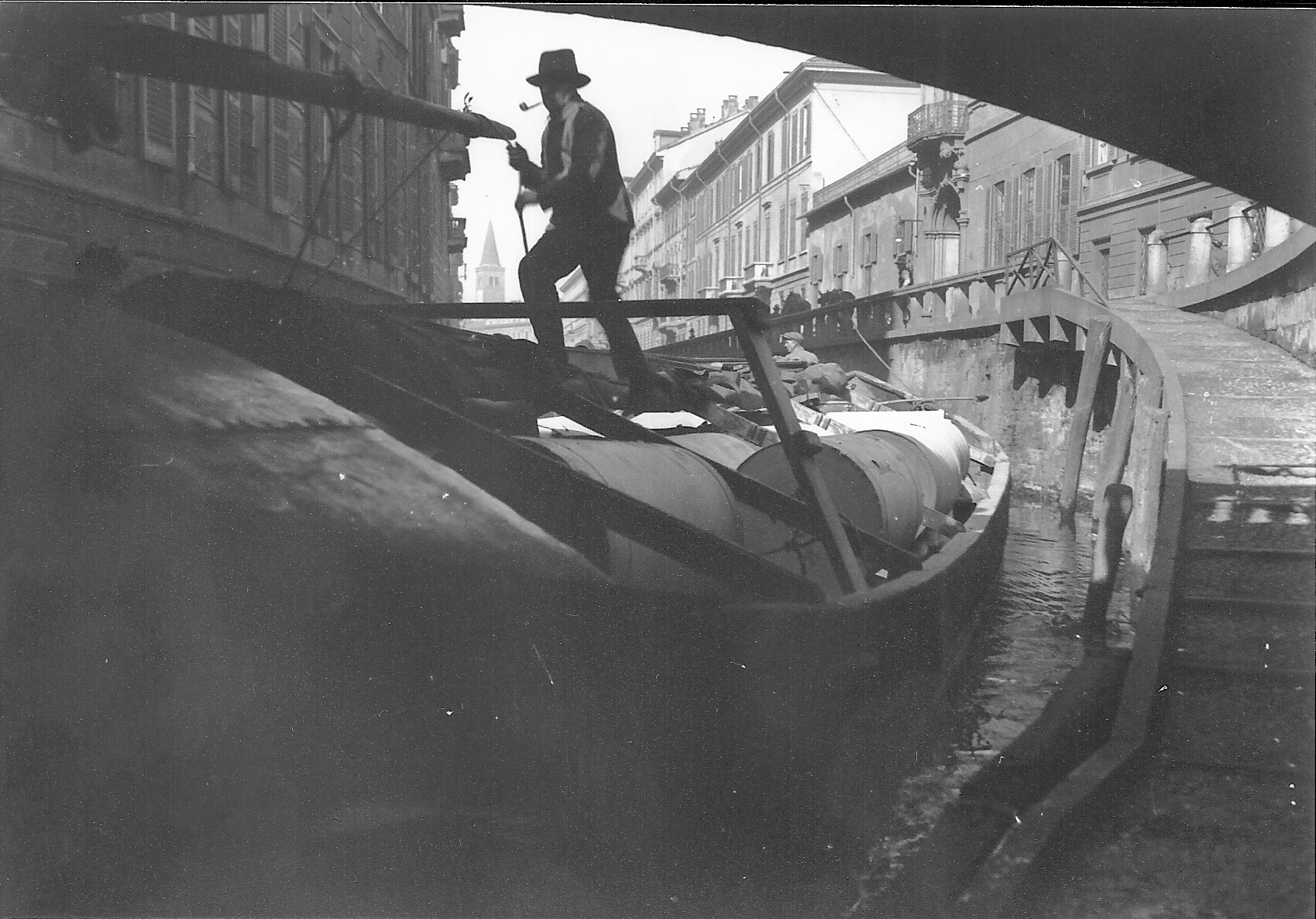
A barge loaded with paper reels for the Corriere della Sera enters via Fatebenefratelli, along the Cerchia dei Navigli

As its inflow, the Cerchia dei Navigli had the Laghetto di San Marco, which originated from the Naviglio di San Marco (i.e., the final stretch of the Naviglio Martesana, which changed its name to Naviglio di San Marco after the Conca dell'Incoronata), while its outflows were the Naviglio Vallone, which then flowed into the Darsena di Porta Ticinese, and a spillway canal that discharged any excess flow from the Cerchia dei Navigli into the Vettabbia Canal. With the filling of the Cerchia dei Navigli, the Naviglio della Martesana was entirely diverted towards the Cavo Redefossi: previously, the latter was merely a spillway canal for the Martesana, as most of its flow went into the Cerchia dei Navigli. The part of the Naviglio della Martesana/Naviglio di San Marco after the Cavo Redefossi, as well as the Naviglio Vallone and the Laghetto di San Marco, were filled in concurrently with the closure works of the Cerchia dei Navigli.

The term "Cerchia dei Navigli" today refers to a ring of roads surrounding the centre of Milan, whose route largely coincides with that of the Naviglio Interno. A project is currently underway aiming to restore the ancient navigable canal (only the southeastern part of the historic Milanese canal) along the Cerchia dei Navigli road network.

== History ==
=== Construction of the moat of the medieval walls in the 12th century ===
The origins of the medieval walls of Milan date back to 1156, when the Lombard city was at war with Frederick Barbarossa. It was Guglielmo da Guintellino, a Genoese military engineer in the service of the Milanese, who designed the works and oversaw their construction.

Guglielmo da Guintellino also created their moat, possibly expanding the ancient Roman refossum, or the second moat of the Roman walls of Milan, which ran further out than the first, skirting the four castles defending Roman Milan. The innermost Roman moat ran alongside the walls.

The Milanese city walls, the republican ones to the south and west and the Maximian extension (286–305) to the north and east (although in many places the city had outgrown them due to urban expansion), were entirely made of masonry. Some significant monuments, especially churches and convents, stood outside them (the Basilica of Sant'Ambrogio, the Basilica of San Lorenzo Maggiore, the Basilica of Sant'Eufemia, the Basilica of San Babila, and the Church of San Bernardino alle Ossa, to name a few), and settlements and activities had developed around them.

The new ring of medieval walls was built, larger in scope, in 1156. It fully protected the city and channeled the waters of the Seveso and the Nirone into its moat. These waters were diverted into the new moat serving the walls, which were twenty-four arms wide; the excavated earth was then used to build large ramparts (also called "terraggi"). Their location coincides with the modern streets of the Cerchia dei Navigli road network.

This defense system was strategically well-placed but not particularly effective, as it was built with earth reinforced by palisades and defended by wooden towers. These were the materials available to Milan, far from stone quarries and lacking elevations for fortified defenses.

Frederick Barbarossa, during the siege of Milan in 1162, seized it and razed the city, dispersing the Milanese to nearby villages and destroying the Roman walls, the only ones made of masonry. In 1171, as a consequence of the 1162 destruction, work began on a more effective defensive system, this time in masonry, equipped with a flooded moat also fed by the waters of the Olona, which until then had been an indirect tributary of the Roman walls’ moat and underwent its second diversion in history on this occasion.

The city had long had a complex water system: it received waters from the Seveso, Acqualunga, Molia, Nirone, Pudiga, and Olona; some entered the city, some surrounded it or exited (the Nirone and the Vettabbia).

Bonvesin de la Riva describes the medieval walls of Milan in his work De magnalibus urbis Mediolani, written in 1288:

A moat of remarkable beauty and width surrounds this city on all sides and contains not a swamp or a putrid pond, but the living water of springs, populated with fish and crayfish. It runs between an inner embankment and a marvelous outer wall.

— Bonvesin de la Riva, De magnalibus urbis Mediolani, 1288 – Pontiggia ed. Bompiani 1974.

The medieval moat, later surpassed militarily, contributed to the city's prosperity, from trade to agriculture, as it was the regulating center of the irrigation system and the many activities made possible by flowing water: mills, fulling mills, presses, hammers, and twisting machines. Some of these activities survived even after the transformation of the ancient defensive moat into a navigable canal, which began at the end of the 14th century. The expansion work required several decades, concluding at the end of the 15th century.

=== Visconti-era expansion and transport of marbles for the Duomo ===
It was Gian Galeazzo Visconti who began major works in 1387 (later continued by Filippo Maria Visconti) to make the ancient moat navigable up to the Laghetto di Santo Stefano, with the goal of transporting by water the marbles and materials essential for the Fabbrica del Duomo to build the Milan Cathedral. Until then, the only vessels navigating Milan's canals were small barges. With the decision to allow barges carrying the Duomo's marble blocks to pass, a problem arose: the draft of these vessels was much greater than that of the small barges that had navigated Milan's canals until then. For this reason, the expansion and dredging of the medieval moat were necessary.

The first works undertaken were the expansion and dredging of the medieval moat from the modern via Molino delle Armi to the Ca' Granda, where, in 1388, the Laghetto di Santo Stefano was created as the docking point for materials destined for the Duomo's construction, located 500 meters from the cathedral's construction site. After these works, the ring of water surrounding the medieval city was called the Cerchia dei Navigli.

These works made it possible to navigate from Lake Maggiore, where the Candoglia marble quarries, used to clad the Duomo, were located, to Milan. Specifically, vessels from Lake Maggiore entered the Ticino River, then the Naviglio Grande, and finally the Laghetto di Sant'Eustorgio, from where materials were transported, with great difficulty, overland to the Cerchia dei Navigli, where they were reloaded onto barges and continued their journey by water to dock at the Laghetto di Santo Stefano.

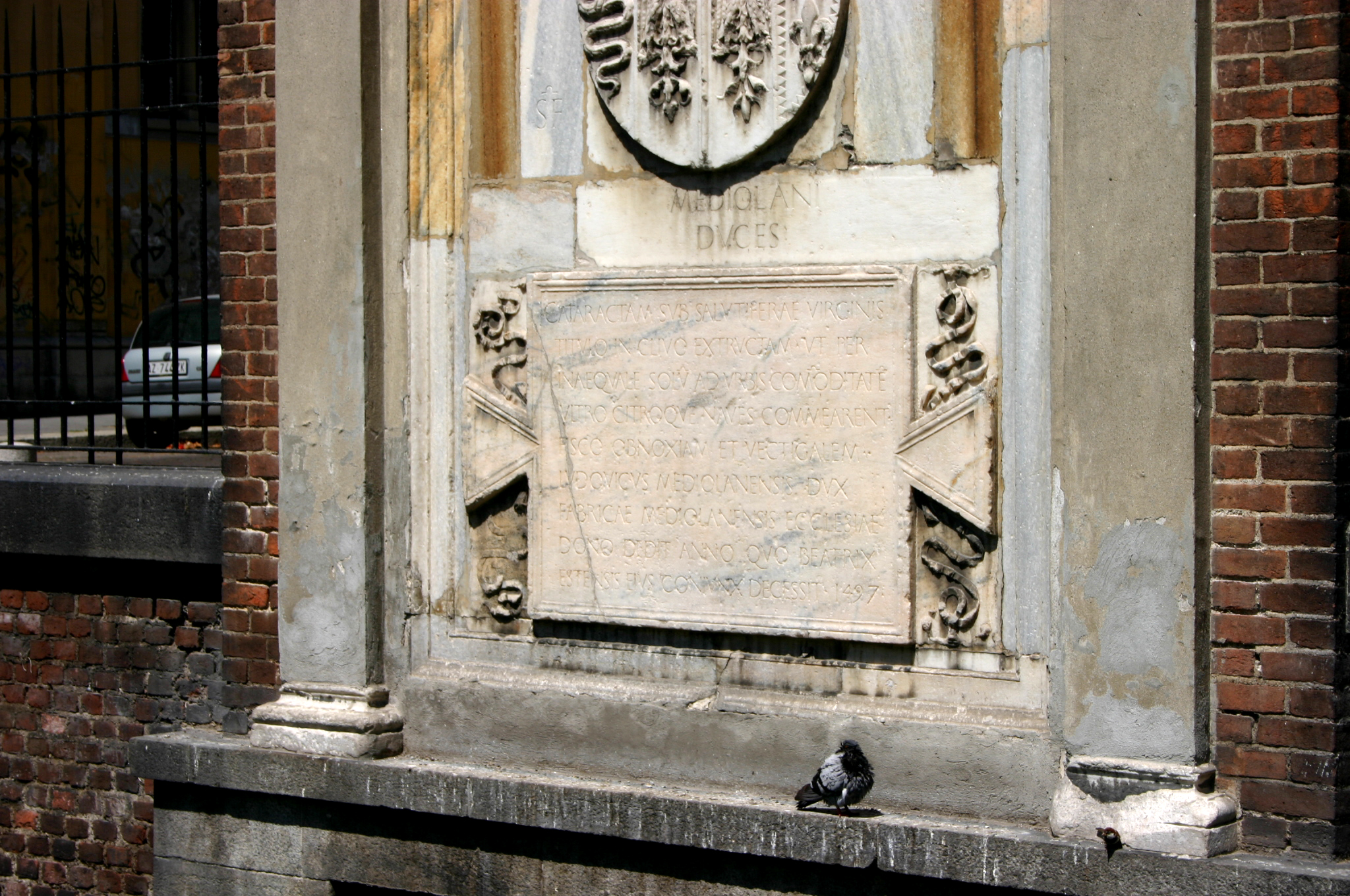
Detail of the ducal decree placed on the shrine at one end of the Conca di Viarenna, guaranteeing exemption from tolls for vessels transporting marbles for the construction of the Milan Cathedral

Regarding the navigation of Milan's Navigli, the construction, between 1438 and 1439, of the Naviglio Vallone, which connected the Laghetto di Sant'Eustorgio to the Cerchia dei Navigli, and the Conca di Viarenna, the first navigation lock built in Europe, was decisive. These eliminated the aforementioned overland transport of marbles from the Laghetto di Sant'Eustorgio to the Cerchia dei Navigli. The construction of the Conca di Viarenna was necessary to overcome the approximately two-meter elevation difference between the Cerchia dei Navigli and the Laghetto di Sant'Eustorgio. Vessels destined for the Duomo's construction site, unlike all others navigating Milan's Navigli, bore the inscription AUF (Lat. Ad usum fabricae, meaning "for the use of the factory," i.e., destined for the Veneranda Fabbrica del Duomo di Milano), which granted exemption from tolls. From "AUF" derives the idiom "a ufo," meaning "free" or "without paying." At one end of the Conca di Viarenna, a shrine, originally located on one of its sides, was reinstalled, bearing the 1497 ducal decree engraved on a Candoglia marble plaque that exempted vessels carrying materials for the Duomo's construction from toll and duty with the formula AUF.

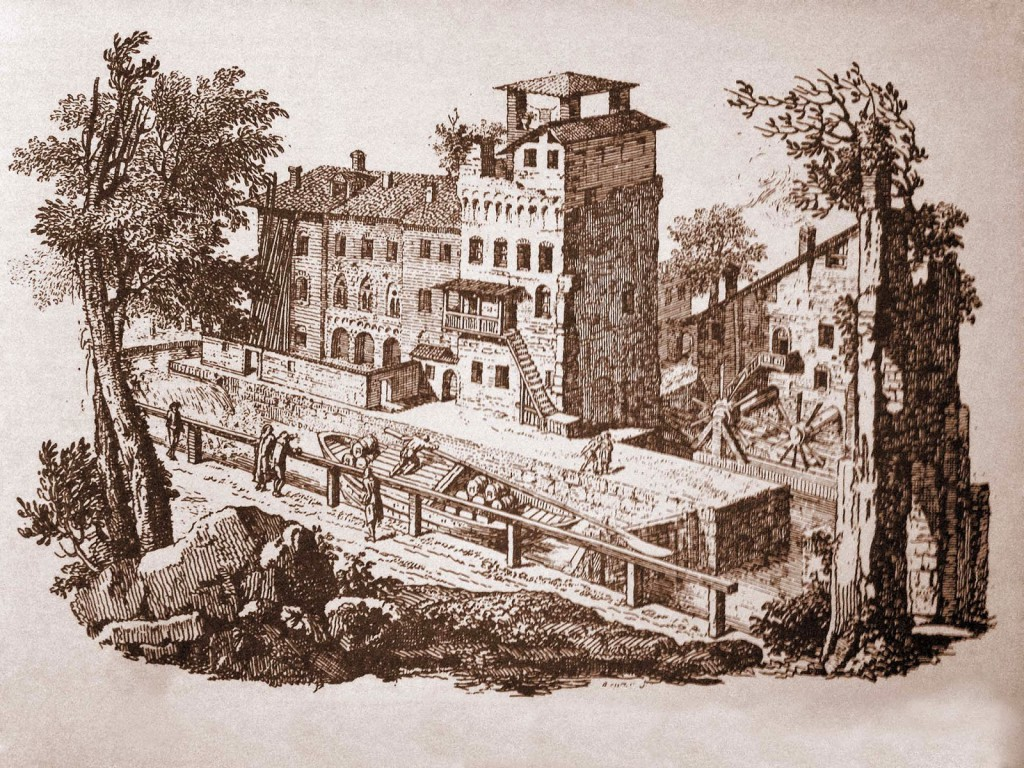
1792 print depicting the Pusterla della Chiusa and the connected building. It was located along the Cerchia dei Navigli at the corner of via Molino delle Armi and via della Chiusa

Legend has it that along the northwestern Cerchia dei Navigli, the Magna, the floating palace of Filippo Maria Visconti, the last duke of this dynasty and younger son of Gian Galeazzo, traveled. The duke moved between the castles of Milan, Abbiategrasso, Cusago, and Pavia only by water, both for state affairs and to visit his many lovers (despite his frail health and a body that barely supported him). Initially, he traveled uncertain routes through ditches and canals descending to the Naviglio Grande, then, from 1445, through the Conca di Sant'Ambrogio, specially built in the current via Carducci (Vercellino branch of the Sforza Castle), and the Conca di Viarenna.

=== Connection with the Martesana in the Sforza era ===
Ludovico il Moro, in 1496, completed the expansion and dredging of the Cerchia dei Navigli to the north, beyond the Laghetto di Santo Stefano, making it navigable also for barges carrying heavy goods; this part of the Cerchia dei Navigli extended to the Laghetto di San Marco, which was connected to the Naviglio di San Marco, the continuation of the Naviglio Martesana downstream of the Conca dell'Incoronata, after which it changed its name. The Laghetto di San Marco, the Naviglio di San Marco, the Naviglio della Martesana, and the Conca delle Gabelle were built earlier, in 1469: with these works, the navigable Cerchia dei Navigli was completed (the innovations introduced by Leonardo da Vinci were crucial for this work). From this moment on, it was possible to navigate uninterruptedly from Lake Maggiore to Lake Como via Milan through the Naviglio della Martesana, a canal originating from the Adda River, which is itself an outflow of Lake Como.

There were also two secondary branches of the Cerchia dei Navigli, never made navigable, connected to the Sforza Castle's moat, completing the water ring around the city to the northwest: one descended from the northern vertex of the fortification via via Pontaccio, rejoining the navigable moat, while the other, the so-called "Vercellino branch" (named after Porta Vercellina, a city gate of Milan along its route), exited from its southern vertex along via Carducci, rejoining the navigable moat at its end.

The part of the Cerchia dei Navigli starting from the modern via Carducci, the so-called Vercellino branch, was also called the Naviglio di San Gerolamo, while the other branch, starting in via Pontaccio, after the filling of the castle's moat in the 17th century due to its diminished military importance, took the name Naviglio Morto, as it reached the fortification without an outlet (similarly, the Naviglio di San Gerolamo was "closed" by the subsequent filling of the castle's moat).

The section of the Cerchia dei Navigli missing to complete the entire navigable ring (i.e., the aforementioned northwestern part, corresponding to the Sforza Castle) had a different history tied to the fortification's events, its moat, and the many transformations it underwent over the centuries. From the north, water descended via via Pontaccio and merged with water from ditches, springs, and sources flowing in the area around the current Arena Civica, encircling the castle and enriched by other sources from the northwest (from the current Musocco district): it exited the castle from the southern vertex and, through the esplanade of the current Piazzale Cadorna, flowed into via Carducci, where it joined the Naviglio di San Gerolamo.

Measuring 6.5 km in length and 9 m in width in its navigable section, the Cerchia dei Navigli had, along its banks, 30 derivation outlets feeding irrigation and milling ditches. Orchards and mills were indeed present along its route. Related to this characteristic, the name of one street of the Cerchia dei Navigli is indicative: via Molino delle Armi.

As its inflow, the Cerchia dei Navigli had the Laghetto di San Marco, which originated from the Naviglio di San Marco (i.e., the final stretch of the Naviglio Martesana, which changed its name to Naviglio di San Marco after the Conca dell'Incoronata), while its outflows were the Naviglio Vallone, which then flowed into the Darsena di Porta Ticinese, and a spillway canal that discharged any excess flow from the Cerchia dei Navigli into the Vettabbia.

The Vettabbia, in particular, originates in the street of the same name from the confluence of the Molino delle Armi canal (running beneath the modern via Santa Croce), the Fugone del Magistrato (running beneath the modern via Vettabbia), and the Vetra canal (running underground beneath the block formed by the two aforementioned streets, in an intermediate position between the mentioned canals).

The Vetra canal, passing under the Piazza Vetra, originated from the Cerchia dei Navigli at the height of Piazza della Resistenza Partigiana and ran eastward through via Gian Giacomo Mora, via Urbano III, and Piazza Vetra, where it joined, as mentioned, the Fugone del Magistrato and the Molino delle Armi canal to form the Vettabbia.

=== Cerchia dei Navigli in the early 20th century ===
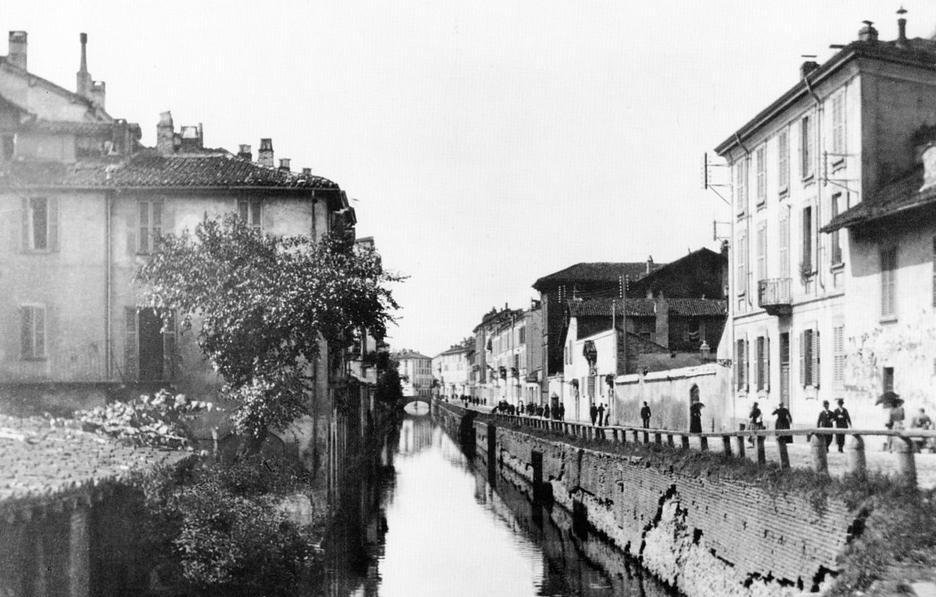
The Naviglio di San Gerolamo, the part of the Cerchia dei Navigli descending from the southern vertex of the Sforza Castle, along via Carducci

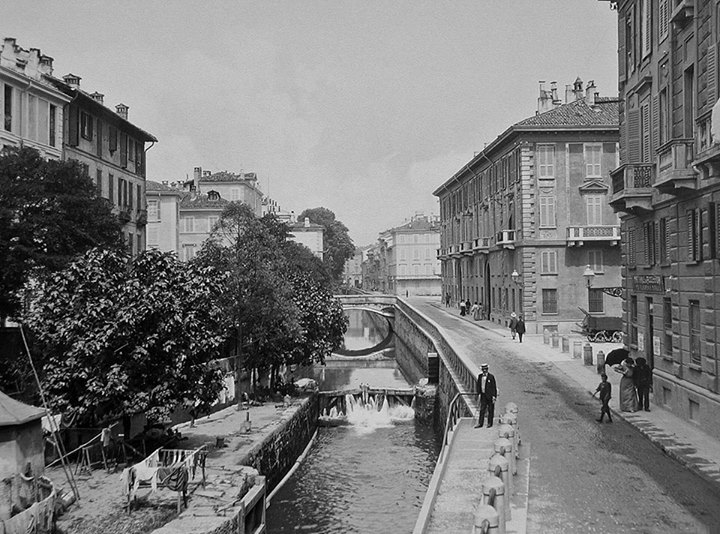
The Cerchia dei Navigli in via Senato, in a photograph from the early 20th century

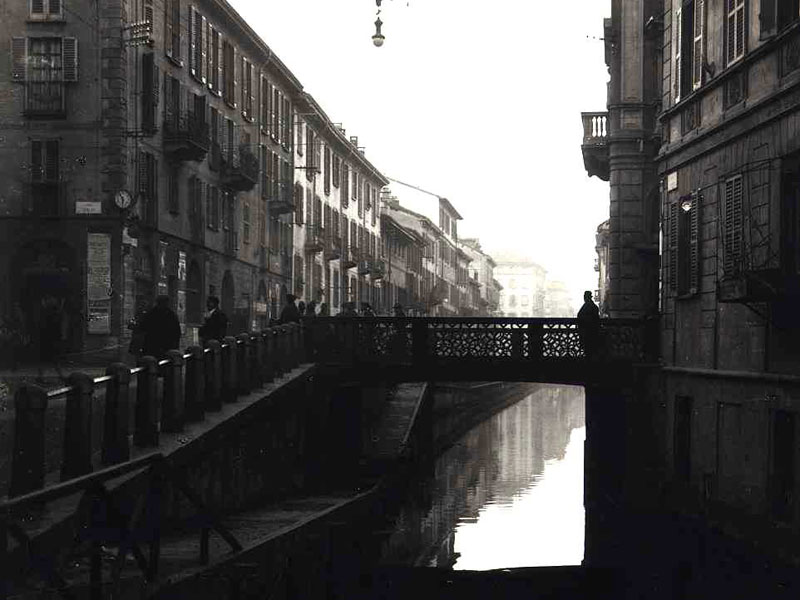
The Cerchia dei Navigli at the height of Corso Italia, between via Molino delle Armi and via Santa Sofia, around 1900

=== Filling ===
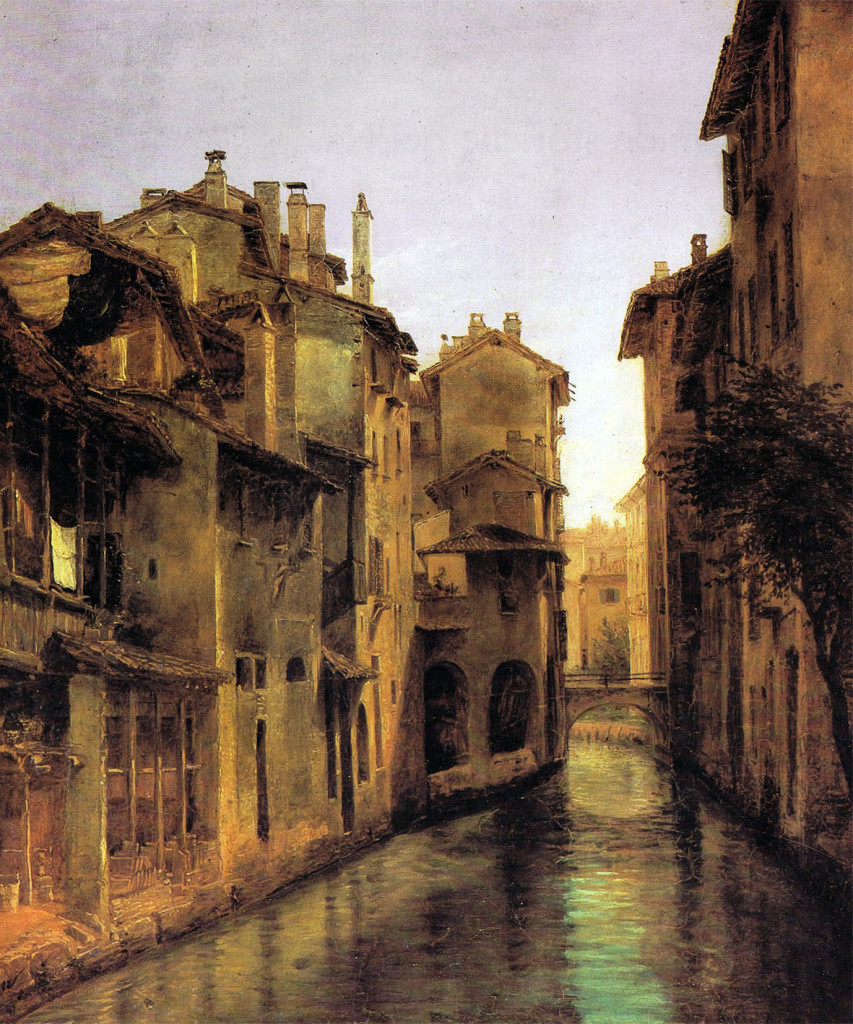
The Naviglio Morto in a painting by Giuseppe Bernardino Bison. The Beatrice bridge is recognizable in the center

The medieval walls were replaced by the Spanish walls of Milan, built between 1548 and 1562, while the Cerchia dei Navigli was completely filled between 1929 and 1930.

Currently, the Naviglio della Martesana reaches the bastions of Porta Nuova, where it sharply changes direction towards the southeast, becoming the Cavo Redefossi. Before the filling of the Cerchia dei Navigli, the Cavo Redefossi was merely a spillway canal for the Naviglio Martesana, which discharged most of its flow into the Cerchia dei Navigli.

In the past, the Naviglio della Martesana continued its urban route, now filled at its intersection with Via Melchiorre Gioia, towards the southwest, passing Porta Nuova, crossing under the Spanish walls, then the Ponte delle Gabelle, and finally reaching the Conca dell'Incoronata, after which it changed its name to Naviglio di San Marco. Shortly after, the latter gave rise to the Laghetto di San Marco, which flowed into the Cerchia dei Navigli through the Conca di San Marco.

The Naviglio and Laghetto di San Marco, the Naviglio Vallone, and the stretch of the Naviglio della Martesana from Porta Nuova to the Conca dell'Incoronata were completely filled concurrently with the closure works of the Cerchia dei Navigli, between 1929 and 1930.

In contrast, the Naviglio Morto and the Naviglio di San Gerolamo, the two branches of the Cerchia dei Navigli originating from the Sforza Castle, were filled earlier, between 1894 and 1895, due to hygiene issues caused by stagnant water (both, as mentioned, had no outlets, as the castle's moat, their original destination, was filled in the 17th century). The Laghetto di Santo Stefano was filled for hygiene reasons, due to stagnant water, in 1857.

The first official document to discuss the filling of the Cerchia dei Navigli was the Piano Beruto, Milan's first general urban plan, approved in 1884: it took nearly five decades for the works to begin, but once started, they proceeded quickly. The city benefited from modernization but radically changed its appearance, losing its identity as a "city of water."

From Luca Beltrami, to Riccardo Bacchelli, to Empio Malara, many commentators argued that modernization and adaptation to mobility and development needs could have been achieved without losing one of the city's distinctive features. Alessandro Manzoni and Filippo Turati held different views, describing the Cerchia dei Navigli, respectively, as an "impure wave" and a "slimy, mottled, putrid vortex" (though Manzoni did not witness the debate on their filling, as he died in 1873). Stendhal, who resided in Milan for seven years in the early 19th century, described the Cerchia dei Navigli positively as "canals-boulevards," evoking the Parisian avenues.

On 3 March 1928, permission was sought from the Ministry of Public Works, with a positive outcome, to fill the Cerchia dei Navigli and the connected canals, namely the stretch of the Naviglio della Martesana from Porta Nuova to the Conca dell'Incoronata, the Naviglio di San Marco, the Naviglio Vallone, and the Laghetto di San Marco. The decision was motivated by new traffic needs and hygiene issues caused by illegal discharges from buildings along the canals, which ended up in the Cerchia dei Navigli instead of the sewer system.

The filling of these Navigli took place between 1929 and 1930: with their disappearance, a ring of roads took their place and name: the Cerchia dei Navigli road network. With the disappearance of the watery Cerchia dei Navigli, the last water mills along its banks also vanished.

The cost to the Municipality for filling the Cerchia dei Navigli and the connected canals was over 27 million lire at the time. Marcello Visconti di Modrone, podestà of Milan, saved on improvement costs, reducing them by 18%.

== Cerchia dei Navigli road network ==
The Cerchia dei Navigli road network, winding from the Cadorna railway station, near Piazza Castello, through via Pontaccio, San Marco, Fatebenefratelli, Piazza Cavour, Senato, San Damiano, Visconti di Modrone, Francesco Sforza, Santa Sofia, Molino delle Armi, Edmondo De Amicis, and Giosuè Carducci, returning to the Cadorna railway station, this time from the side of the namesake piazza, became Milan's innermost ring road, although even at the time it was described as a "noose around the neck" rather than a "road ring," due to its very short radius, which brought vehicular traffic into the city center.

In reality, the ancient navigable route did not entirely coincide with the road network but had a path that, unlike the latter, passed through Porta Nuova, crossed the Conca delle Gabelle, the Conca di San Marco, as well as the namesake laghetto and street; then it reached, at the beginning of via Fatebenefratelli, the canal that circumnavigated the city clockwise (descending waters) up to via De Amicis; from here, the Naviglio del Vallone curved outward (left loop) and descended, through the Conca di Viarenna, to the Darsena di Porta Ticinese to reach the Naviglio Grande and Pavese.

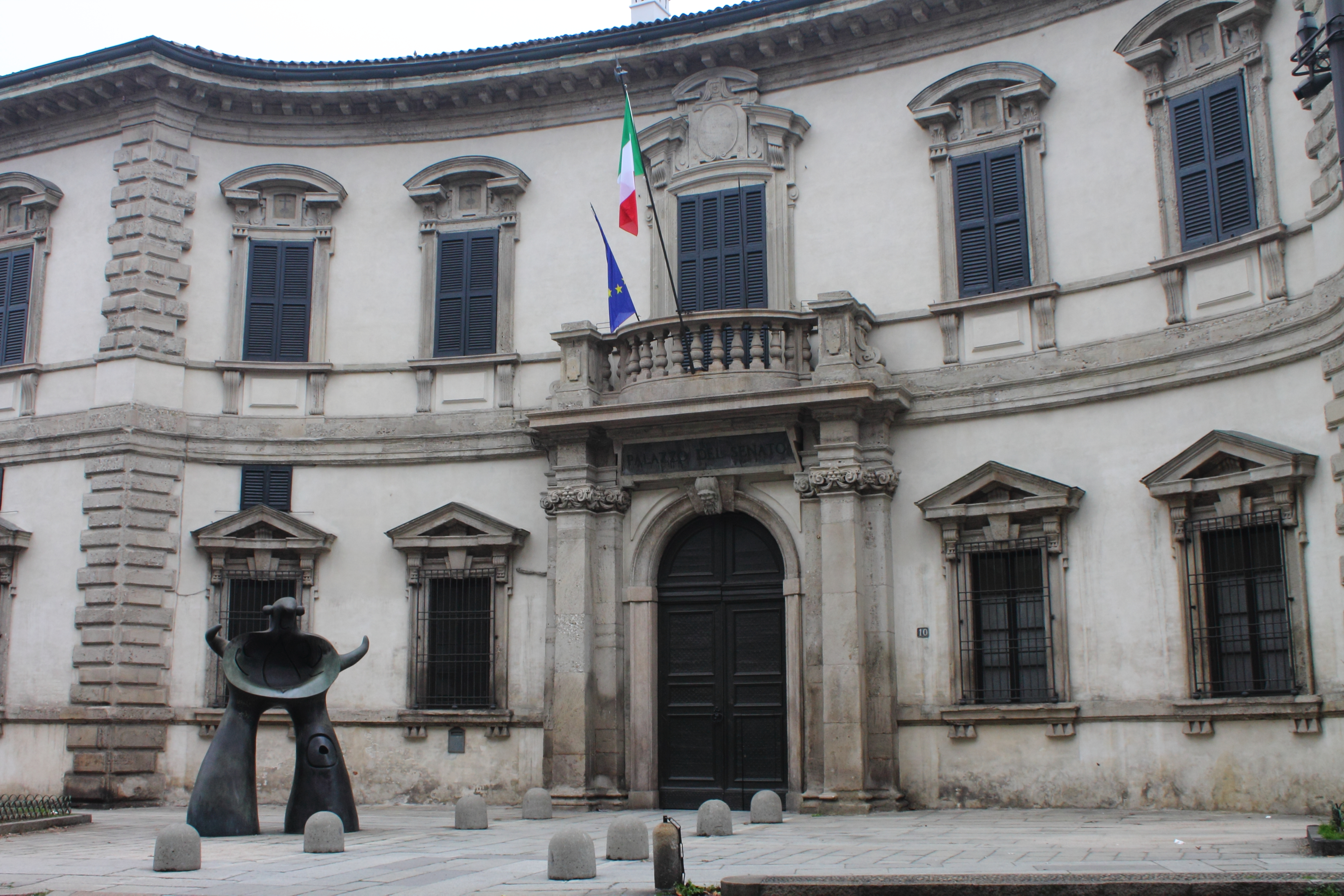
The Palazzo del Senato, now home to the State Archives of Milan and formerly hosting the Milan Senate, located in via Senato, along the Cerchia dei Navigli road network

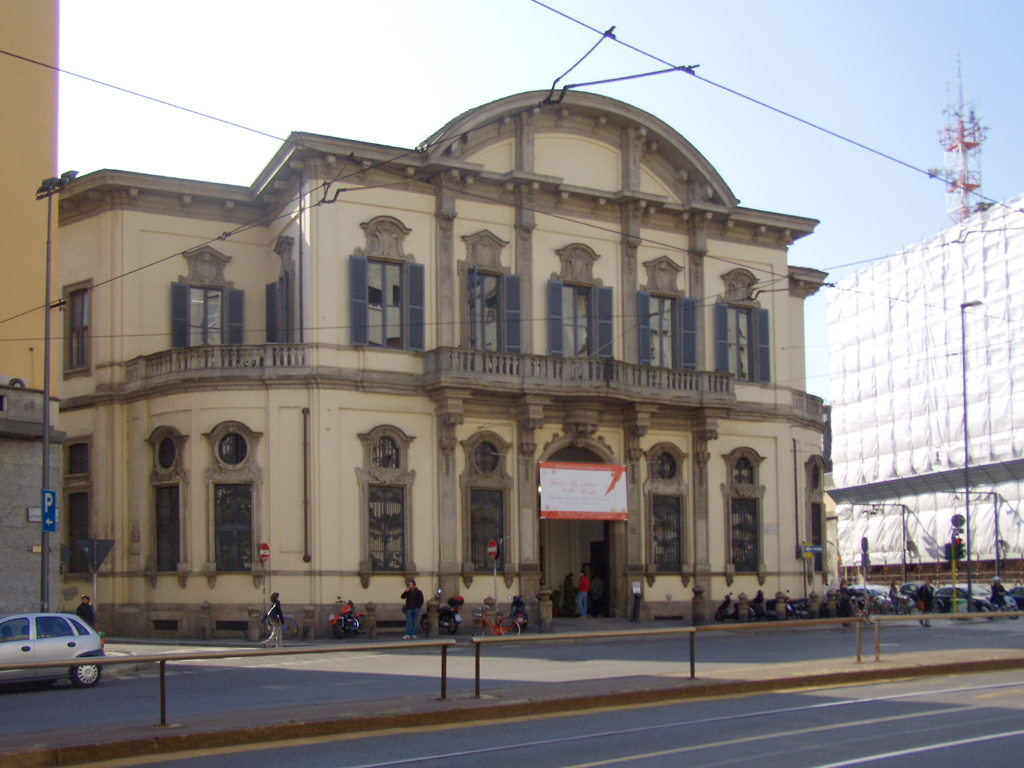
Palazzo Sormani, housing the central municipal library of Milan. It is located along the Cerchia dei Navigli, in via Francesco Sforza

The term "Cerchia dei Navigli" today refers to a ring of roads surrounding the center of Milan, whose route largely coincides with that of the Naviglio Interno. The area of Milan within the cerchia, corresponding to the medieval historic centre, covers 2.97 km².

The streets of modern Milan that are part of the Cerchia dei Navigli road network are:

- via Giosuè Carducci
- via Edmondo De Amicis
- via Molino delle Armi
- via Santa Sofia
- via Francesco Sforza
- via Uberto Visconti di Modrone
- via San Damiano
- via Senato
- via Fatebenefratelli
- via Pontaccio
- via Tivoli
- Piazza Castello

== Reopening project ==
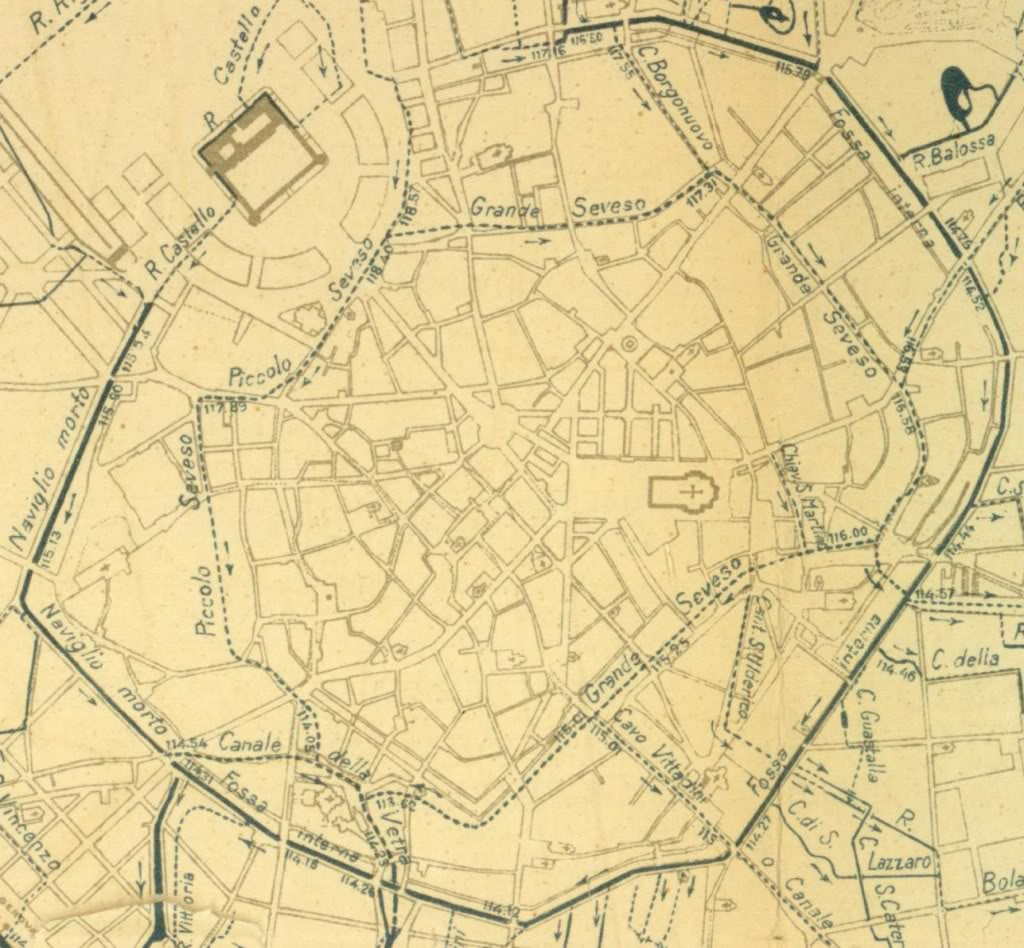
Nineteenth-century map of Milan depicting the hydrography of Milan with the waterways, both natural and artificial, that ran through the city marked. One can see, among others, the Cerchia dei Navigli (here called Fossa interna), the Grande Sevese, the Piccolo Sevese, and the Vetra Canal. Perhaps the Cerchia dei Navigli had Roman origins: the medieval moat may correspond to the refossum, or second Roman moat, lapping the four castles defending the city and located more externally than the first, which instead was the one that bordered the walls

The Faculty of Architecture of the Politecnico di Milano conducted studies from 2008 to 2010 on the possibility of restoring the Cerchia dei Navigli and its connected canals. Professor Roberto Biscardini and architect Andrea Cassone documented these studies in the publication "Riaprire i Navigli si può", published by Biblion Edizioni, Milan, 2012.

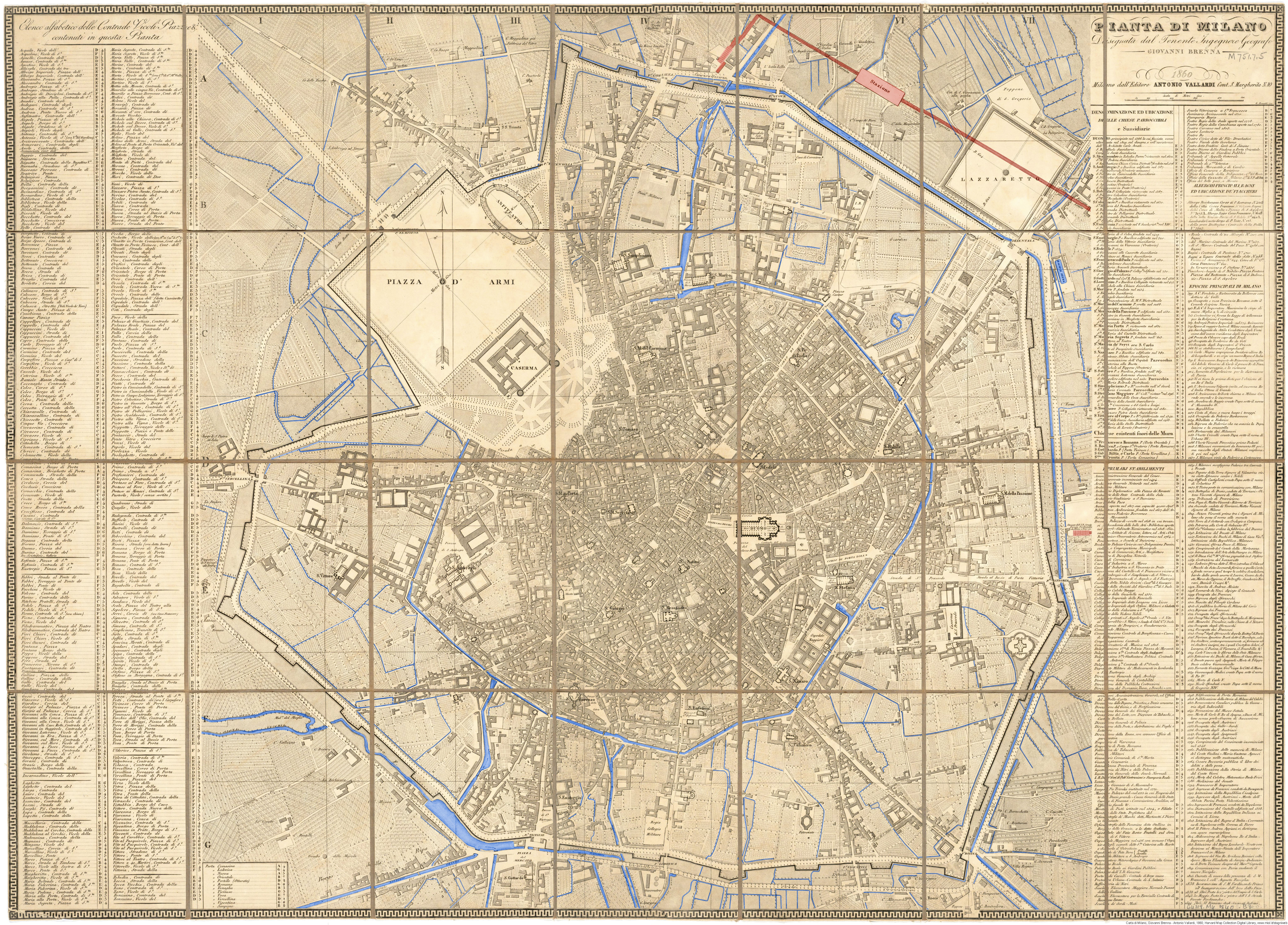
1860 map of Milan. The Cerchia dei Navigli is represented by the innermost circular blue line, which runs for long stretches through the built-up area of the city

The project aims to reopen the Cerchia dei Navigli and its connected canals, restoring the ancient connection between the Naviglio Martesana, from Cassina de' Pomm, where this canal currently goes underground under via Melchiorre Gioia, and the Naviglio Vallone, which would again flow into the Darsena di Porta Ticinese.

This project involves the creation of a new canal, along via Melchiorre Gioia and the Cerchia dei Navigli road ring, spanning eight kilometers, mostly along the ancient riverbed, to ensure the restoration of the hydraulic continuity of Milan's Navigli network.

The general idea of the project was presented to the public in its full complexity for the first time during the presentation of the volume "Riaprire il Naviglio si può" on 15 March 2012 in Milan, in the presence of the then-mayor Giuliano Pisapia.

The project was further illustrated in numerous public meetings, particularly during a series of conferences held on 20 October 2012 at the Teatro Puccini in Milan, titled "Riaprire i Navigli. Un grande progetto per Milano, la Lombardia e i suoi paesaggi", on 15 June 2013 at the Sala Alessi of Palazzo Marino, titled "Rifacciamo Milano con l'acqua", and on 8 February 2014 at Palazzo Morando as part of Arnaldo Chierichetti's exhibition, titled: "L'immagine dei Navigli tra passato e futuro".

According to the study by Biscardini and Cassone, the Naviglio della Martesana from Cassina de' Pomm should continue along via Melchiorre Gioia, cross the Bastioni di Porta Volta, and proceed towards via San Marco, Fatebenefratelli, Senato, San Damiano, Visconti di Modrone, Francesco Sforza, Santa Sofia, Molino delle Armi, Edmondo De Amicis, and Conca del Naviglio up to the Darsena di Porta Ticinese. Existing vehicular road crossings would be preserved, and additional pedestrian crossings could be created.

At regular intervals, discussions about a possible concrete reopening of the Navigli resurface: the latest proposal occurred during preparations for Expo 2015, hosted by Milan.

Regarding the reopening of the Cerchia dei Navigli and its connected canals, on 12 and 13 June 2011, Milanese citizens were called to the polls for a consultative referendum, held concurrently with four other municipal consultative referendums and the four national abrogative referendums: the outcome for the referendum on the Navigli's restoration was overwhelmingly in favor of their reopening, with a percentage of 94.32%.

On 5 October 2017, the Milan city council resolved to organize a new consultative referendum on the reopening of the Cerchia dei Navigli and connected canals, to be held alongside the general elections of 4 March 2018, but the government did not authorize it on that date. Consequently, the city council, to avoid significant costs, decided to replace it with a public consultation on a preliminary project to open part of the route, consisting of five sections for an estimated cost of 150 million euros, postponing the rest of the reopening to a later phase for approximately 350 million euros more. The five sections, totaling 2 km out of the 7.7 km overall, are:

- A via Melchiorre Gioia from Cascina de' Pomm to via Carissimi (850 m)
- B Conca dell'Incoronata (230 m)
- C via Francesco Sforza (410 m)
- D Piazza Vetra and via Molino delle Armi (300 m)
- E Conca di Viarenna (260 m).

They will be connected by an underground pipe to carry water to the various sections.

The consultation took place between June and September 2018 on the technical and economic feasibility project concerning the “Hydraulic Connection Naviglio Martesana – Darsena and the reopening of five sections of the Milanese Navigli,” developed by MM Spa in November 2017. The timeline envisages tendering the work in 2019 and starting construction in 2020. The project should be included in the Municipality of Milan’s Three-Year Public Works Plan attached to the 2019 preliminary budget, which the city council must approve by March 2019.

== See also ==
- Milan
- Walls of Milan

== Bibliography ==
- Bonvesin de la Riva (1974) [1288]. De Magnalibus Mediolani [On the Greatness of Milan] (in Italian). Milan: Pontiggia, ed. Bompiani.
- Enciclopedia Italiana [Italian Encyclopedia] (in Italian). Vol. XXII. Rome: Istituto della Enciclopedia Italiana. 1951.
- Enciclopedia di Milano [Encyclopedia of Milan] (in Italian). Milan: Franco Maria Ricci Editore. 1997.
- Buzzi, Vittore; Buzzi, Claudio (2004). Le vie di Milano Dizionario di toponomastica milanese [The Streets of Milan: Dictionary of Milanese Toponymy] (in Italian). Milan: Ulrico Hoepli.
- Cordani, Roberta, ed. (2004). Milano, il volto di una città perduta [Milan, the Face of a Lost City] (in Italian). Milan: Edizioni Celip.
- Ingold, Alice (2003). Négocier la ville, projet urbain, société et fascisme à Milan [Negotiating the City: Urban Project, Society, and Fascism in Milan] (in French). Rome: Ecole française de Rome.
- Isella, Dante (2017). La Milano dei Navigli, passeggiata letteraria [Milan of the Navigli, a Literary Walk] (in Italian). Milan: Officina Libraria.
