= Mangiagalli =

Mangiagalli is an Italian surname literally translating to 'rooster-eater'. Notable people with the surname include:

- Luigi Mangiagalli (1850–1928) was an Italian scientist, philanthropist, politician
  - Mangiagalli Clinic, a ward of the Milan Polyclinic named after Luigi Mangiagalli
- Riccardo Pick-Mangiagalli (1882–1949), Italian composer and pianist
