= Esposizione Aeronautica Italiana =

1934–1935 exhibition in Fascist Italy

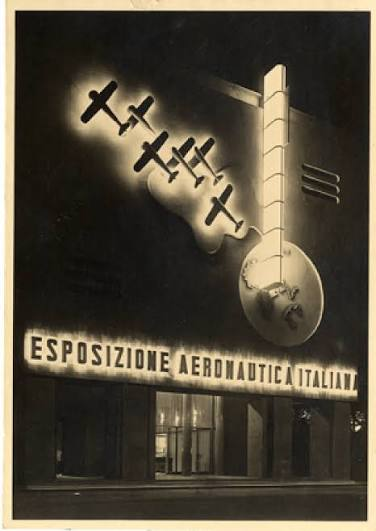
- Façade of the Palazzo dell'Arte on the occasion of the Esposizione Aeronautica Italiana, 1934
- Date: June 1934 – January 1935 (1 year)
- Venue: Palazzo dell'Arte, Milan
- Location: Milan, Kingdom of Italy
- Theme: History of aviation
- Organized by: Marcello Visconti di Modrone

The Esposizione Aeronautica Italiana (Exhibition of Italian Aeronautics) was an exhibition held at the Palazzo dell'Arte in Milan from June 1934 to January 1935. Focusing on military aviation, the exhibition celebrated Italy's aviation successes and attracted over 320,000 visitors.

== Description ==
Conceived by the mayor of Milan, Marcello Visconti di Modrone, the exhibition aimed to survey the history of Italian aviation from Leonardo da Vinci’s early designs to the monumental transatlantic flights of Italo Balbo. The expo highlighted recent milestones, notably the 1933 Decennial Air Cruise and the absolute world speed record set by Francesco Agello in 1934, flying the Macchi M.C.72 at 709.209 km/h.

The exhibition opened with the Sala dei Precursori, which displayed Leonardo da Vinci's Codex Atlanticus alongside drawings by the pioneering aeronautical engineer Enrico Forlanini. The following rooms showcased a variety of aircraft, including the Ansaldo SVA flown by Gabriele d'Annunzio during the Flight over Vienna, the Savoia-Marchetti S.55 piloted by Italo Balbo for the Decennial Air Cruise, the Blériot XI flown by Carlo Maria Piazza during the Italo-Turkish War, and the remains of Francesco Baracca's SPAD S.VII. Pioneer aeronautical engineer Giovanni Battista Caproni collaborated to the exhibition by sending four aircraft, displayed at the exhibition's pavilion at the Palazzo dell'Arte; they were the experimental biplanes: Caproni Ca.1 (the first aircraft flown by Caproni) and Ca.6 (exhibited without the fabric covering of its unusual double-cambered wing), the monoplane, Ca.18 military reconnaissance aircraft and the three-engine biplane Ca.36M bomber.

Following the model of the previous Exhibition of the Fascist Revolution, the Esposizione Aeronautica Italiana combined documentary material and modernist artworks to showcase Italy's achievements in aviation for propaganda purposes. Important artists and architects of the time participated in the exhibition, such as Giuseppe Pagano and Mario Sironi. Designers like Franco Albini, Edoardo Persico, and Marcello Nizzoli created groundbreaking installations using tubular steel and light diaphragms. The exhibition's façade was designed by the painter Erberto Carboni. Pagano designed the final 'Room of Icarus', a chapel dedicated to the martyrs of flight.

== Views of the Exhibition ==
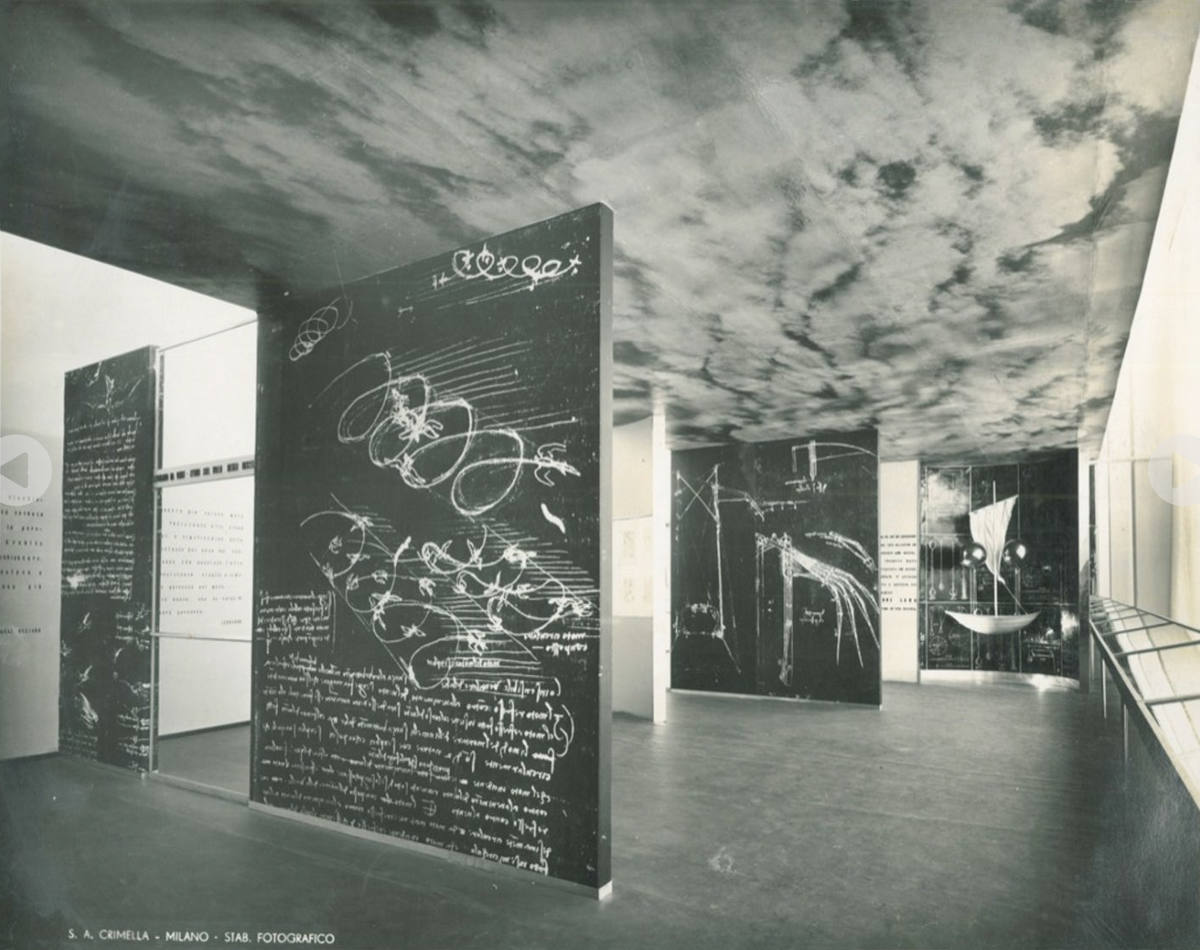
Luigi Figini and Gino Pollini, Sala dei Precursori

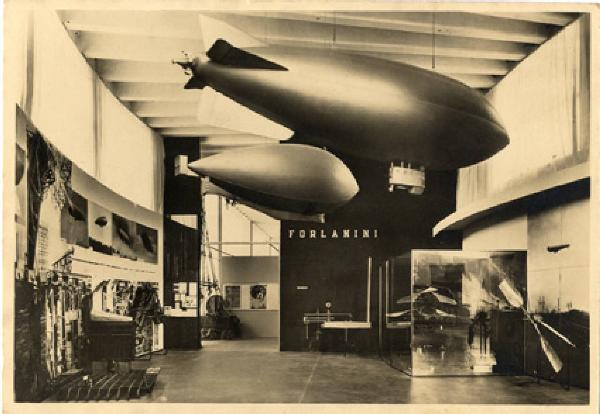
BBPR, Sala Forlanini

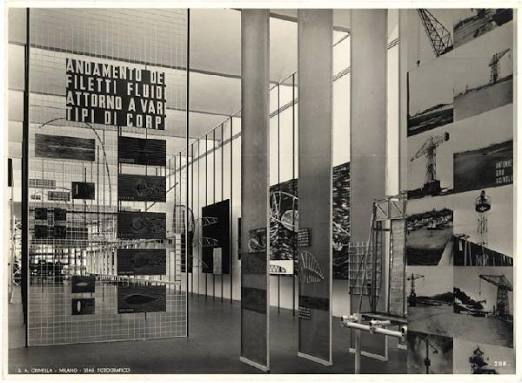
Franco Albini, Sala dell'Aerodinamica

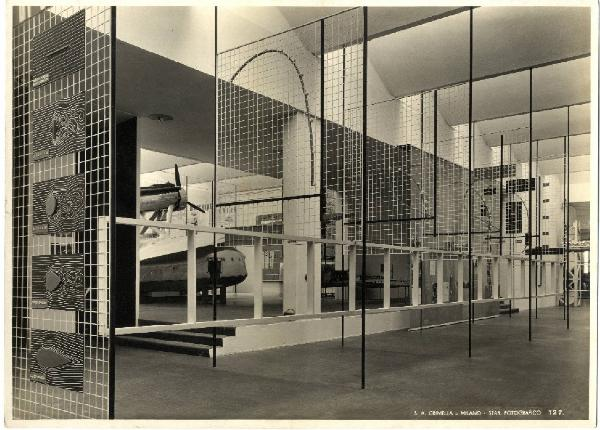
Franco Albini, Sala dell'Aerodinamica

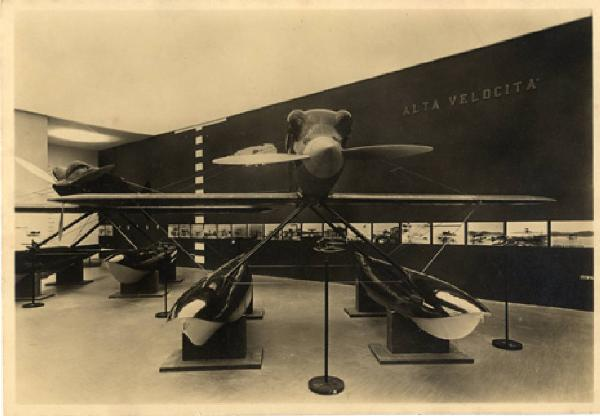
Gian Carlo Palanti, Sala dei raids e dei record

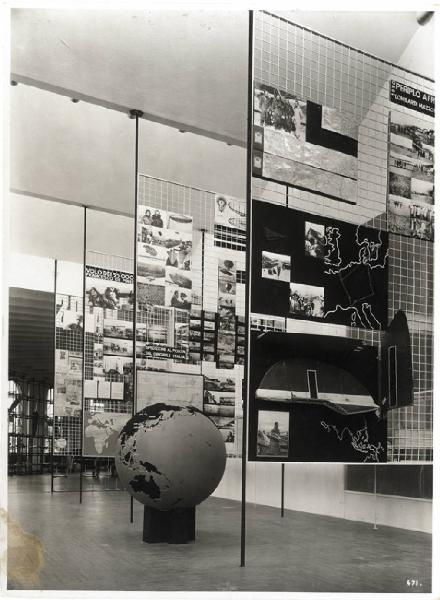
Gian Carlo Palanti, Sala dei raids e dei record

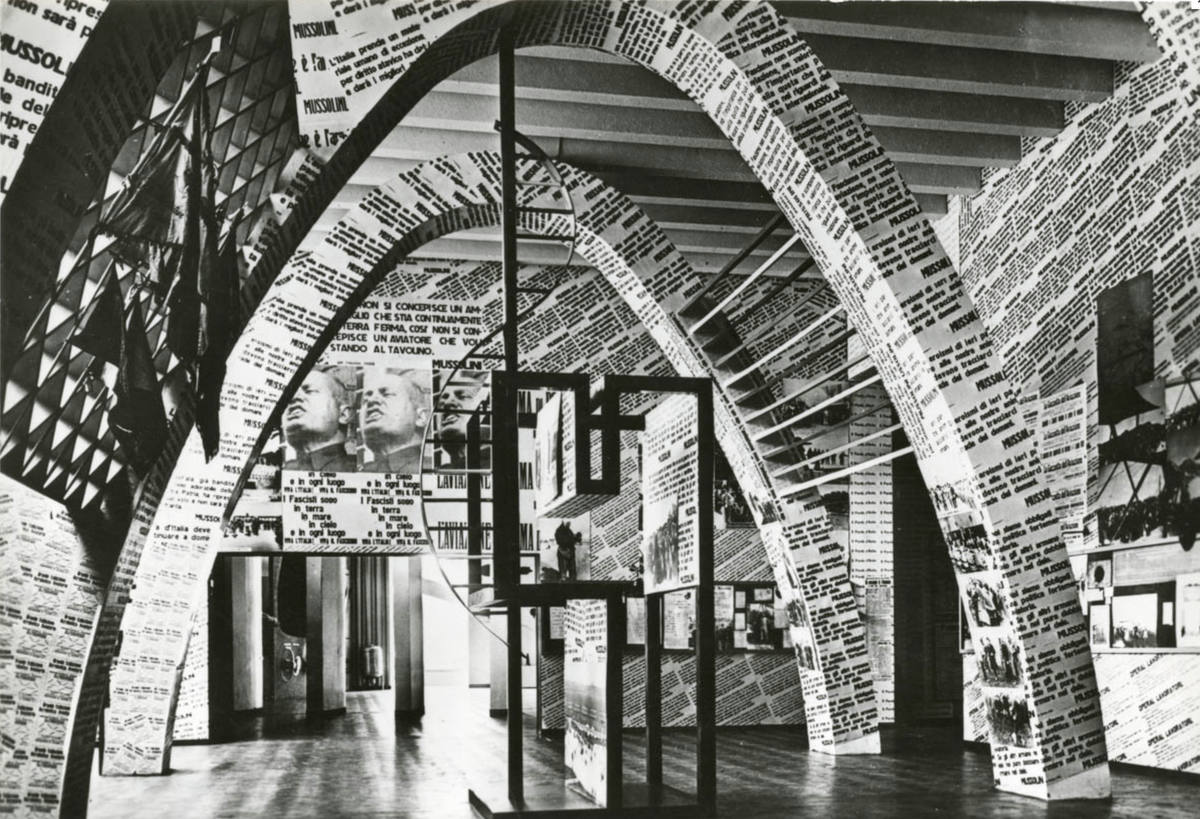
Luciano Baldessari, Sala dell’Aviazione e Fascismo

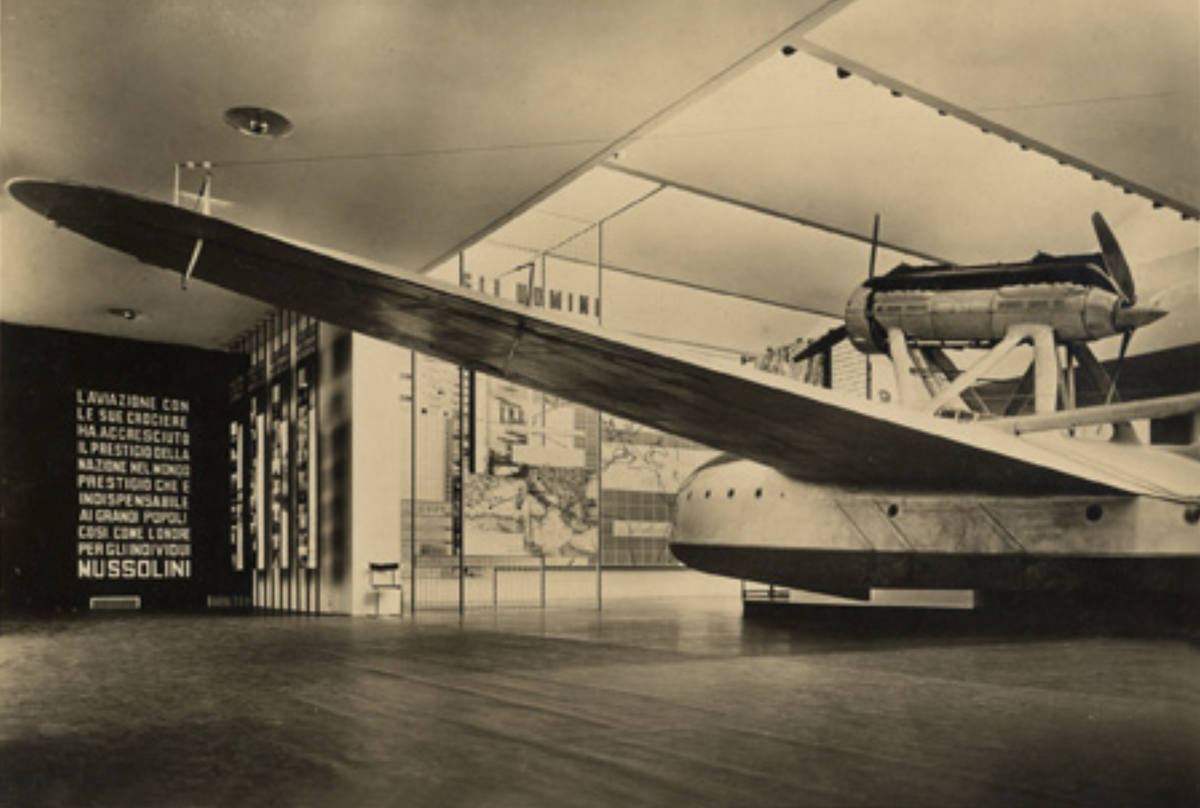
Giovanni Romano and Paolo Clausetti, Sala del volo di Massa

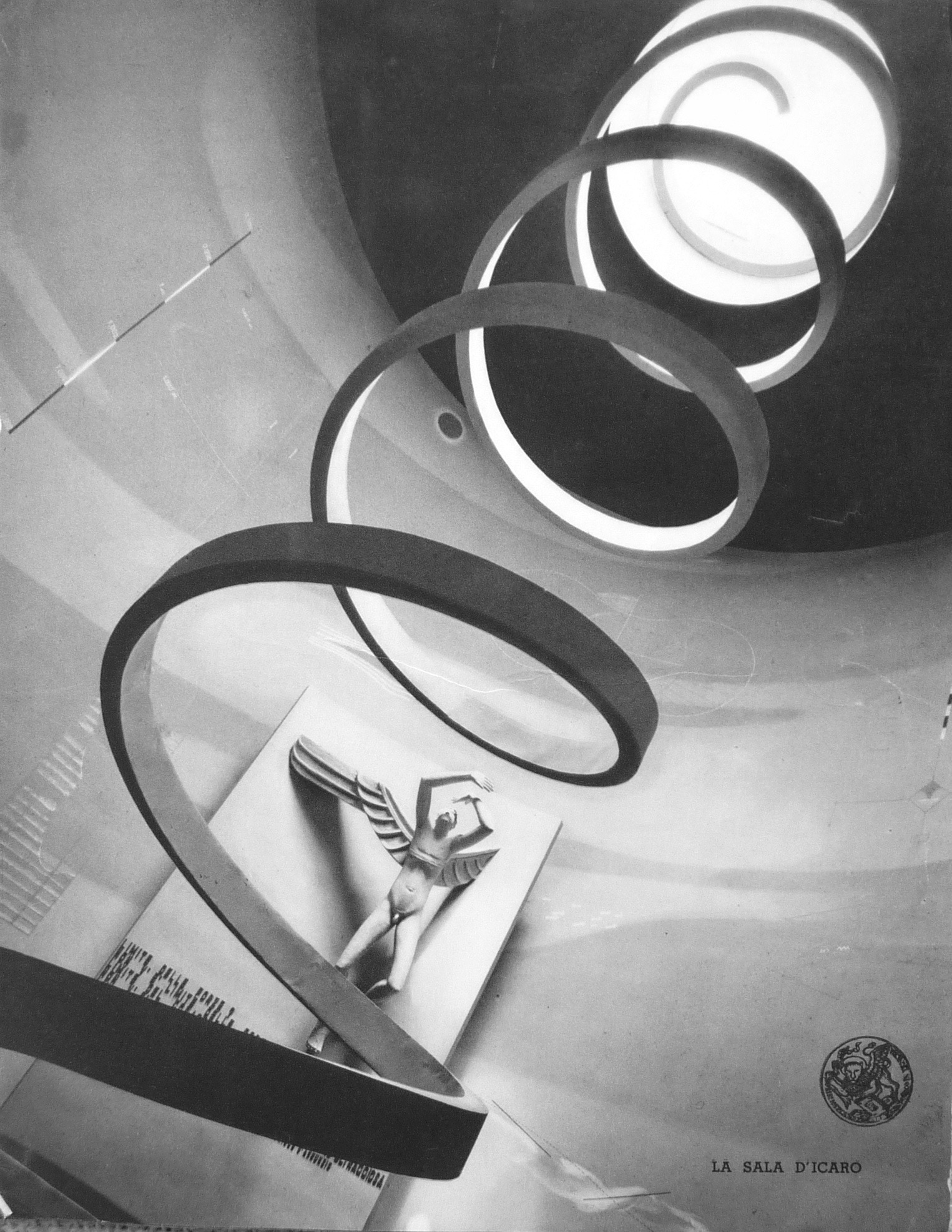
Giuseppe Pagano, Sala di Icaro

== Bibliography ==
- Abate, Rosario; Alegi, Gregory; Apostolo, Giorgio (1992). Aeroplani Caproni – Gianni Caproni ideatore e costruttore di ali italiane (in Italian). Trento, Italy: Museo Caproni.
- Russo, Antonella (1999). Il fascismo in mostra. Storia fotografica della società italiana. Rome: Editori Riuniti.
- Esposito, Fernando (2015). Fascism, Aviation and Mythical Modernity. London: Palgrave Macmillan. ISBN 978-1137362995.
- Salomone, Michele (27 June 2024). "La ricorrenza. La I Mostra dell'Aeronautica (nel 1934): una rassegna tecnico-storica". Barbadillo.
