= Ernesto Belloni =

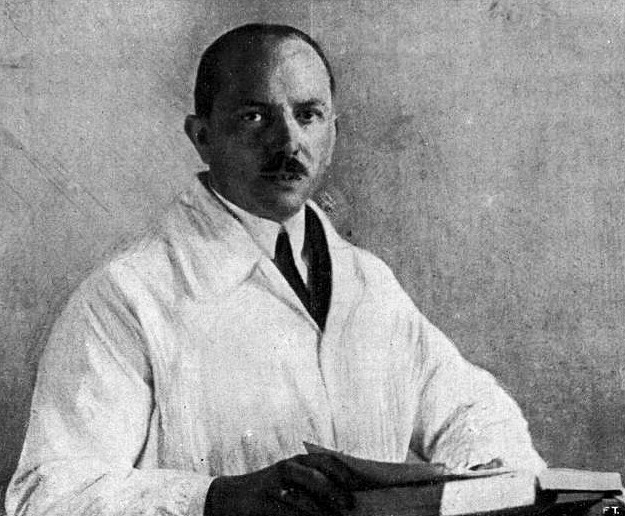
- Born: 23 August 1883
- Died: 23 November 1938 (aged 55)
- Occupation(s): Businessman, academic and politician

Ernesto Belloni (23 August 1883 – 23 November 1938) was an Italian businessman, academic and politician who served as the first podestà of Milan from 1926 to 1928. In 1929 he was accused of corruption and condemned to leave his party and then to a 5-years confino. Under Belloni, the public debt of the city of Milan raised from 60 to 185 million Lire between 1926 and 1927.

Son of a money changer and graduated in Pharmaceutical Chemistry, Ernesto Belloni marked the passage of Milan from the traditional administrative system to the potestarile system of the fascist period, first with his appointment as prefectural commissioner on 3 September 1926 and, in rapid succession, to podestà with royal decree, on 4 December the same year, after having become a deputy to Parliament already in 1924 as a member of the Fascist Party, to which he has already been a member since 1919 of the Milan section.

== Bibliography ==
- Maulsby e M. Lucy, Fascism, Architecture and the Claiming of Modern Milan, 1922–1943, University of Toronto Press, 2014.
- Annalisa Albuzzi, Il cuore di Milano: Identità e storia di una capitale morale, Bur, 2012.

Political offices
Preceded by Luigi Mangiagalli as Mayor of Milan	podestà of Milan; 1926–1928	Succeeded by Giuseppe De Capitani D'Arzago
