= Giuseppe De Capitani D'Arzago =

Italian politician (1870–1945)

Marchese Giuseppe De Capitani D'Arzago
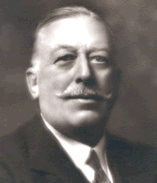

Podestà of Milan
- In office 6 September 1928 – 20 November 1929
- Preceded by: Ernesto Belloni
- Succeeded by: Marcello Visconti di Modrone

Minister of Agriculture
- In office 31 October 1922 – 5 July 1923
- Prime Minister: Benito Mussolini
- Preceded by: Giovanni Bertini
- Succeeded by: merged into the Ministry of National Economy

Member of the Senate of the Kingdom
- In office 24 January 1929 – 19 January 1934
- Appointed by: Victor Emmanuel III

Personal details
- Born: 15 February 1870 Milan, Kingdom of Italy
- Died: 17 November 1945 (aged 75) Paderno Dugnano, Italy
- Party: Italian Liberal Party
- Other political affiliations: National Fascist Party
- Education: University of Pavia
- Profession: politician

The Marchese Don Giuseppe De Capitani D'Arzago (15 February 1870, Milan – 17 November 1945) was an Italian politician who served as the second podestà of Milan from 1928 to 1929. He also served in the Senate and Chamber of Deputies of the Kingdom of Italy. De Capitani was a recipient of the Order of Saints Maurice and Lazarus.

Political offices
Preceded by Ernesto Belloni	podestà of Milan; 1928–1929	Succeeded by Marcello Visconti di Modrone
