= Policlinico of Milan =

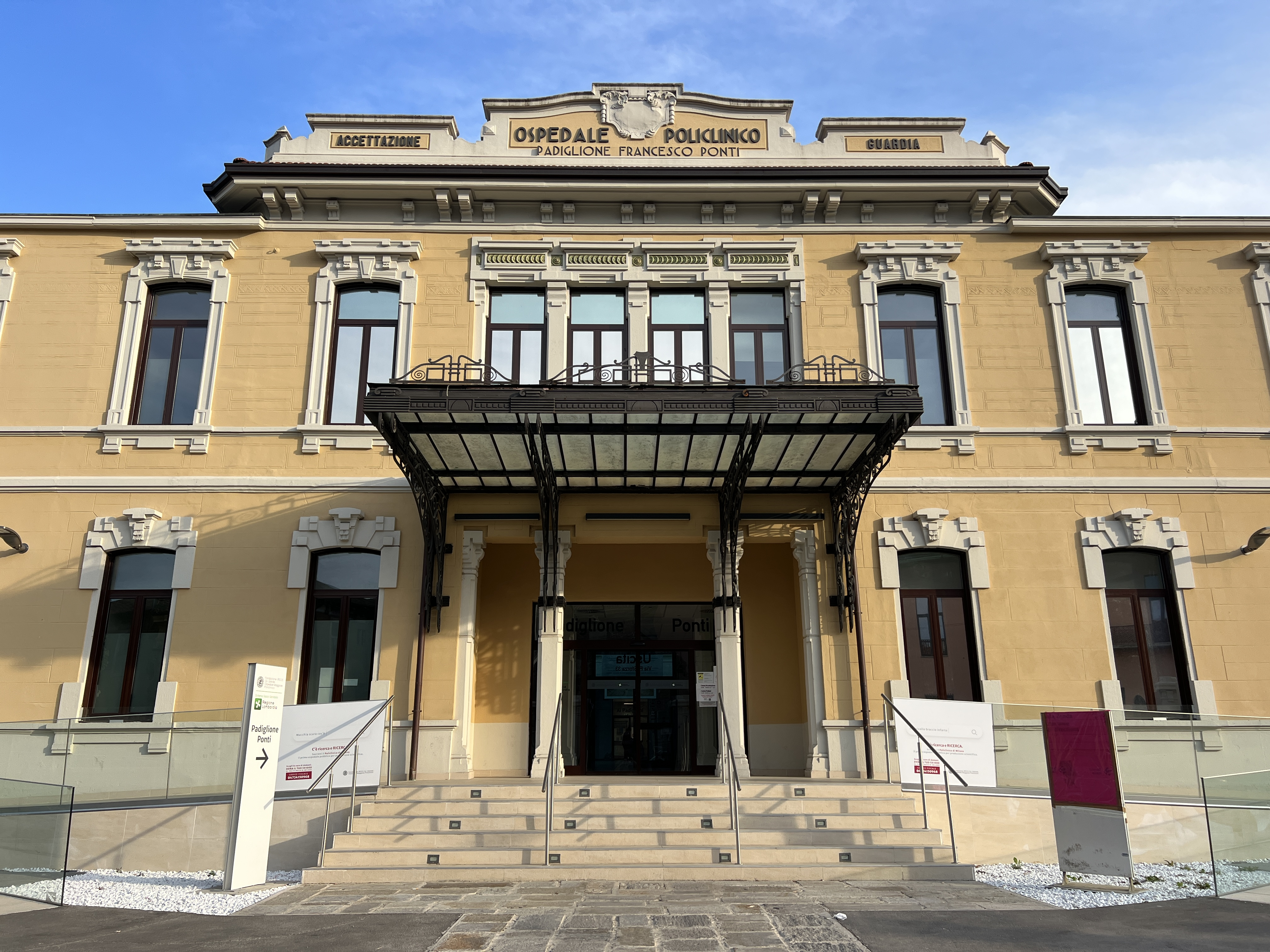

Geography
- Location: via Francesco Sforza, 28, Lombardy, Milan, Italy
- Coordinates: 45.4600°N 9.1924°E

Organisation
- Care system: Public
- Type: Teaching, District General
- Affiliated university: University of Milan

Services
- Emergency department: Yes
- Beds: 900

Helipads
- Helipad: No

History
- Founded: April 1456

Links
- Website: www.policlinico.mi.it
- Lists: Hospitals in Italy

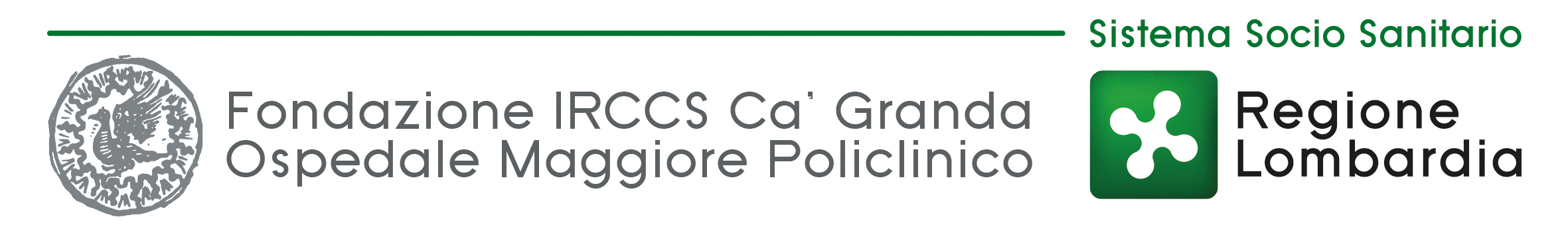

The Policlinico of Milan (Italian: Policlinico di Milano), also known as Ospedale Maggiore di Milano or Ca' Granda Ospedale Maggiore Policlinico, is the public district general hospital in Milan. It is one of the oldest hospitals in Italy, founded by Francesco I of the House of Sforza in 1456. Today it is a modern hospital with 900 beds, with wards for adults, pregnant women and children. During the first COVID-19 breakout in March 2020, 300 of those beds were readapted for COVID-19 patients.

There are three emergency rooms for different categories of patients. The maternity ward (Mangiagalli Clinic) has the highest number of births in Lombardy.

The Foundation is a scientific Institute for Research, Hospitalization and Health Care (IRCCS Italian = Istituto di Ricovero e Cura a Carattere Scientifico), which means that, alongside clinical activity, it promotes research programs with predominantly translational purposes. The programs are concerned with the rapid transfer of therapies from the laboratory to patients.

== Organization ==
As of 2020:

- President: Marco Giachetti (appointment 2019–2023)
- General Director: Ezio Belleri
- Administrative Director: Fabio Agrò
- Medical Director: Laura Chiappa
- Scientific Director: Fabio Blandini

== History ==
In 1456, the Duke of Milan, Francesco I Sforza, founded the Magna Domus Hospitalis (Ca' Granda), a hospital dedicated to Annunciata (a municipality of the province of Brescia, Northern Italy). He did so primarily to gain the affection of its people, who were followers of Milan's Visconti family, even though the Duke was married to Bianca Maria Visconti at the time.

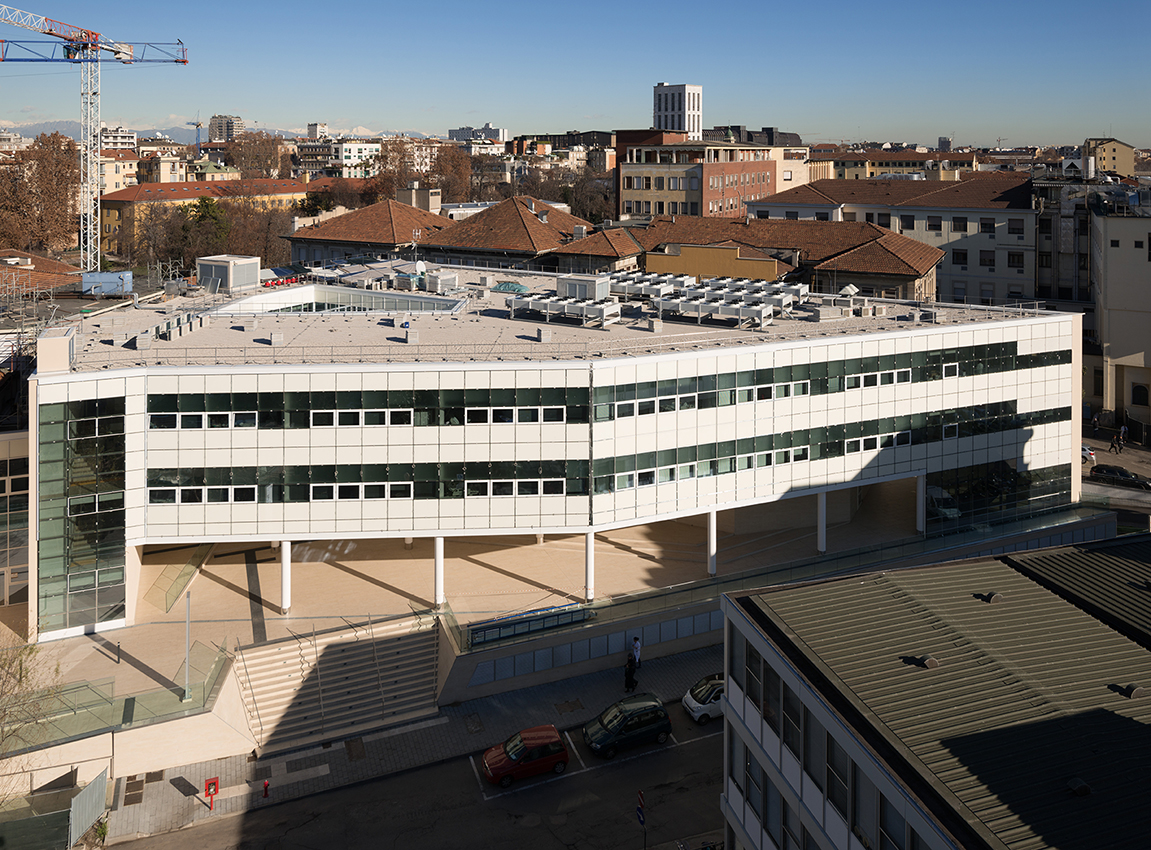
New Guardia Pavilion and First Aid after the renovation works

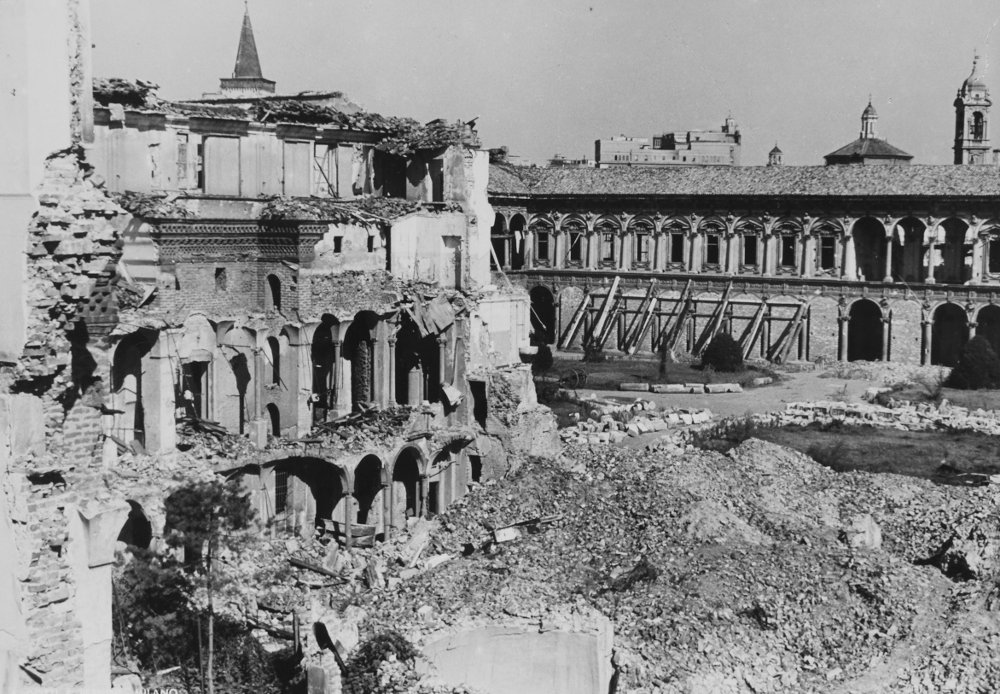
Policlinico's courtyard, now seat of the University of Milan, after the bombing of 1943

Entering Milan victoriously on 25 March 1450 (the day of Annunciation), the Duke decided to dedicate a charitable institution to Annunciata. It was then that the new foundation became the Spedale della Nunciata. Designed by the renowned architect Filarete and built by the engineer Guiniforte Solari (responsible for the courtyard of the Certosa di Pavia, a monastery complex in Lombardy, Northern Italy), the hospital formed part of the completion of the reform of hospitals started by the Archbishop Enrico Rampini in the years of the Golden Ambrosian Republic.

The cloisters' completion and ornamentation were carried out by Giovanni Antonio Amadeo, Solari's son-in-law and pupil. Although the hospital was founded for the poor, it was from the outset a hospital where people with some hope of recovery were treated. Chronic diseases were treated in hospitals outside the city. For this reason, the Ospedale Maggiore has always been the centre of health information in the city.

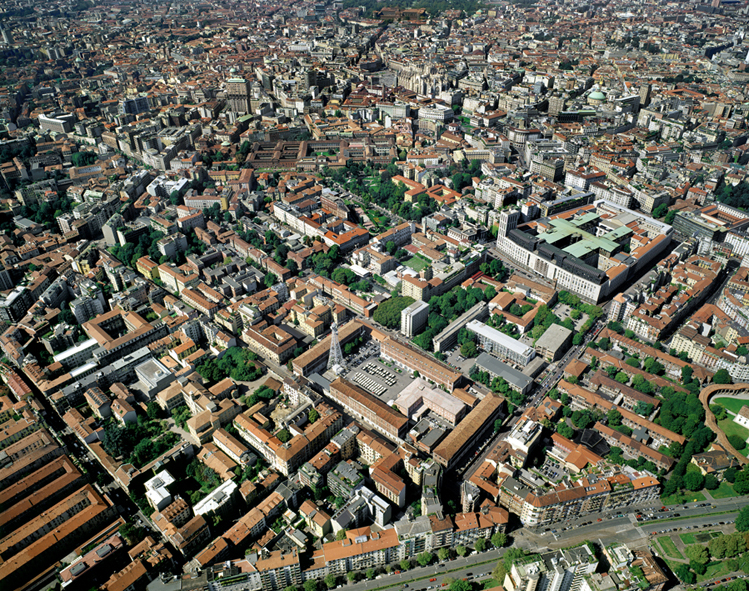
Policlinico's aerial view, before the demolition started between 2010 and 2011

At the beginning of the 20th century, it was decided that the hospital would be moved to a location beyond the canal (where work had already been started on its expansion). This move coincided with the founding of the state university, which took over the old buildings of the Ca' Granda, where it remains today. The Ospedale Maggiore moved to a vast area between the streets of Francesco Sforza (the site of the canal), Porta Romana, Lamarmora and Commenda.

The obstetrics and gynaecology department was the first to be inaugurated by Luigi Mangiagalli (the first Chancellor of the university), and the department still bears his name.

When the hospital moved, it was decided that a general hospital would be created in the area of Niguarda (a neighbouring municipality, which had become part of Milan in 1923). This hospital was designed by Giò Ponti and inaugurated in 1932. It kept the name Ca' Granda, whilst the new general hospital took the name Ospedale Maggiore.

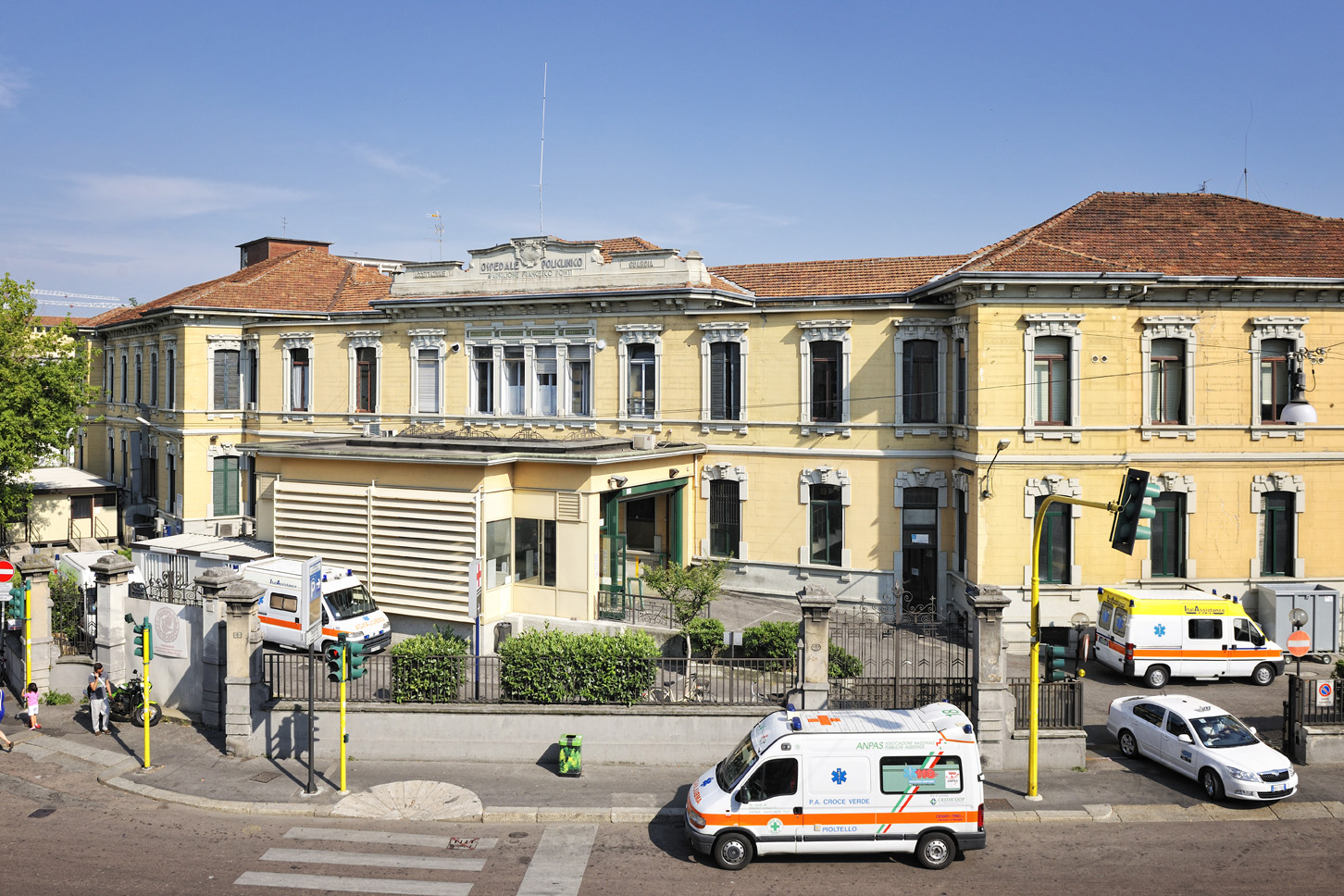
Policlinico's old Guardia Pavilion, before the renovation works started in 2010

Further additions to the hospital institution included the San Carlo Borromeo di Milano (also designed by Giò Ponti) and the Sesto San Giovanni hospitals. The institution was later divided, giving autonomy to the different institutes, whilst others were founded independently and included later.

In 1909, the Adelina brothers and Marco De Marchi founded the Asilo per le madri povere legittime "Regina Elena" (Regina Elena Refuge for Poor Mothers), which remained an independent service until 1990. In 1957, it was converted into a specialist hospital and in 1968 it became the Regina Elena Institute of Obstetrics-Gynaecology and Paediatrics. From 1998 to 2004, the clinical Institutes of Faithful Improvement, Mangiagalli and Regina Elena were placed under the same authority.

In 2010, the name of the hospital was changed, reverting to the former Ca' Granda.

The university has hosted prominent medical doctors and experts, including:

- Carlo Forlanini - inventor of artificial pneumothorax.
- Edoardo Porro - innovator of the caesarean section.
- Baldo Rossi - pioneer of emergency surgery.
- Luigi Mangiagalli - founder of Istituto Ostetrico Ginecologico.
- Luigi Devoto - pioneer of occupational medicine.

== Historical archive ==
=== Insignia and logo ===
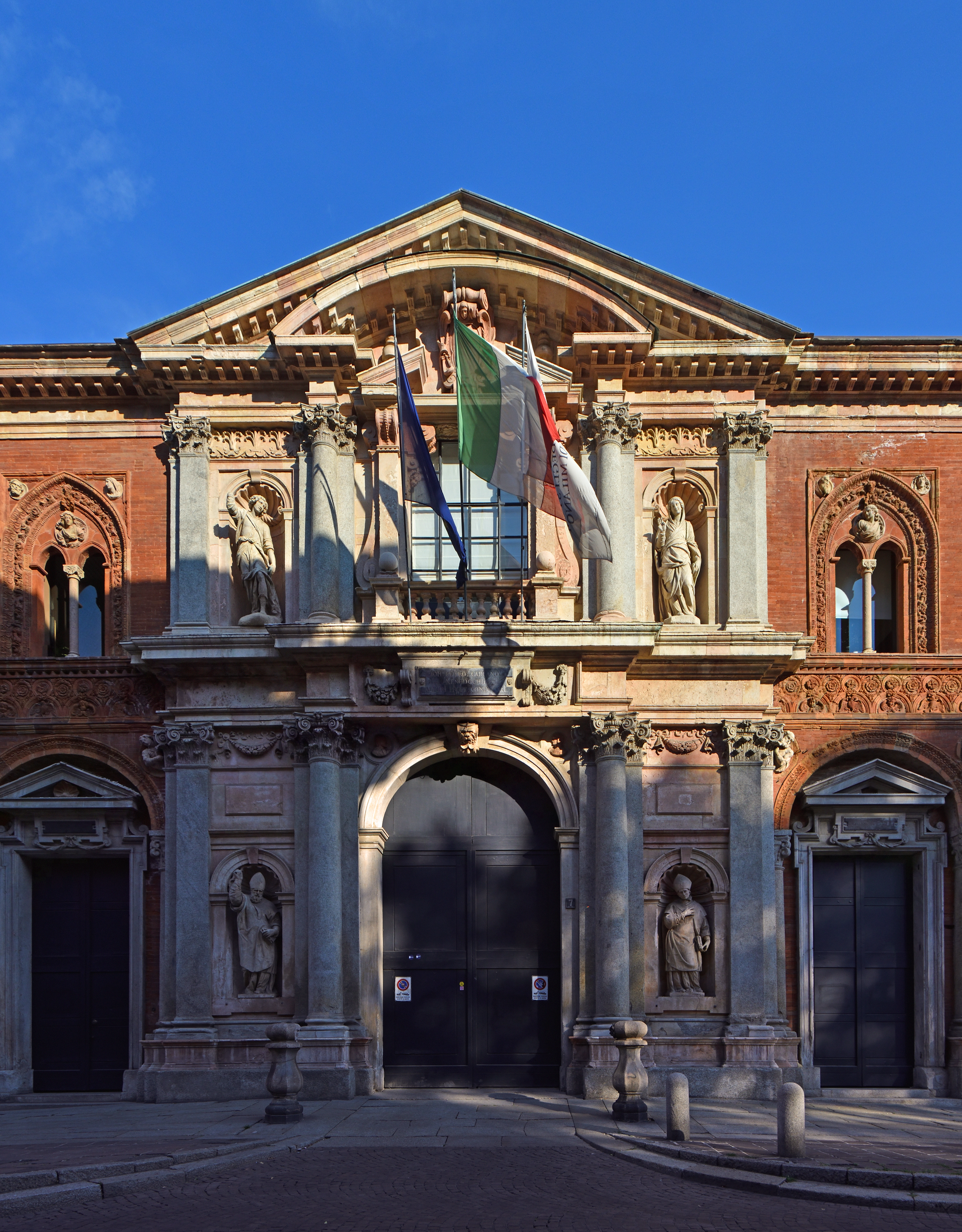
Historical building

The organisation's insignia used to bear the scene of the Annunciation and the Latin motto 'ave gratiae plena' ("hail, full of grace"). Later, it was simplified to a picture of the dove of the Holy Spirit.

The heraldic representation, still the basis of the Foundation's current logo, is closely linked with the Visconti symbol of the flaming, radiant turtle-dove. The olive branch in the bird's beak was added later. Until 1825, the Organisation had the duty of assisting children in need, who were considered as 'the hospital's children', and took the surname 'Colombo', meaning 'dove'.

The Niguarda, Sesto San Giovanni, and San Carlo Borromeo hospitals also obtained insignias or sculptures reminiscent of the dedication.

=== Banner ===
The hospital has two banners of honour: one large banner, maintained in a museum collection, and a pair of smaller banners for use in ceremonies.

The need for a banner to display at ceremonies and funerals of benefactors arose in 1927, and inspiration was taken from the banner of the Municipality of Milan, which has particularly solemn connotations. The front of the banner represents the Annunciation. On the other side, the dove is embroidered, surrounded by the heraldic insignias of the hospital's main benefactors: Sforza, Macchi, Del Sesto, Paravicini, Ponti, Secco Comneno, the municipality of Milano, Pio II Piccolomini, Pio IV Medici di Marignano, Pio XI Ratti, Cardinals Saint Carlo Borromeo e Schuster, and the Order of the Holy Sepulchre.

The project and its realisation were the responsibility of the Milanese architect Giò Ponti, who intended to add value to the banner using both materials and techniques. The metallic parts of the banner were created by the Ravasco firm, and Alfredo Ravasco, the company director, wanted to donate precious stones. Meanwhile, the Bartelli firm had completed the gold and silver embroidery on pure silk. The banner was inaugurated by Cardinal Ildefonso Schuster on 24 March 1935 (the first day of the Festival of Forgiveness) during a solemn function held in Milan's Duomo.

In 1938, a copy was made in order to be able to transport it with ease, with just two poles. The original was moved to a collection in 1942 and decorated with crystals by the Silvestri firm.

=== Book of Elena ===
At the beginning of the 19th century, the Milanese Carlo Ingnazio Busca brought a mummy in a sarcophagus and a papyrus to Milan. Today, the mummy can be found at Sforza Castle, while the papyrus is housed in the Historical Archive of the General Hospital. It is not open to public viewing, but is reproduced digitally with infra-red reflectography thanks to an agreement with the University of Milan's Interdepartmental Centre of Infrared and Diagnostic Reflectography of Cultural Heritage, run by Professor Duilio Bertani.

The ancient Egyptian papyrus is called Libro per uscire dal giorno ("Book to leave the day") and reproduces the famous Book of the Dead, a series of formulae aimed to facilitate the soul on its last journey beyond the western horizon toward the afterlife. The scroll, almost seven metres long, was produced in Thebes for the scribe and designer Pthamose at the beginning of the nineteenth dynasty of Egypt (1305–1200 BC). It shows a complete text, full of drawings, and it mentions a series of formulae to activate several amulets, which is rare in similar papyri.

The heirs of the mummy had to decide what to do with this souvenir, and, taking advice from Dr. Pessani of the Ciceri-Agnesi Fatebenesorelle Hospital, they were persuaded to donate it to the institute's pharmacy (the mummy was in fact, at the time, considered to be a pharmacological remedy). The mummy then became part of the Civic Archaeological and Numismatic Collections at Sforza Castle.

== Departments ==
The Ospedale Maggiore General Hospital- Mangiagalli- Regina Elena Foundation, has two executive committees, which are divided into separate departments.

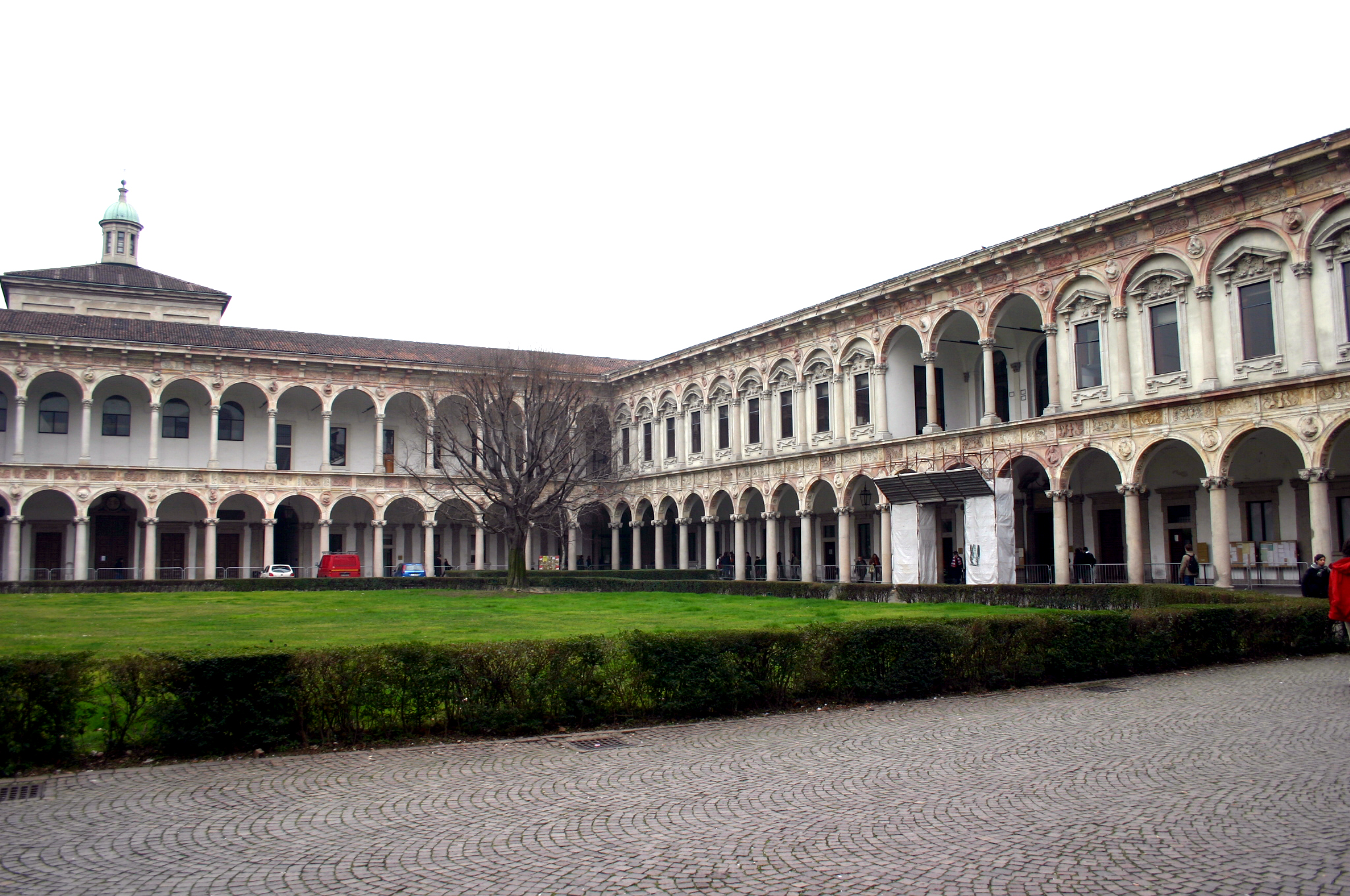
Università Statale courtyard

Ospedale Maggiore General Hospital Committee

- Zonda Department: general surgery and transplants
- Monteggia Department: surgery (head and neck)
- Sacco Department: radiology, gastroenterology, cardiology, lungs
- Granelli-Marcora Department: internal medicine, endocrinology, haematology
- Litta Department: the first to be built in the area beyond the Canal in 1895; it houses the Association of Italian Rescue Workers
- Frigerio Department (Lamarmora): group practice
- Beretta Neuro Department: brain surgery
- Ponti Department: neurology
- Guardia Department: A&E, endoscopy
- Guardia II Department:psychiatry
- Marangoni Department: immunohaematology, transfusions and transplants
- Bosisio Department: pathology

== Centers ==
The hospital hosts the following biological sample banks and centers:

=== Milano Cord Blood Bank ===
The hospital hosts the Milano Cord Blood Bank, which has an inventory of 9,000 umbilical cord blood acquired from donations, which is used for more than 500 stem cell transplants in Italy and abroad.

=== Biobanca ===
The biobank contains about 200,000 samples of biological materials such as serum, cells, DNA and RNA. These samples are kept between -80 and 196 °C and used by about 23 research programmes.

=== Bank of Rare Blood ===
Part of the Transfusional Center, the blood bank is concerned with identifying donors for rare blood groups, as well as coordinating and maintaining regional and national efforts with regards to obtaining units of rare blood groups for cases concerning complex pathologies.

=== Cell Factory "Franco Calori" ===
Cell Factory "Franco Calori" is a GMP facility devoted to the production of cellular therapy products to be employed in experimental clinical protocols. It hosts research efforts mainly dedicated to the study of adult human stem cells, their potential and their differentiating capacity, and a GMP unit for cell manipulation authorized for the production of products for advanced cell therapy.

=== Nord Italia Transplant Program (NITP) ===
It is a collaborative organ donation and transplant program between the 5 regions of Italy and an Autonomous Province. Founded in 1972, the NITp is historically the first Italian organization in the field of transplants. It caters toover 20 million inhabitants in Lombardy, Liguria, Veneto, Friuli-Venezia Giulia, Marche and the Autonomous Province of Trento. The network manages the following centers:

- 93 units providing donors;
- 38 transplantation units (15 for kidney, 3 for kidney-pancreas, 9 for liver, 6 for heart, 4 for lungs and one for intestine) in 16 Hospitals;
- 5 regional coordinators and one from the Autonomous Province of Trento (CRR);
- 1 Interregional Reference Center (CIR).

The Interregional Reference Center (CIR) of this network is located at the IRCCS Foundation Ca Granda Ospedale Maggiore Policlinico, Complex Transplant Coordination Operative Unit.

The main functions of CIR, which operates operating 24/7, are:

- managing waiting lists for patients awaiting transplantation;
- collecting reports from potential organ donors and verifying their suitability and security;
- allocating of organs;
- performing immunologic examinations for donor-recipient compatibility.

=== Fecal Microbial Transplant (FMT) ===
The Policlinico of Milan has been accredited by the National Transplant Center to perform Fecal Microbial Transplants (FMT).

=== Other biobanks ===
The hospital also hosts Bank of Donated Human Milk, a Biobank for the cryoconservation of seminal fluid and muscle tissue, peripheral nerve, DNA and cell culture which exchange valuable biological samples with National and International Institutes both for diagnostic and scientific research purposes.

== See also ==
- University of Milan
