= San Babila, Milan =

Church in Milan

Church of Saint Babylas of Antioch (Chiesa di San Babila)
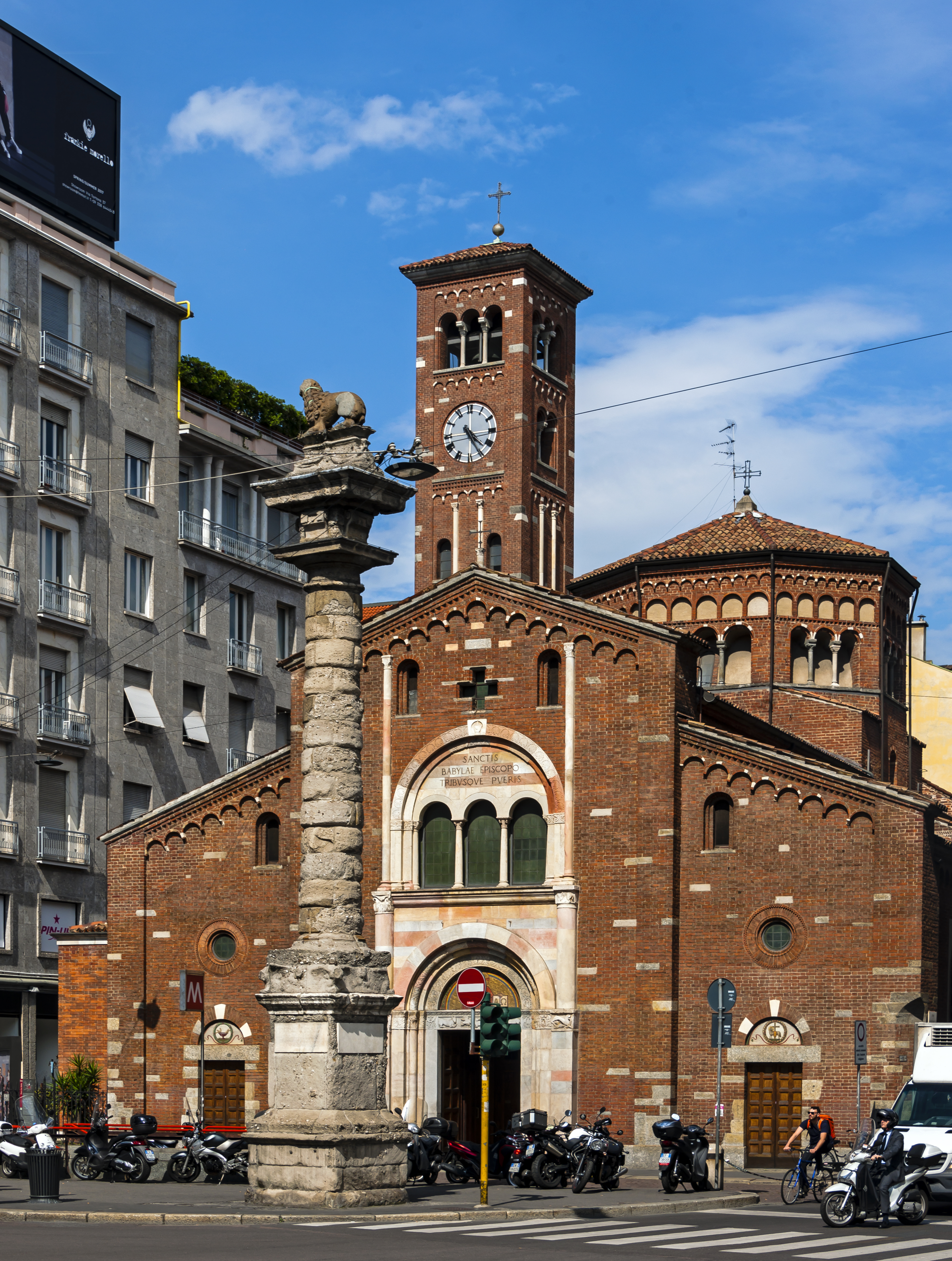
- Façade of the church, 2016

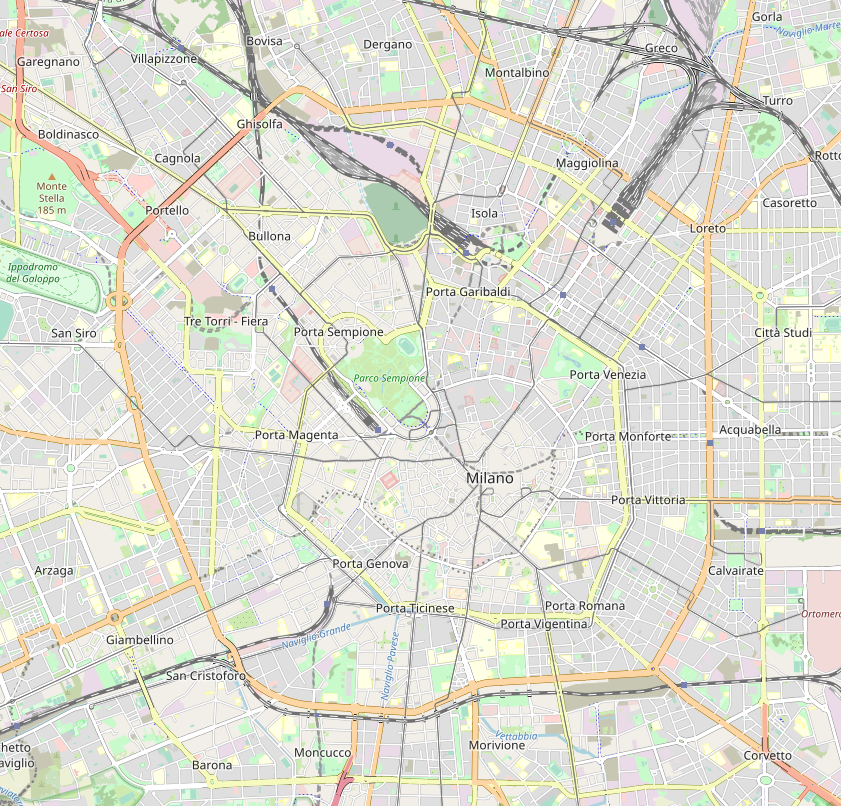
- Location within Milan

Religion
- Affiliation: Roman Catholic
- Province: Milan
- Year consecrated: 11c
- Status: Active

Location
- Location: Milan, Italy
- Coordinates: 45.46695°N 9.19825°E

Architecture
- Type: Church
- Style: Romanesque Revival
- Groundbreaking: 11c

Website
- Sito ufficiale

San Babila is a Romanesque-style Roman Catholic church in Milan, region of Lombardy, Italy. It was once considered the third most important in the city after the Duomo and the Basilica di Sant'Ambrogio. It is dedicated to Saint Babylas of Antioch.

== History and description ==
At the beginning of the 5th century, Marolus, the bishop of Milan, brought from Antioch to Milan relics of saints Babylas of Antioch and Romanus of Caesarea. Marolus founded the Basilica Concilia Sanctorum or church of San Romano, which stood until the 19th century, a few meters south of the church of San Babila, on the site of a Roman temple dedicated to the Sun.

The church of San Babila was built on the same site in about 1095. In the 16th century, the church was extended with an additional construction at the front and a new baroque façade. The church still retains its original medieval fabric, although much was lost due to baroque and modern renovations.

The whole complex was renovated in the 19th century with the intent of restoring the appearance of the medieval basilica, and in the early 20th century, Paolo Cesa Bianchi designed the Neo-Romanesque façade that we now see.

Previous to 1927, the church had a Mannerist facade with pilasters and a protruding portal with columns and a roofline surmounted by spherical pinnacles with palm-leaves above. The bell tower is from 1920, and replaced the original tower which fell down in the 16th century.

The interior has a nave and two aisles; it ends in typical multilobular semicircular Romanesque apses. There are two side chapels that date from the late Renaissance. The right aisle has an image of the Madonna which is highly venerated by the Milanese population.

Inside the basilica there is a Zanin pipe organ (2008), completely made with a mechanical transmission system. The instrument, inspired by the German baroque organs, is used for liturgies and concerts. Currently, the titular organist of the basilica is Michele Zanella.

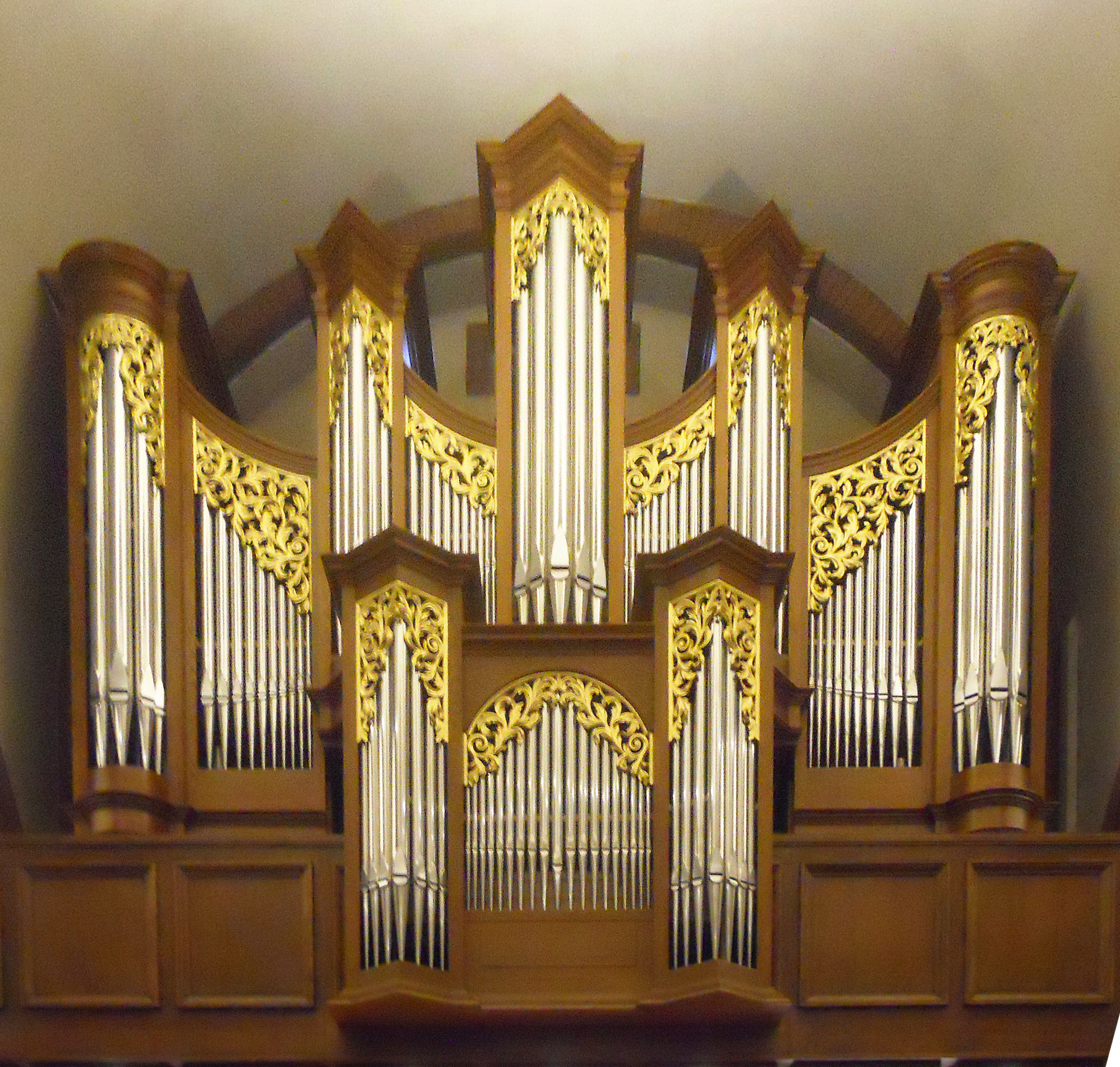
Organ of the San Babila church

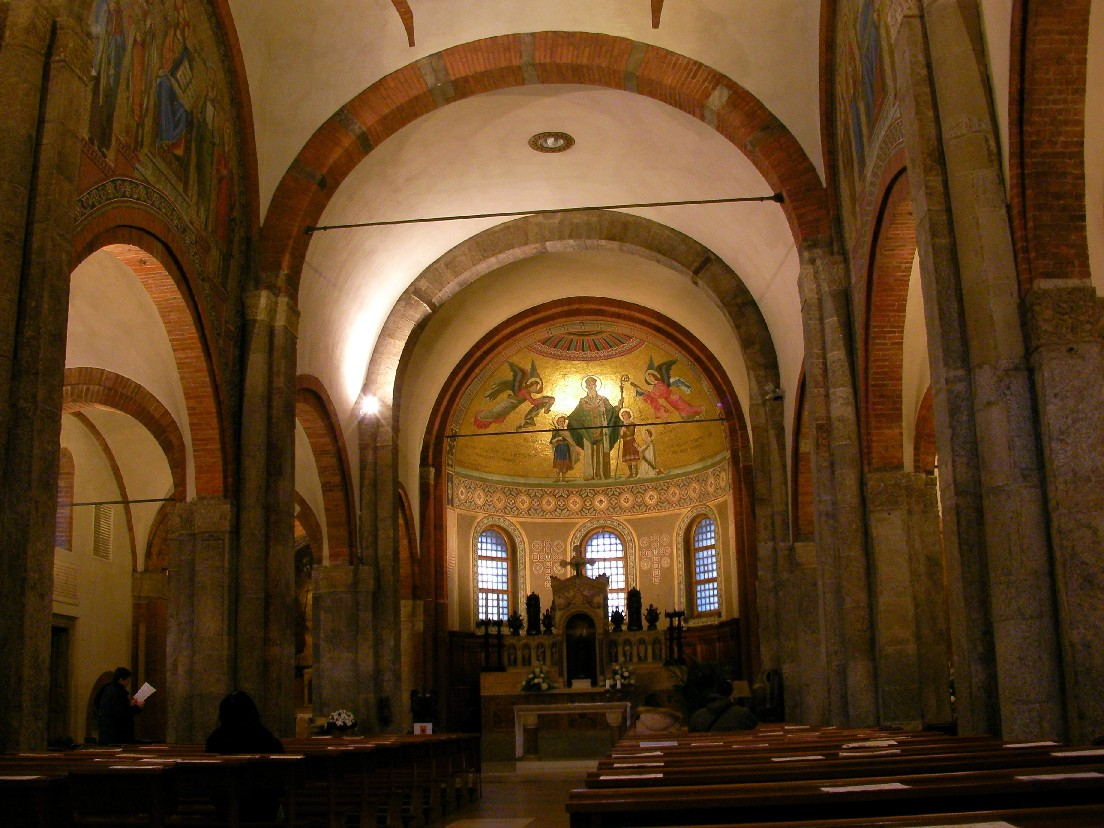
Interior of the San Babila church

== Leone di Porta Orientale ==
The Column of the Lion (Colonna del Leone) in front of the main facade of the church, has a murky history. Inscriptions on the structure recall it derives from spoils of a Milanese victory against the Venetians, suggesting the damaged sculpture dates to the era of the Visconti rule. Another inscription recalls the restoration or erection of the column by someone named Serbelloni, either in 1540 or in 1628. The former date reflects a period when the condottiere Gabriele Serbelloni may have been in Milan. The lion is now the symbol of the neighborhood.
