= Luigi Mangiagalli =

Italian scientist, patriot, philanthropist, politician and mayor of Milan

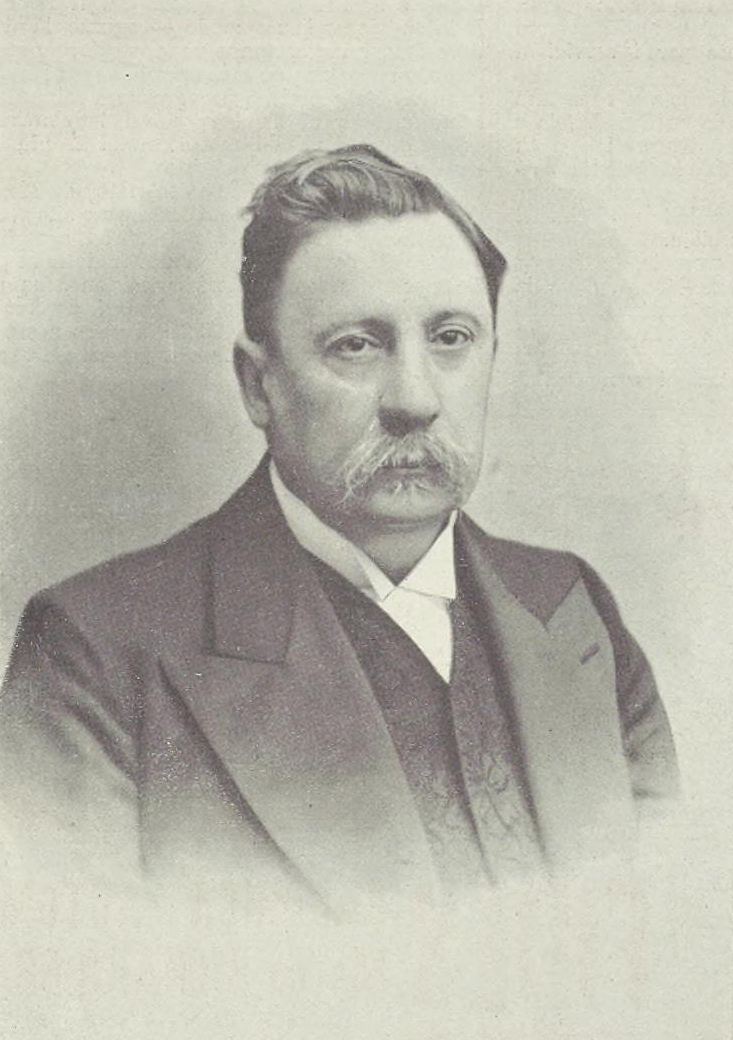
Luigi Mangiagalli

Luigi Mangiagalli (16 June 1850 – 3 July 1928) was an Italian scientist, philanthropist, politician who served as the Mayor of Milan from 1922 to 1926.

He started teaching obstetrics and gynaecology in Sassari, Catania, Pavia and Milan, where he also took the lead of the Istituto Ostetrico Ginecologico. His studies focused on the relationship between heart disease, pregnancy and surgery in neoplastic processes. He promoted many charitable organizations such as: the Istituto Nazionale del cancro (dedicated to king Victor Emmanuel III), the transformation of la Maternità into a big gynecologic and obstetric institution and the foundation of la Città Universitaria. In 1902, he became representative of the Chamber of Deputies and, in 1905, he joined the Senate. During the First World War, he took care of the soldiers and healed the wounded ones. In 1926, he was nominated Minister of State. He is registered in the Famedio.

== Career ==
• 1895-1902: Director of the Clinica Ginecologica of Pavia

• 1902-1905: Director of the Scuola Pareggiata di Ostetricia of Milan

• 1906-1925: Director of the Istituto di Ostetricia e Ginecologica degli Istituti Clinici di Perfezionamento

• 1922-1926: Mayor of Milan

• 1923-1926: First dean of the just founded University

• 11 November 1925: The farewell to teaching and the lively autobiography

• 1926: President of the Società Italiana di Ostetricia e Ginecologia

Political offices
Preceded by Pio Carbonelli as Commissario straordinario	Mayor of Milan; 1922–1926	Succeeded by Ernesto Belloni as Podestà of Milan
