= Marcello Visconti di Modrone =

Italian politician and entrepreneur

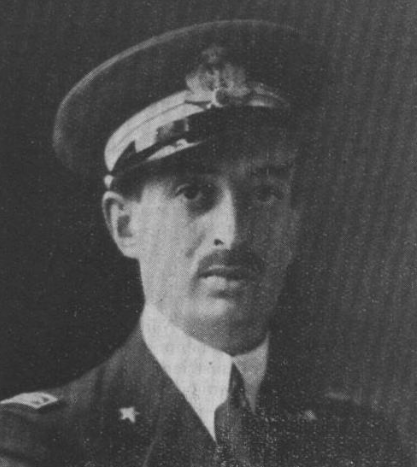
Visconti di Modrone, before 1936

Marcello Visconti di Modrone (18 December 1898 – 5 August 1964) was an Italian businessman and fascist politician who served as the third podestà of Milan from 1929 to 1935. He was a member of the House of Visconti.

Political offices
Preceded by Giuseppe De Capitani D'Arzago	podestà of Milan; 1929–1935	Succeeded by Guido Pesenti
