= Shoemaking =

Process of making footwear

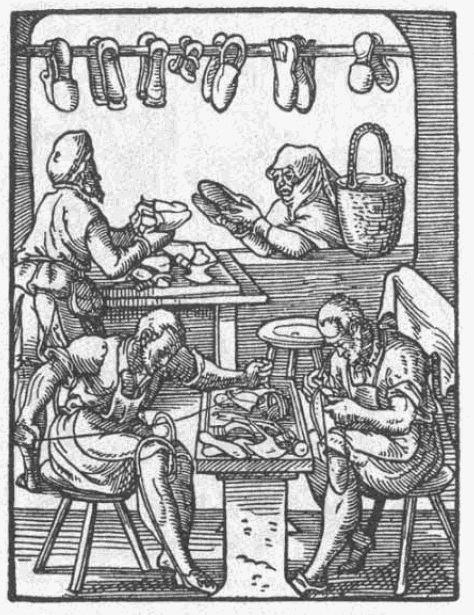
Woodcut of shoemakers from Frankfurt am Main, 1568.

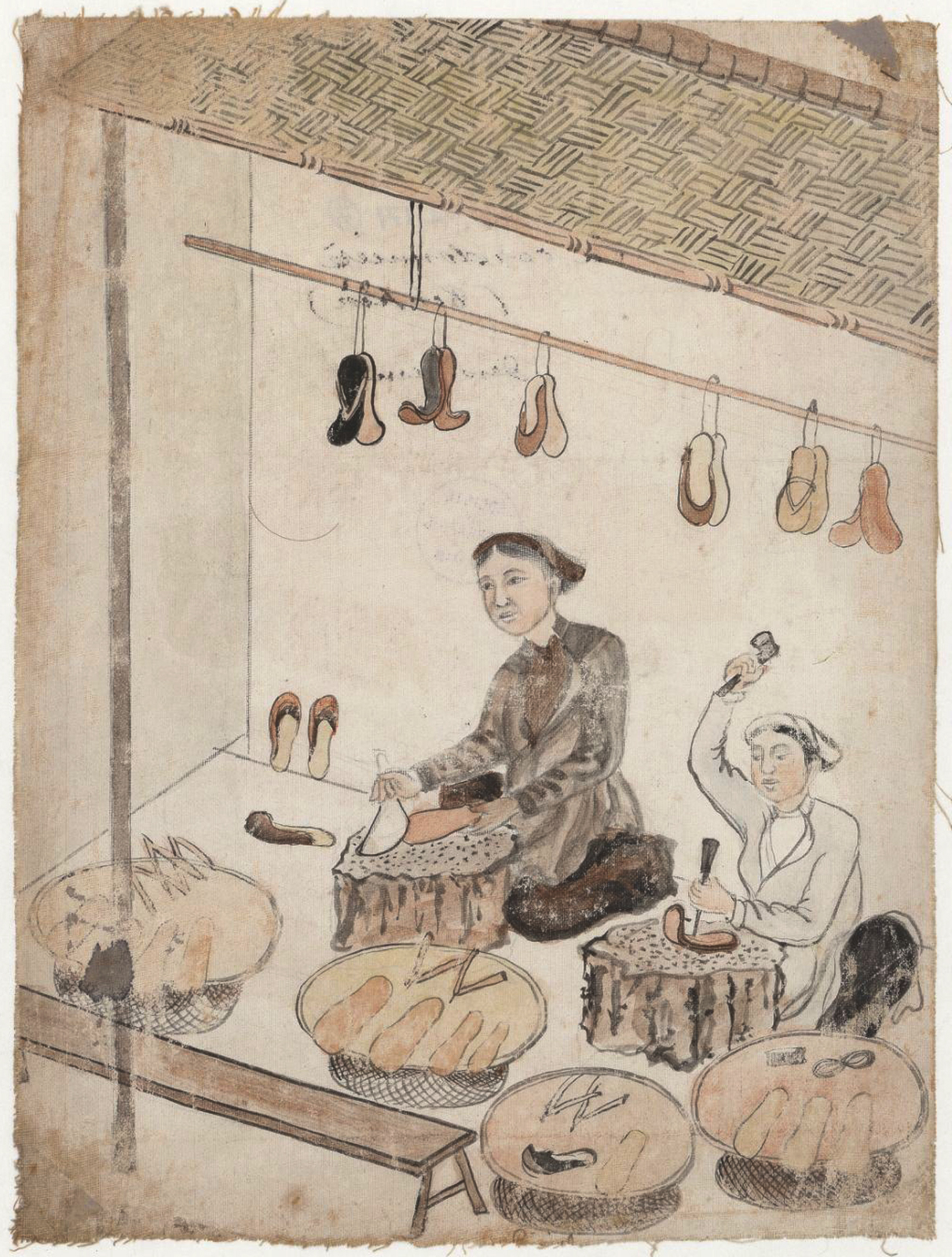
Two shoemakers in Vietnam in 1923.

Shoemaking is the process of making footwear.

Originally, shoes were made one at a time by hand, often by groups of shoemakers, or cordwainers (sometimes misidentified as cobblers, who repair shoes rather than make them). In the 18th century, dozens or even hundreds of masters, journeymen, and apprentices (both men and women) would work together in a shop, dividing the work into individual tasks. A customer could come into a shop, be individually measured, and return to pick up their new shoes in as little as a day. The median price for a pair at the time was about one day’s wages for an average journeyman.

The shoemaking trade flourished in the eighteenth and early nineteenth centuries but began to be affected by industrialization in the later nineteenth century. Traditional handicraft shoemaking has now been largely superseded in volume of shoes produced by industrial mass production of footwear, but not necessarily in quality, attention to detail, or craftsmanship. Today, most shoes are made on a volume basis, rather than a craft basis. A pair of bespoke shoes, made in 2020 according to traditional practices, can be sold for thousands of US dollars.

Shoemakers may produce a range of footwear items, including shoes, boots, sandals, clogs and moccasins. Such items are generally made of leather, wood, rubber, plastic, jute or other plant material, and often consist of multiple parts for better durability of the sole, stitched to a leather upper part.

Trades that engage in shoemaking have included the cordwainer's and cobbler's trades. The term cobbler was originally used pejoratively to indicate that someone did not know their craft; in the 18th century, it became a term for those who repaired shoes but did not know enough to make them.

== History ==
=== Traditional methods ===
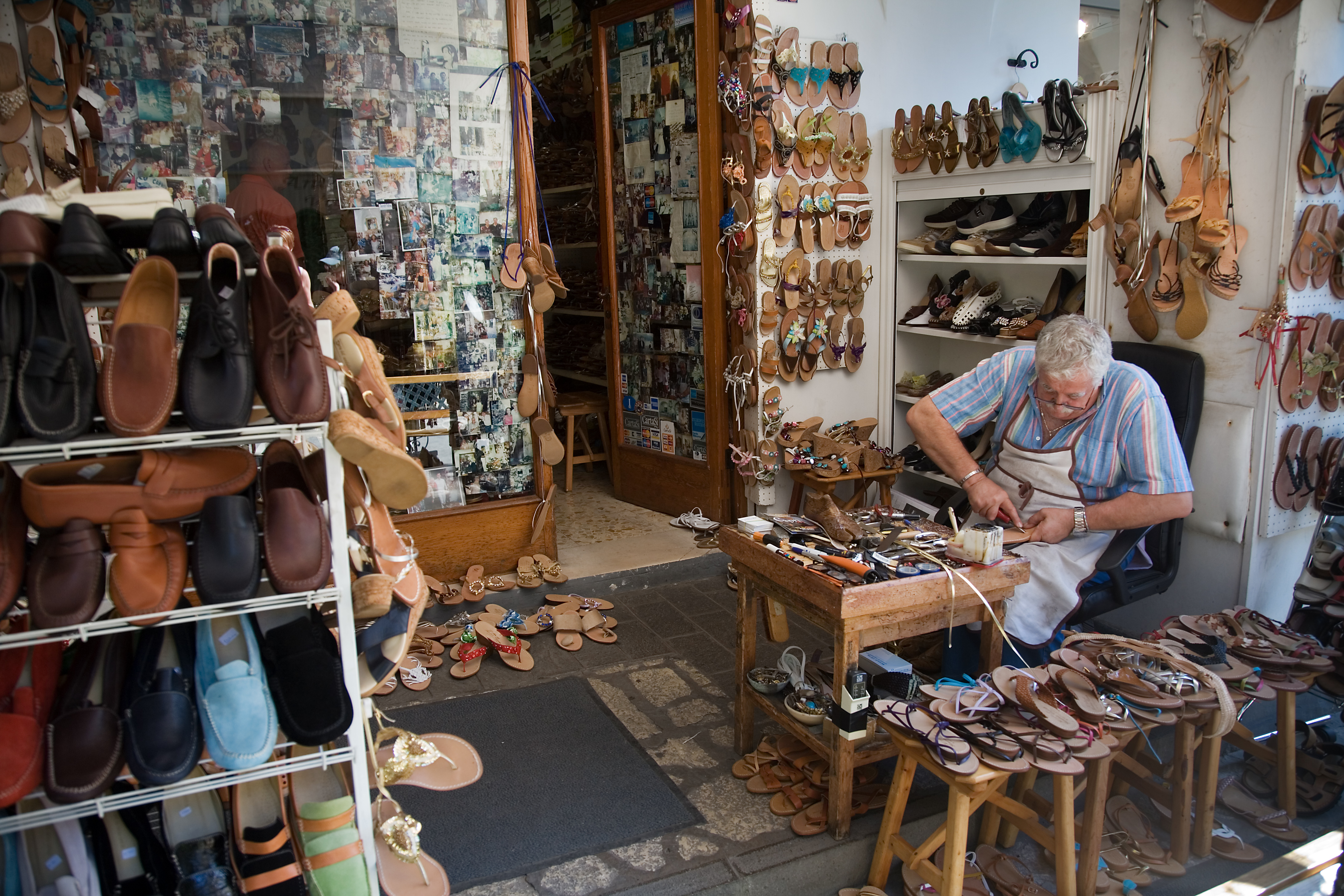
A cordwainer making shoes, in Capri, Italy.

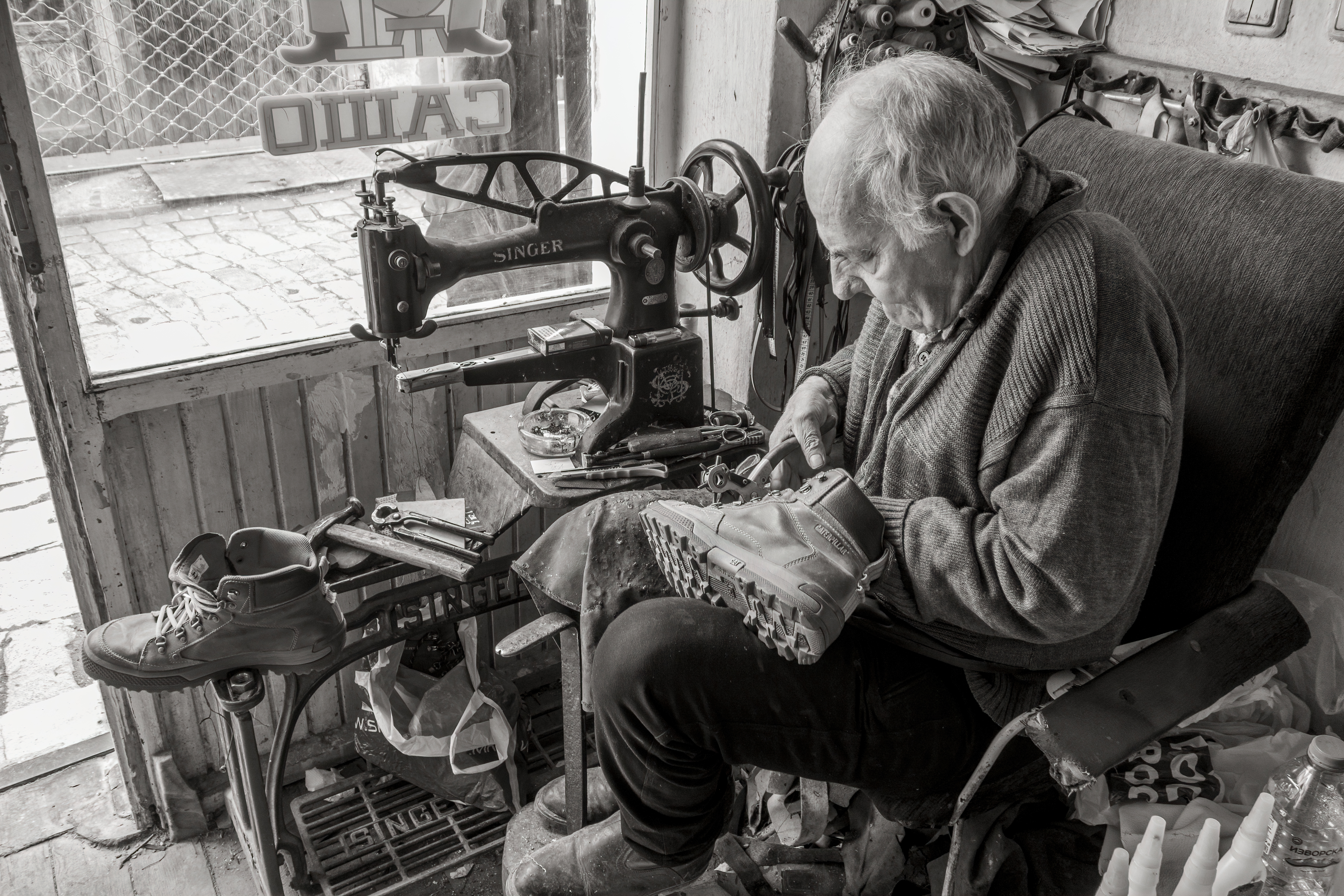
Cobbler repairing shoes in his old workshop, bazaar in Bitola, North Macedonia.

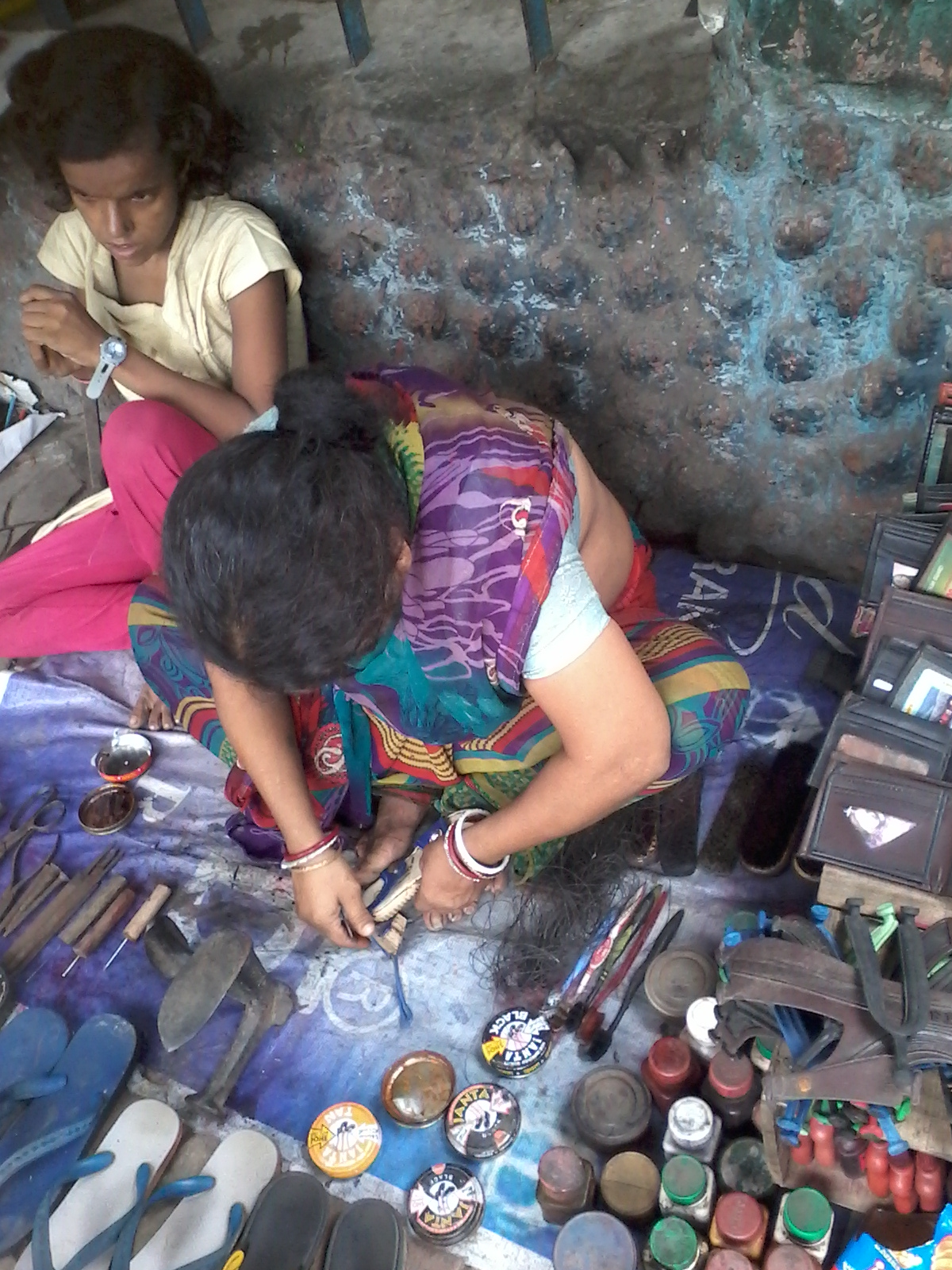
Roadside lady cobbler, in front of Kalighat Metro station gate, Kolkata, India.

For most of history, shoemaking has been a handicraft, limited to time-consuming manufacturing by hand. Traditional shoemakers used more than 15 different techniques for making shoes, including pegged construction, English welted (machine-made versions are referred to as "Goodyear welted" after the inventor of the technique), goyser welted, Norwegian, stitch down, turnout, German sewn, moccasin, bolognese stitched, and blake-stitched.

The most basic foot protection, used since ancient times in the Mediterranean area, was the sandal, which consisted of a protective sole, held to the foot with leather thongs or cords of various materials. Similar footwear worn in the Far East was made from plaited grass or palm fronds. In climates that required a full foot covering, a single piece of untanned hide was laced with a thong, providing full protection for the foot and so made a complete covering.

The production of clogs (wooden shoes) was widespread in medieval Europe. They were made from a single piece of wood roughly cut into shoe form. A variant of this form was a wooden sole to which a leather upper was attached. The sole and heel were made from one piece of maple or ash two-inches thick, and a little longer and broader than the desired size of shoe. The outer side of the sole and heel was fashioned with a long chisel-edged implement, called the clogger's knife or stock; while a second implement, called the groover, made a groove around the side of the sole. With the use of a 'hollower', the inner sole's contours were adapted to the shape of the foot. The leather uppers were then fitted closely to the groove around the sole. Clogs were of great advantage to workers in muddy and damp conditions, keeping the feet dry and comfortable.

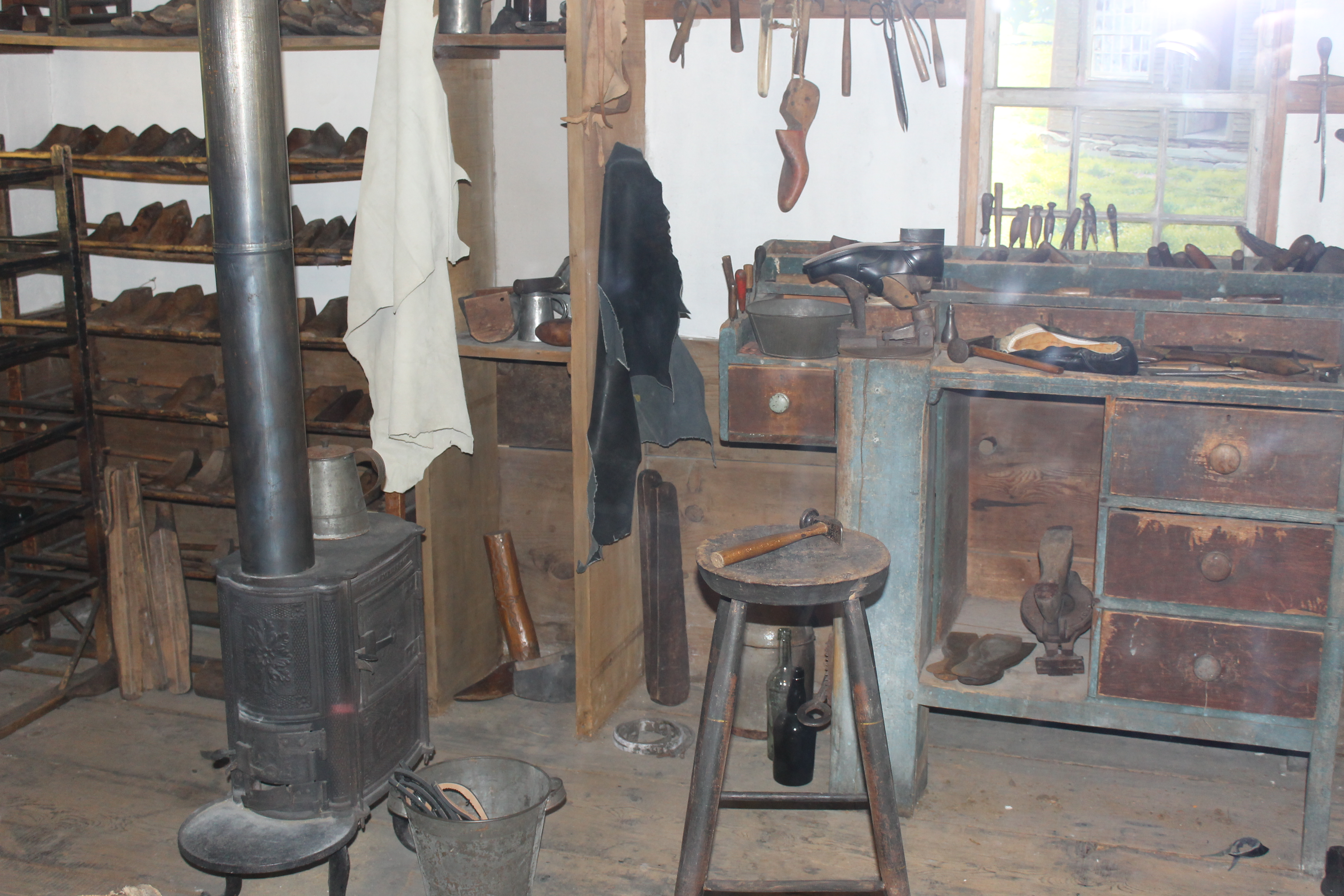
Early shoemaking shop on exhibit at Maine State Museum in Augusta, Maine.

By the 1600s, leather shoes came in two main types. 'Turn shoes' consisted of one thin flexible sole, which was sewed to the upper while outside in and turned over when completed. This type was used for making slippers and similar shoes. The second type united the upper with an insole, which was subsequently attached to an out-sole with a raised heel. This was the main variety, and was used for most footwear, including standard shoes and riding boots.

Romanian traditional shoemaking of opanak shoes, a type of moccasins

The traditional shoemaker would measure the feet and cut out upper leathers according to the required size. These parts were fitted and stitched together. The sole was next assembled, consisting of a pair of inner soles of soft leather, a pair of outer soles of firmer texture, a pair of welts or bands about one inch broad, of flexible leather, and lifts and top-pieces for the heels. The insole was then attached to a last made of wood, which was used to form the shoe. Some lasts were straight, while curved lasts came in pairs: one for left shoes, the other for right shoes. The 'lasting' procedure then secured the leather upper to the sole with tacks. The soles were then hammered into shape; the heel lifts were then attached with wooden pegs and the worn out-sole was nailed down to the lifts. The finishing operation included paring, rasping, scraping, smoothing, blacking, and burnishing the edges of soles and heels, scraping, sand-papering, and burnishing the soles, withdrawing the lasts, and cleaning out any pegs which may have pierced through the inner sole.

Other types of ancient and traditionally made shoes included furs wrapped around feet, and sandals wrapped over them (used by Romans fighting in northern Europe), and moccasins—simple shoes without the durability of joined shoes.

The patron saint of shoemakers is Saint Crispin.

The most common materials used to make shoes are leather, textiles (cotton, polyester, wool, and nylon), synthetics, rubber, and foam (open and closed cell foam). Leather is flexible and elastic but very sturdy and strong which makes it the top choice for shoe making.

=== Industrial era ===
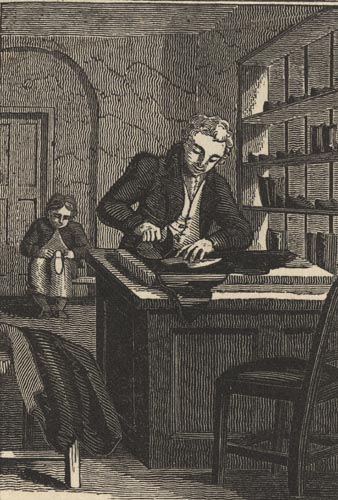
A shoemaker in the Georgian era, from The Book of English Trades, 1821.

Shoemaking became more commercialized in the mid-18th century, as it expanded as a cottage industry, typically organized around a central manufactory and subcontracted laborers organized into a putting-out system. Large warehouses began to stock footwear in warehouses, made by many small manufacturers from the area.

Until the 19th century, shoemaking was a traditional handicraft, but by the century's end, the process had been almost completely mechanized, with production occurring in large factories. Despite the obvious economic gains of mass production, the factory system produced shoes without the individual differentiation that the traditional shoemaker was able to provide.

The first steps towards mechanisation were taken during the Napoleonic Wars by the engineer, Marc Brunel. He developed machinery for the mass-production of boots for the soldiers of the British Army. In 1812 he devised a scheme for making nailed-boot-making machinery that automatically fastened soles to uppers by means of metallic pins or nails. With the support of the Duke of York, the shoes were manufactured, and, due to their strength, cheapness, and durability, were introduced for the use of the army. In the same year, the use of screws and staples was patented by Richard Woodman. Brunel's system was described by Sir Richard Phillips as a visitor to his factory in Battersea as follows:

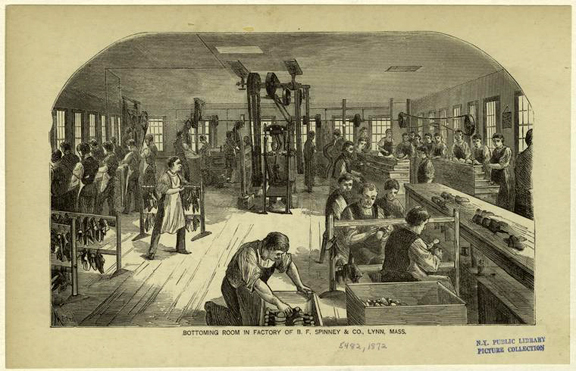
By the late 19th century, the shoemaking industry had migrated to the factory and was increasingly mechanized. Pictured, the bottoming room of the B. F. Spinney & Co. factory in Lynn, Massachusetts, 1872.

In another building I was shown his manufactory of shoes, which, like the other, is full of ingenuity, and, in regard to subdivision of labour, brings this fabric on a level with the oft-admired manufactory of pins. Every step in it is effected by the most elegant and precise machinery; while, as each operation is performed by one hand, so each shoe passes through twenty-five hands, who complete from the hide, as supplied by the currier, a hundred pairs of strong and well-finished shoes per day. All the details are performed by the ingenious application of the mechanic powers; and all the parts are characterised by precision, uniformity, and accuracy. As each man performs but one step in the process, which implies no knowledge of what is done by those who go before or follow him, so the persons employed are not shoemakers, but wounded soldiers, who are able to learn their respective duties in a few hours. The contract at which these shoes are delivered to Government is 6s. 6d. per pair, being at least 2s. less than what was paid previously for an unequal and cobbled article.

However, when the war ended in 1815, manual labour became much cheaper, and the demand for military equipment subsided. As a consequence, Brunel's system was no longer profitable and it soon ceased business.

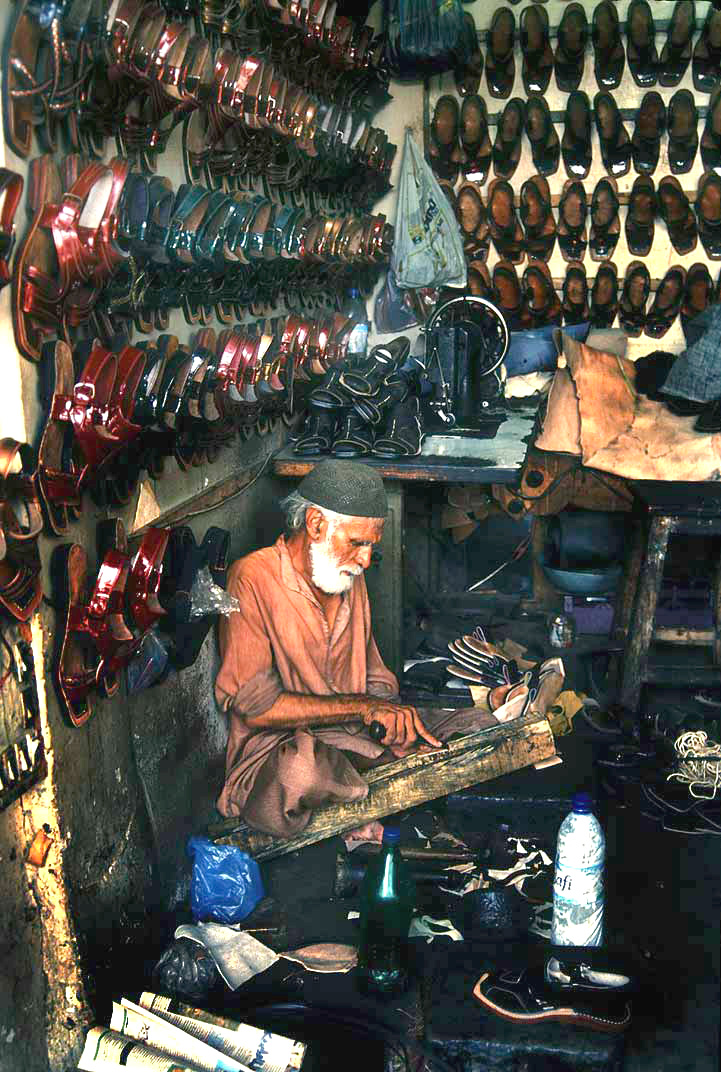
Traditional shoemakers still exist today, shoemaker in Karachi

Similar exigencies at the time of the Crimean War stimulated a renewed interest in methods of mechanization and mass-production, which proved longer-lasting. A shoemaker in Leicester, Tomas Crick, patented the design for a riveting machine in 1853. His machine used an iron plate to push iron rivets into the sole. The process greatly increased the speed and efficiency of production. He also introduced the use of steam-powered rolling-machines for hardening leather and cutting-machines, in the mid-1850s.

The sewing machine was introduced in 1846, and provided an alternative method for the mechanization of shoemaking. By the late 1850s, the industry was beginning to shift towards the modern factory, mainly in the US and areas of England. A shoe stitching machine was invented by the American Lyman Blake in 1856 and perfected by 1864. Entering into partnership with McKay, his device became known as the McKay stitching machine and was quickly adopted by manufacturers throughout New England. As bottlenecks opened up in the production line due to these innovations, more and more of the manufacturing stages, such as pegging and finishing, became automated. By the 1890s, the process of mechanisation was largely complete.

A process for manufacturing stitchless, that is, glued, shoes—AGO—was developed in 1910. Traditional shoemakers still exist today, especially in poorer parts of the world, and create custom shoes. Current crafters, in developing regions or supply constrained areas may use surplus car or truck tire tread sections as an inexpensive and plentiful material resource with which to make strong soles for shoes or sandals. Generally, the modern machinery used includes die cutting tools to cut the shapes and grommet machines to punch holes for lacing.

Early 21st century has seen a resurgence in the shoemaking profession, particularly in the United States, Australia and the United Kingdom. This has been driven in large part by broader societal preferences in favour of leather restoration rather than replacement and extends to not only shoes but also handbags and other leather fashion accessories. Meanwhile, organizations within the industry have begun leveraging e-commerce and modern logistical networks to offer consumers greater convenience through the offering of services by mail.

== Well-known shoemakers ==
- Bata, Czech footwear, apparel and fashion accessories manufacturer and retailer founded by Tomáš Baťa
- Berluti, French leather handmade shoe company founded by Alessandro Berluti
- Bontoni, Italian shoe brand founded by Franco Gazzani and Lewis Cutillo
- Carl Franz Bally, Swiss shoe manufacturing company founder
- Christian Louboutin, French shoe designer, his stiletto footwear incorporates shiny, red-lacquered soles that have become his signature
- Ed Meier, German shoemaking company, founded by Hans Mayr in 1596, it is the oldest existing shoemaking company in the world
- Edward Green, English shoemaker
- Giuseppe Zanotti, Italian footwear designer known for his sculptural, jeweled heels
- Jimmy Choo, Malaysian Chinese shoe designer based in London
- John Lobb, English shoemaker and the founder of the company John Lobb Bootmaker
- Manolo Blahnik, Spanish shoe designer, founder of the eponymous high-end shoe brand
- Mister Minit, British shoe repair & key welding corporation
- Rainbow Cobblers, 1970s American hippy shoe and boot designer in San Francisco, California
- Rene Caovilla, Italian shoe designer
- Roger Vivier, French shoe designer, his best-known creation was the stiletto heel
- Rupert Sanderson, British shoe designer who was born in Penang, Malaysia
- Salvatore Capezio, founder of the manufacturer of dance shoes Capezio
- Salvatore Ferragamo, Italian shoe designer
- Santoni, Italian shoe and leather brand founded by Andrea Santoni
- Sergio Rossi, Italian shoe designer
- Stefano Bemer, Italian shoemaker, based in Florence
- Wildsmith, English footwear manufacturer founded by Matthew Wildsmith and Rebecca Wildsmith, their grandson Raymond Lewis Wildsmith invented the loafer design

== Shoe store ==
A shoe store or shoe shop is a type of retailer that specializes in selling shoes. From slippers to athletic shoes to boots, the store could also sell shoe accessories, including insoles, shoelaces, shoe horns, shoe polish, etc. In addition, shoe stores may provide clothing and fashion accessories, such as handbags, sunglasses, backpacks, socks, and hosiery.

A shoe repair shop is a type of business establishment that fixes and remodels shoes and boots. Besides a shoe repair shop, a shoe repairer could work in department stores or shoe stores.

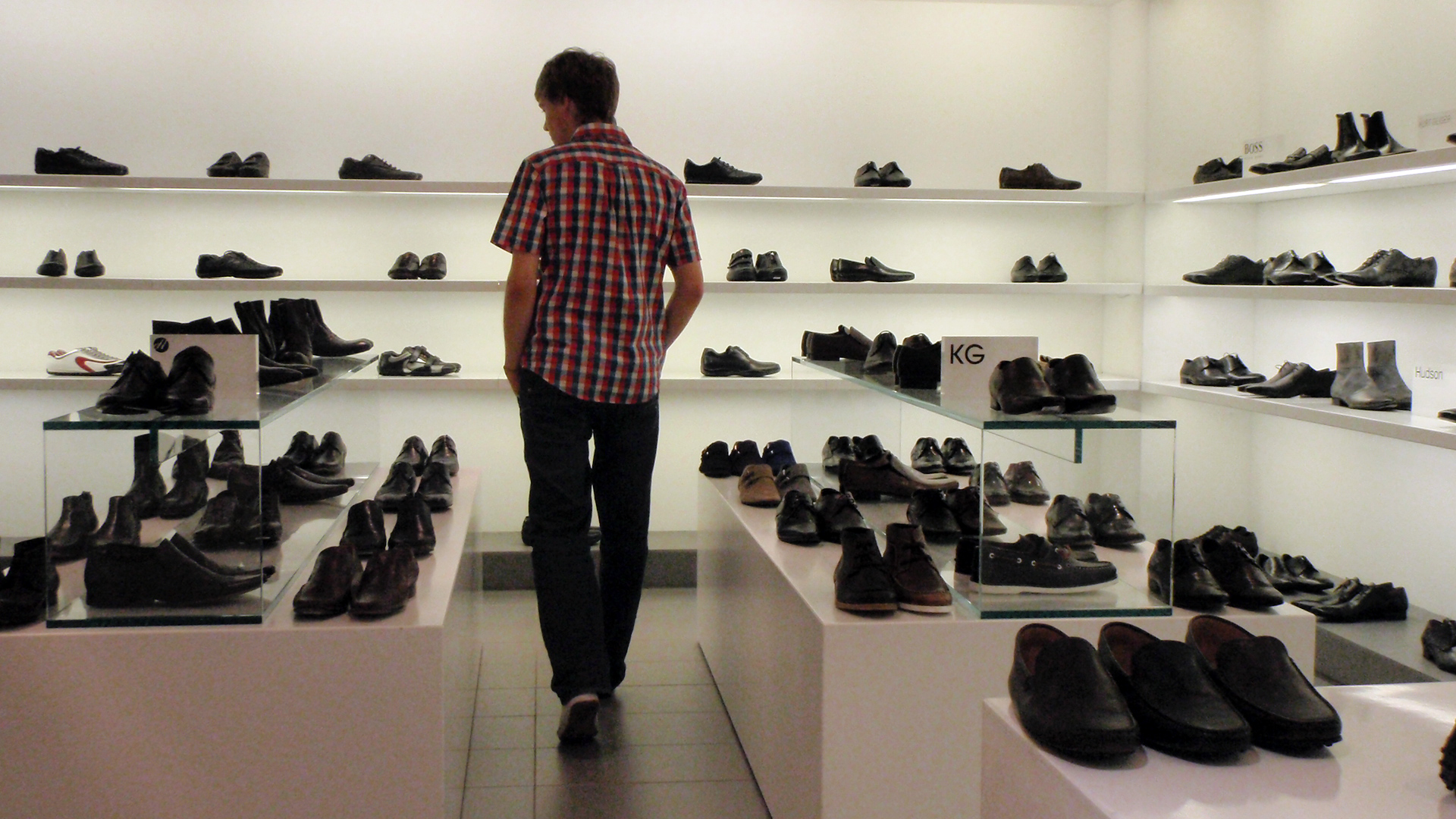
Men's shoes on display in a shopping outlet.

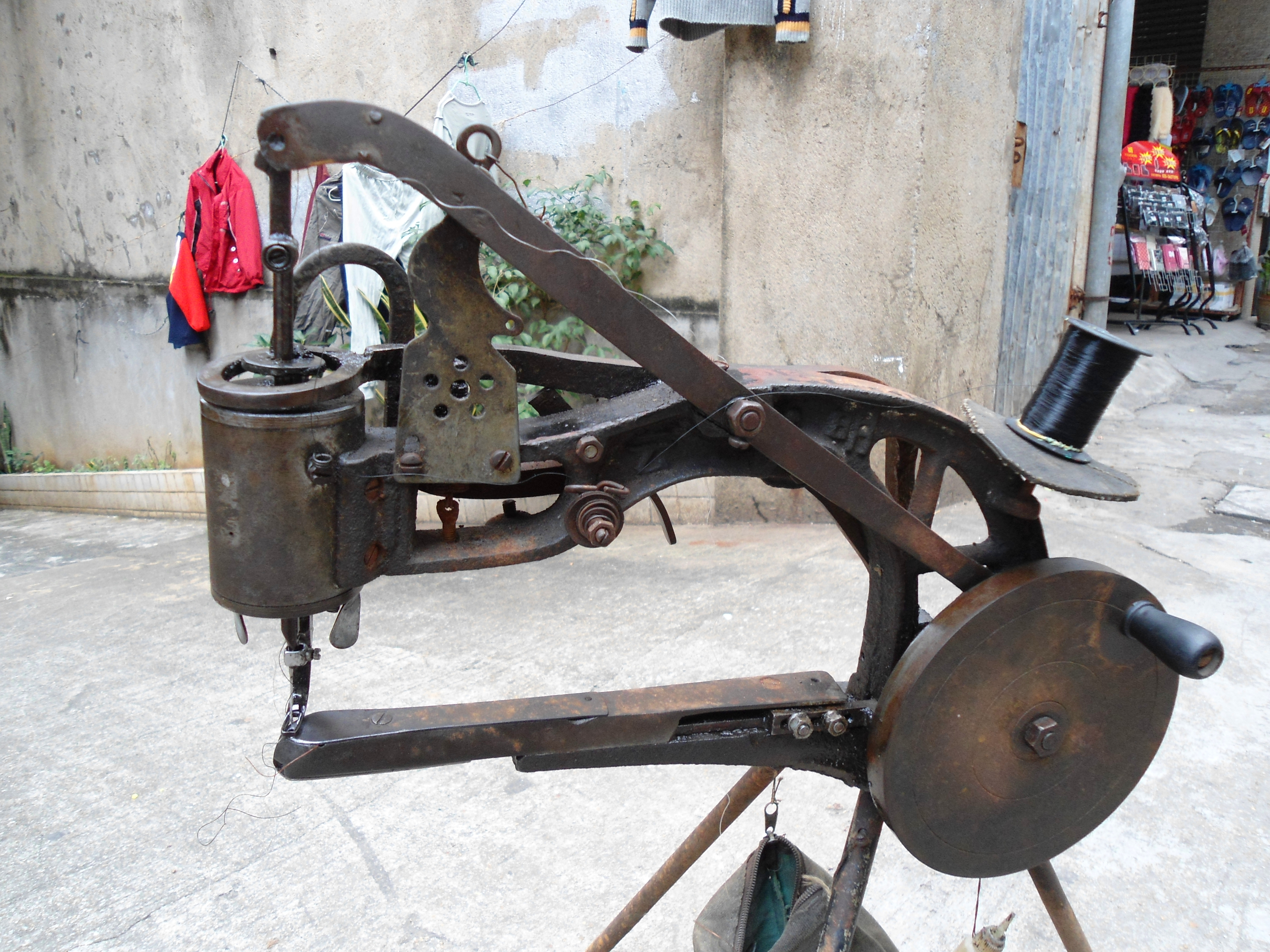
Sewing machine for shoemaking, shoe repair, and bag and heavy fabric repair work. This machine is manually operated with a hand crank. The foot can be turned in any direction which changes the direction of the material feed.

== See also ==
- Cordwainer
- Daughters of St. Crispin, an American labour union of female shoemakers, and the first national women's labour union in the United States
- List of shoe styles
- Load of old cobblers, slang term
- Order of the Knights of St. Crispin, an American labor union of 50,000 shoemakers c. 1870
