= Ago =

Ago or AGO may refer to:

== Organizations ==
- AGO Flugzeugwerke, a German aircraft manufacturer
- Alpha Gamma Omega, a national, Christ-Centered fraternity
- American Guild of Organists
- Art Gallery of Ontario
- Australian Geospatial-Intelligence Organisation
- United States Army Adjutant General's Corps or A.G.O.

== People ==
- Ago Anderson (born 1972), Estonian actor
- Ago Künnap (born 1941), Estonian linguist
- Ago Luberg (born 1983), Estonian computer scientist
- Ago Markvardt (born 1969), Estonian skier
- Ago Neo (1908–1982), Estonian wrestler
- Ago of Friuli, 7th-century Duke of Friuli
- Agó Páez (born 1954), Uruguayan plastic artist
- Ago Pajur (born 1962), Estonian historian
- Ago Roo (born 1946), Estonian actor
- Ago Ruus (born 1949). Estonian film cinematographer and director
- Ago Silde (born 1963), Estonian politician
- Ago-Endrik Kerge (1939–2021), Estonian ballet dancer, ballet master, director and actor
- Agostino Carollo, Italian musician who released records as "Ago"
- Petrit Ago, Albanian civil servant
- Daniel Asama Ago, Nigerian politician
- Roberto Ago (1907–1995), Italian jurist

== Places ==
- Ago Bay, a bay in Japan
- Ago-Oba, electoral district in Nigeria
- Ago, Mie, a town in Japan
- Angola, ISO 3166-1 alpha-3 country code
- Art Gallery of Ontario
- Magnolia Municipal Airport in Arkansas, US (IATA airport code AGO)

== Science and technology ==
- AGO system, a manufacturing process for making stitchless shoes
- Argonaute proteins (AGO)
- Silver(I,III) oxide (Ag_{4}O_{4} or AgO)
- Silver(I) oxide (Ag_{2}O)

== Other uses ==
- Ag-o (악어), a 1996 South Korean film
- Attorney General of Ohio
- Attorney General of Oklahoma
- Attorney General of Ontario
- Attorney General of Oregon
- Attorney General's Office
- Auditor General of Ontario
- Operation A-Go (あ号作戦), Japanese plans for the Battle of the Philippine Sea during World War Two
- Tainae language

== See also ==
- AGOS (Auxiliary General Ocean Surveillance Ship) of the US Navy; see Ocean Surveillance Ship
- Agos (TV series), Philippine TV series
- Agos, Armenian newspaper from Turkey
