= Cordwainers' Hall =

Former livery hall in the City of London

Coordinates: 51.5130°N 0.0963°W

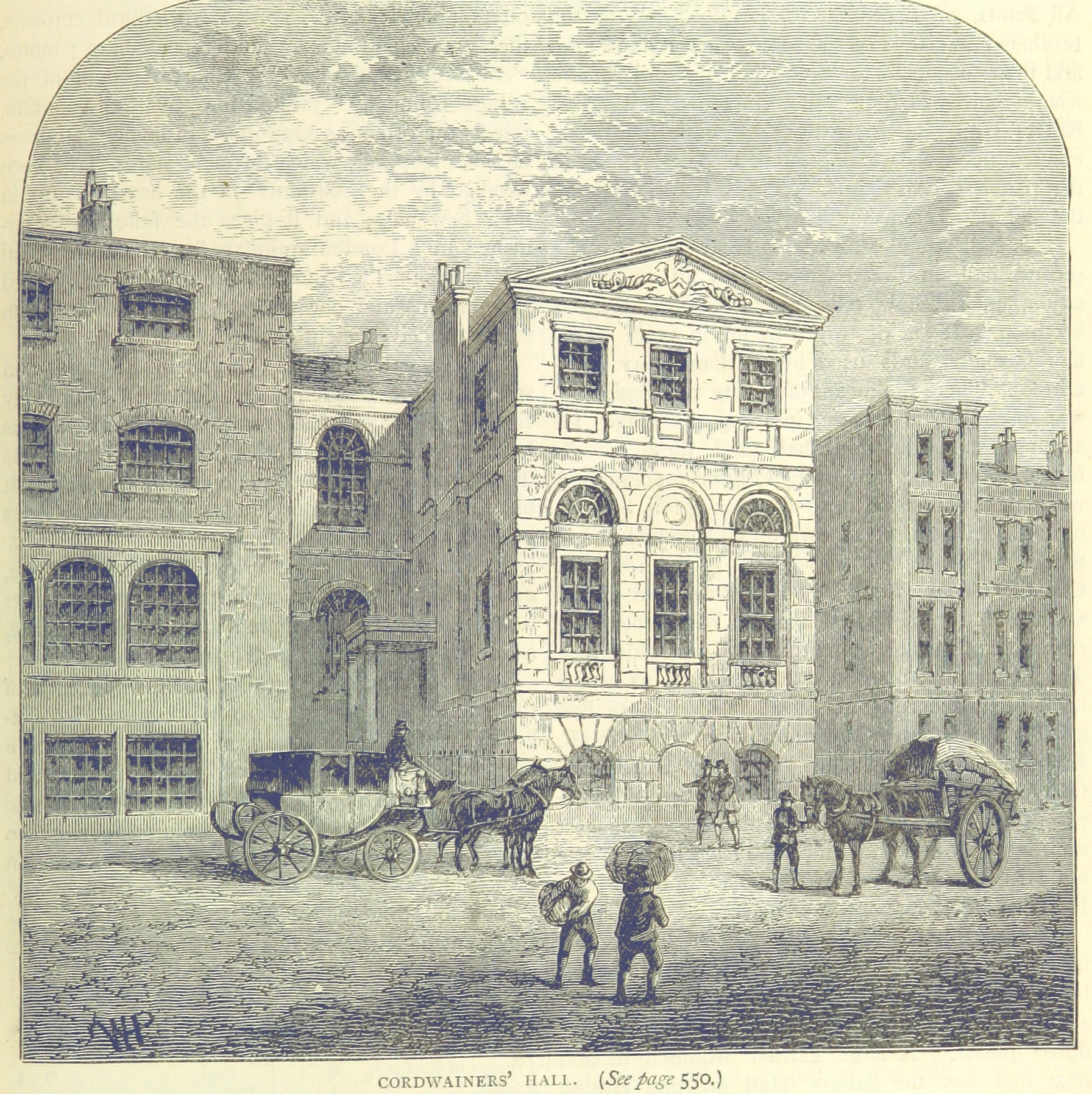
1873 illustration of Cordwainers' Hall from George Walter Thornbury's "Old and New London"

Cordwainers' Hall was the livery hall of the Worshipful Company of Cordwainers, the City of London livery company for Cordwainers (workers in fine leather) from 1316 until its destruction in 1941.

The hall stood in St. Paul's Churchyard, facing Cannon Street. Five successive halls were built on the site, the last three were rebuilt in 1670, 1788, and 1910. A plaque marks the site. The 1788 hall was built by Sylvanus Hall of nr.8 Paternoster Row, with the front of the hall decorated in stone by Robert Adam. The front of the hall featured a stone medallion of a "country girl spinning with a distaff...and of the thread of cordwainers or shoemakers." The arms of the Cordwainers company was in the pediments of the building.

The building also had a ballroom. The description says it was a 20 x 10 m - a surprisingly substantial room for a City livery hall. It was a neat room but not overly ornamented. The hall was entered through two side wings reached by a short flight of steps. There was also a music gallery/orchestra area above the entrance with representations of musical instruments beneath it. So imagine a long rectangular Georgian room with the Company's heraldry and insignia of Crown and City providing the principal visual decoration. It would have been perfectly suitable for company dinners, entertainments and musical performances incl. receptions and corporate celebrations. It wasn't simply a hall where leather craftsmen met, it was effectively the Company's Corporate Headquarters, administrative centre and a ceremonial/social building.

Sylvanus Hall (B.1730–D.1792) of nr.8 Paternoster Row (St.Paul's) was a London carpenter/builder who ultimately held the title of London City Carpenter, rather than as an architect in the modern professional sense. He was born at Tickhill, Yorkshire (22.Nov.1730) to John Hall, a wheelwright. He established himself in London and became a Freeman of the City in 1767. He was employed as a skilled currier and designer at "Gunnell's Hat Warehouse" from 1765 and at "Three Hatts" under Ann (Gunnell) Rozea.

Sylvanus Hall bachelor, married (02.Feb.1769) Ann Gunnell (B.1746-D.1774) at St Augustine, Watling Street who was the daughter of Henry (Robert) Gunnell Esq. (House of Commons) & Ann Rozea of James Street, Covent Garden. But then Ann (jnr.) died (30.Apr.1774) at nr.8 Paternoster Row only five years after their marriage (at age 28 yrs.) of birth complications.

By 1771 Sylvanus had left the fashion industry and was serving as a Common Councilman for Farringdon Within, and (1784–1792) held the important position of London City Carpenter. That makes him a considerably more substantial figure than the rather obscure "architect" description initially given.

There is a strong possibility that Henry Robert Gunnell's position and connections within Parliament provided Sylvanus Hall with access to influential government and parliamentary circles. If Gunnell was the father-in-law of a London builder who became City Carpenter in 1784, the possibility of introductions and patronage is entirely reasonable. So by 1784 Sylvanus had three overlapping networks - the Gunnell family and parliament - the City of London with Sylvanus Hall connected to the City Corporation and its building profession.

That is precisely the sort of network through which 18th-Century commissions could be generated. The key point is that Sylvanus Hall was not merely an architect/building/contractor who just happened to receive the Cordwainers' commission. He was directly connected by marriage to the influential Gunnell family.

Hall was also actively undertaking other significant building projects during this period. For example, the Barber-Surgeons' records show him negotiating in 1783 to demolish their theatre and construct two new buildings, and identifying himself as "Sylvanus Hall of Paternoster Row, Carpenter."

Hall's metoric rise to City Carpenter occurred only after his wife's death, but he had already entered the Gunnell family network. That could be significant when examining how the Gunnells interacted with London's government property contracts, building projects and City networks.

Sylvanus Hall died (23.Nov.1792) aged 62 from what a surviving record describes as an asthmatic complaint. He was buried at St Faith's beneath St Paul's Cathedral (29.Nov.1792). His career therefore spans almost the entire period of Georgian London from the 1760s through the great building boom of the 1770s and 1780s.

The hall was destroyed during World War II in the London blitz, on 10–11 May 1941.
