= Agos (disambiguation) =

Agos may refer to:

- Agos, a weekly Turkish Armenian newspaper published in Istanbul, Turkey
- Agos (TV series), a Filipino TV series
- A US Navy hull classification symbol: Ocean surveillance ship (AGOS)

== See also ==
- AGO (disambiguation)
