= Cordwainer =

Person who makes shoes

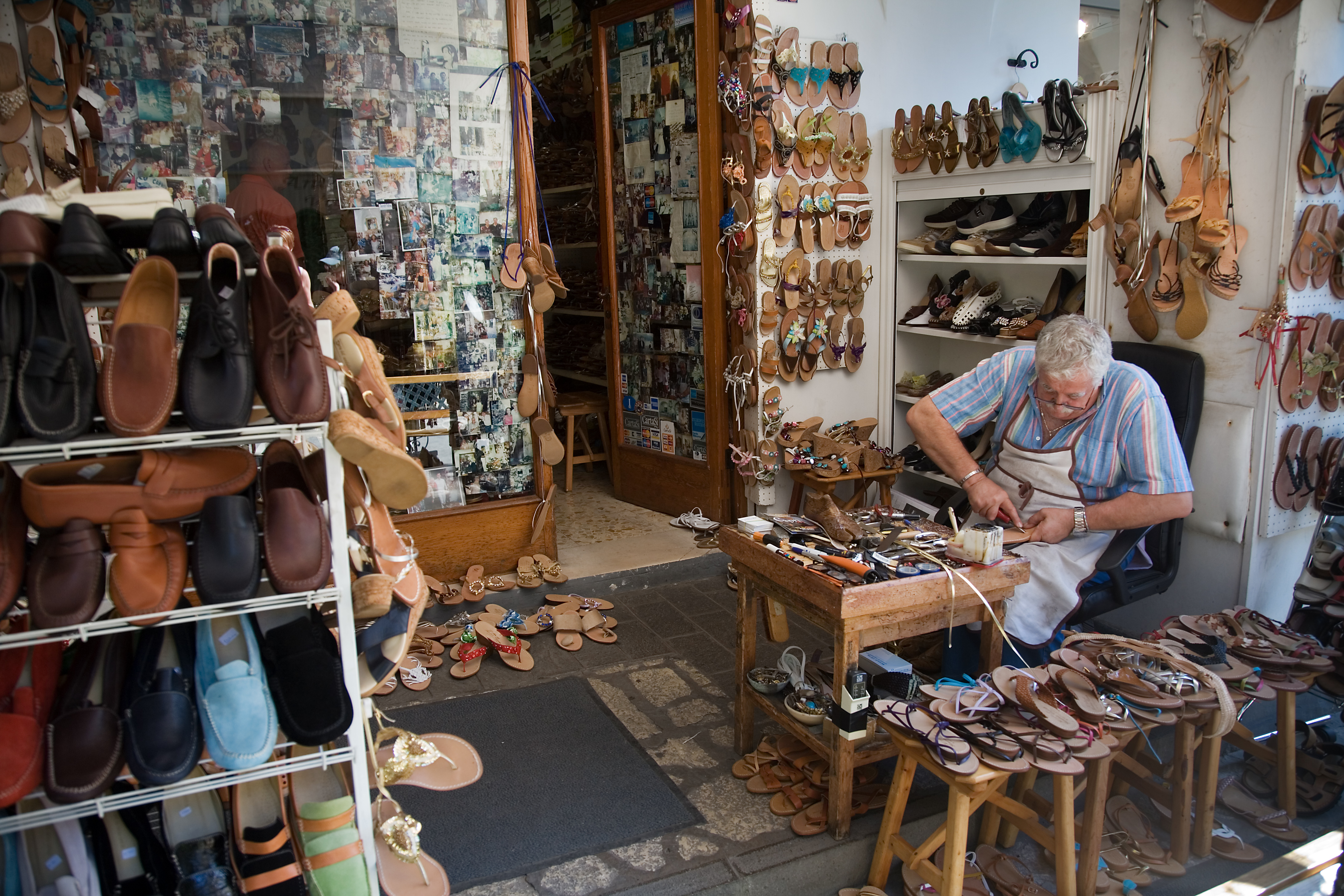
A cordwainer making shoes, Capri, Italy

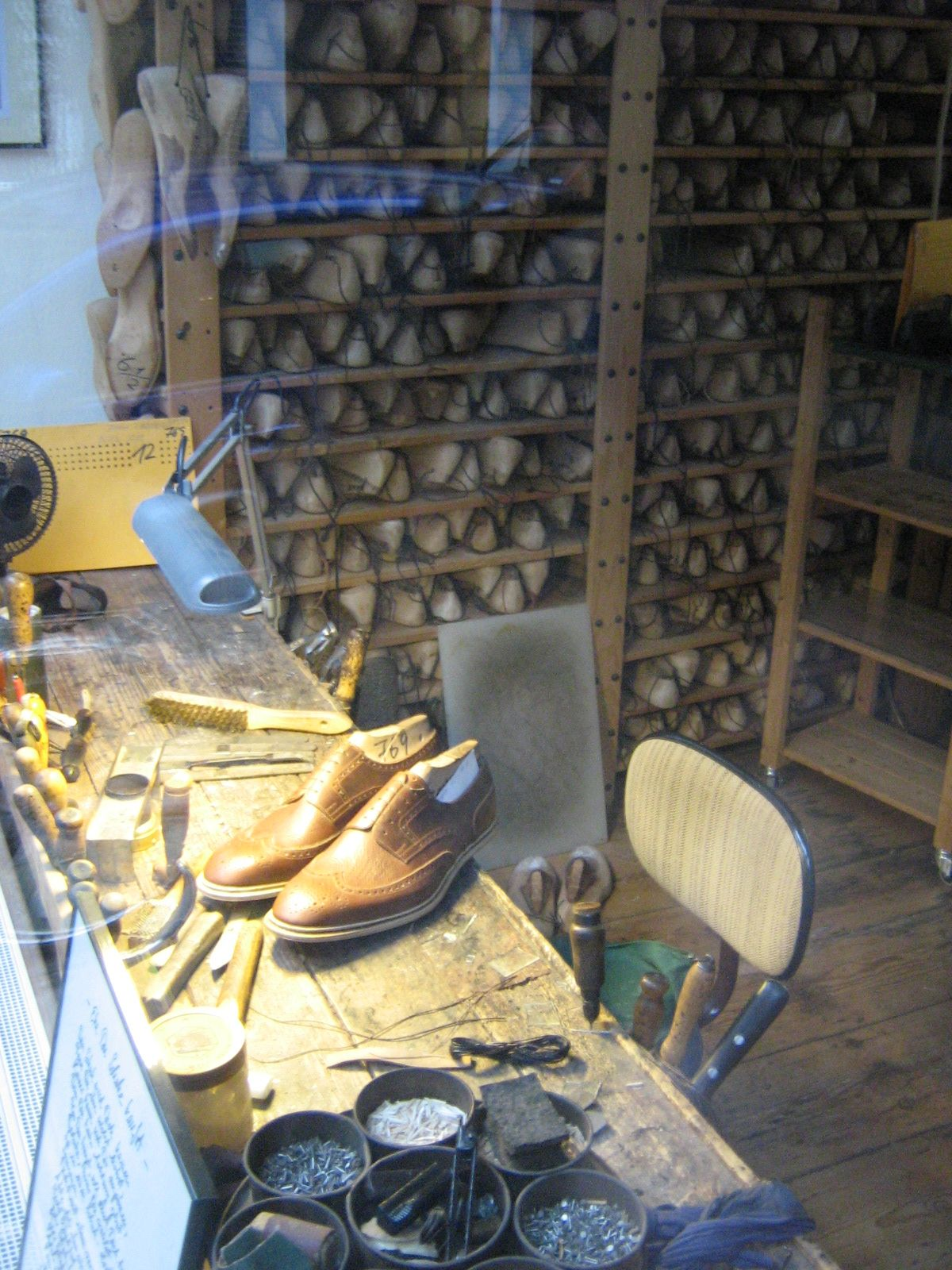
A cordwainer's desk in Hamburg, in the background a shelf with lasts

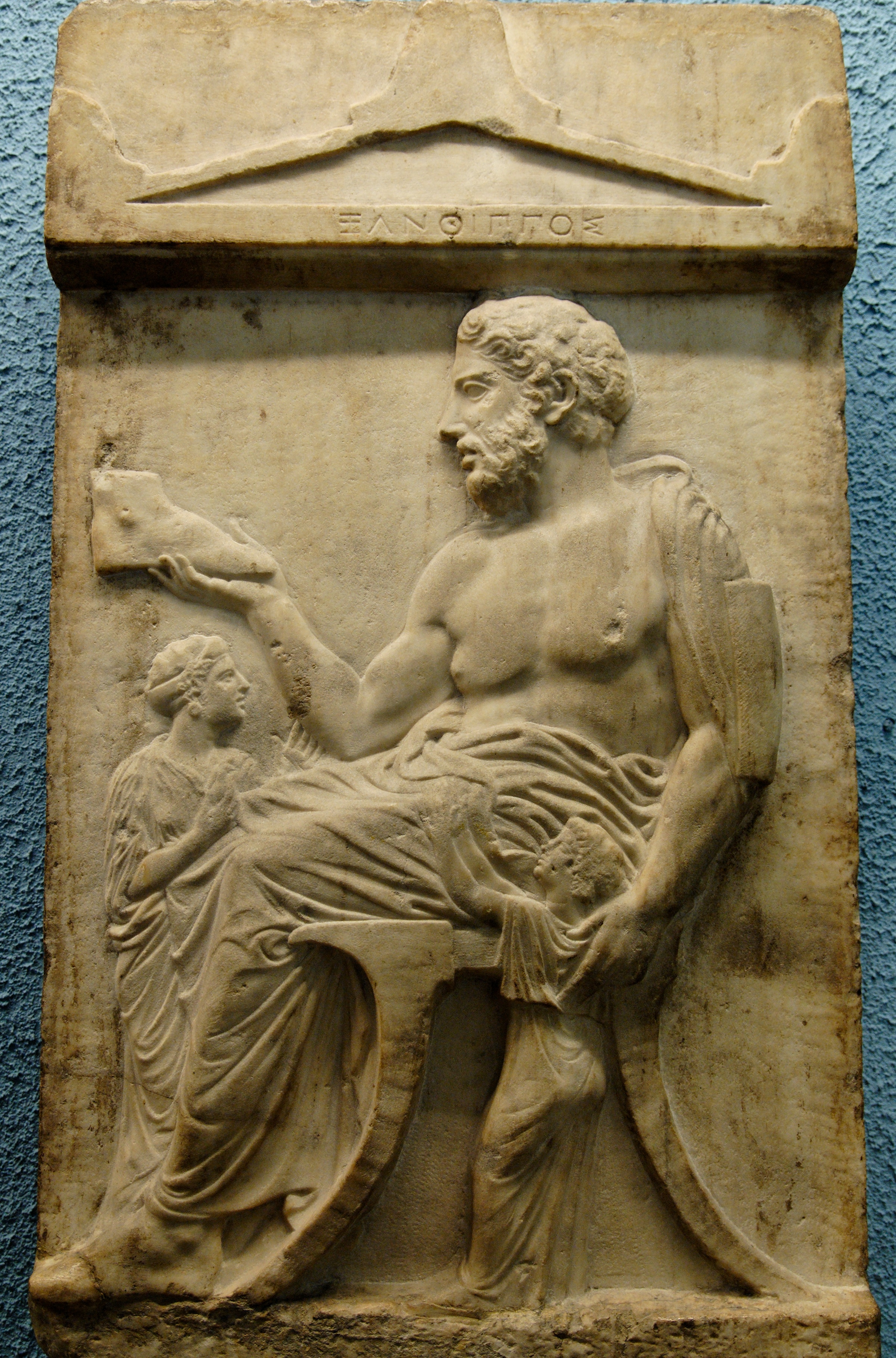
Tombstone of the shoemaker Xanthippos. Marble, Greek artwork, ca. 430–420 BC. From Athens.

A cordwainer (/ˈkɔːrdˌweɪnər/) is a shoemaker who makes new shoes from new leather. The cordwainer's trade can be contrasted with the cobbler's trade, according to a tradition in Britain that restricted cobblers to repairing shoes. This usage distinction is not universally observed, as the word cobbler is widely used for tradespeople who make or repair shoes.

The Oxford English Dictionary classifies the word cordwainer as archaic, but "still used in the names of guilds, for example, the Cordwainers' Company"; but its definition of cobbler mentions only mending, reflecting the older distinction. Play 14 of the Chester Mystery Plays was presented by the guild of corvisors, glossed as "shoemakers".

== Etymology ==
The term cordwainer entered English as cordewaner(e), from the Anglo-Norman cordewaner (from Old French cordoanier, -ouanier, -uennier, etc.), and initially denoted a worker in cordwain or cordovan, the leather historically produced in Moorish Córdoba, Spain, in the Middle Ages, as well as, more narrowly, a shoemaker. The earliest attestation in English is a reference to "Randolf se cordewan[ere]", ca. 1100.

According to the OED, the term is now considered obsolete except where it persists in the name of a trade-guild or company, or where otherwise employed by trade unions.

== History ==
British tradition distinguishes the terms cordwainer and cobbler, restricting cobblers to repairing shoes. In this usage, a cordwainer is someone who makes new shoes using new leather, whereas a cobbler is someone who repairs shoes. Medieval cordwainers used cordovan leather for the highest-quality shoes, but cordwainers also used domestically produced leathers and were not solely producers of luxury footwear.

=== British Isles ===
In the historic London guild system, the cobblers and cordwainers formed separate guilds, and the cobblers were forbidden by the Mayor of London in 1395 from working in new leather, and cordwainers similarly forbidden to meddle with old shoes. Historically, cobblers also made shoes, but only using old leather recovered from discarded or repaired shoes. Today, many makers of bespoke shoes will also repair their own work, but shoe repairers are not normally in a position to manufacture new footwear.

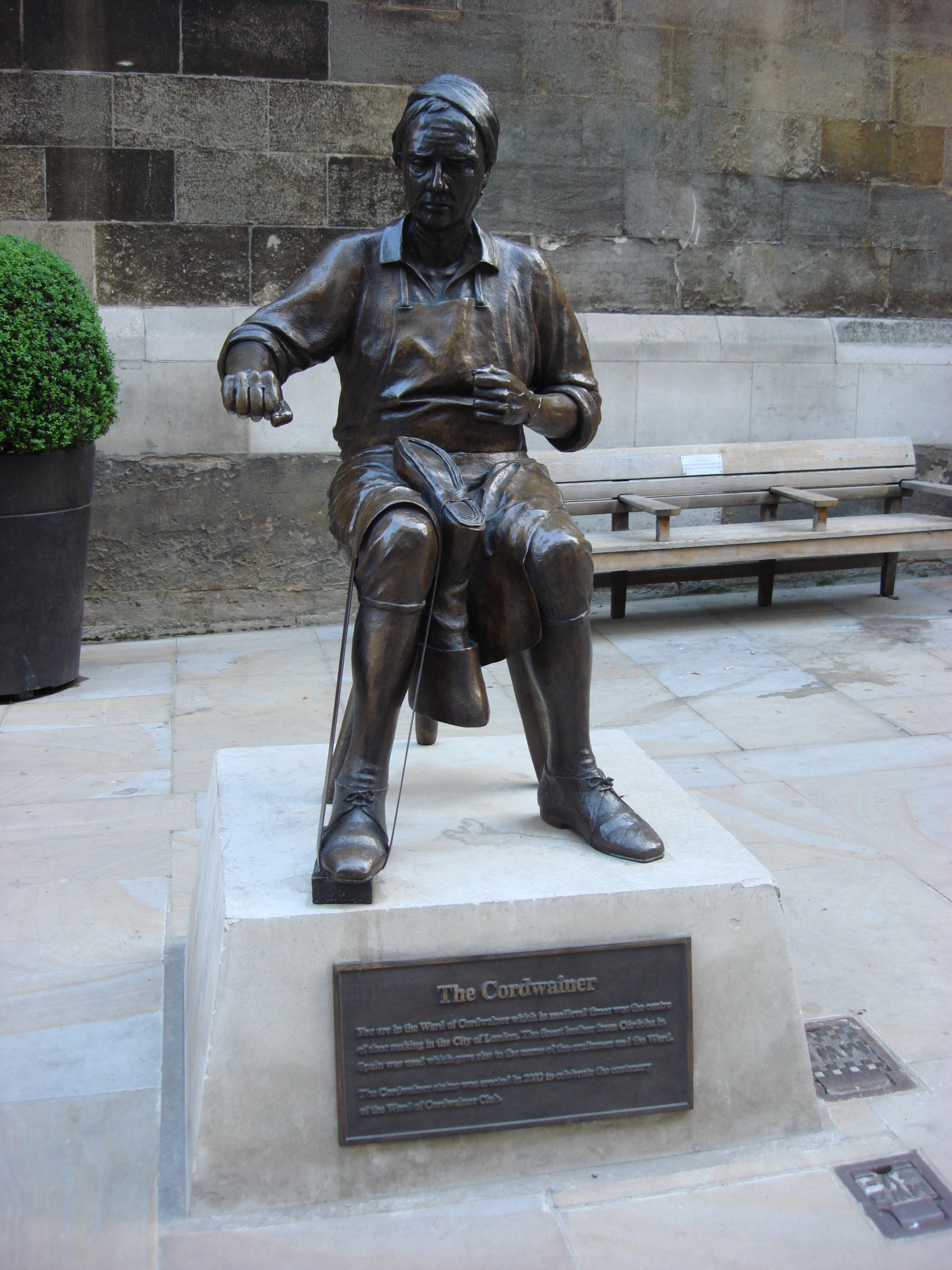
The Cordwainer statue in the Cordwainer of the City of London

In London, the guild of the Worshipful Company of Cordwainers historically controlled the occupation of cordwainer. Granted a royal charter of incorporation in 1439, the Guild had received its first ordinance in 1272. Historically, most of London's cordwainers lived and worked in the ward of the City of London named Cordwainer.

Until 2000 a Cordwainers' Technical College existed in London. For over a hundred years, the college had been recognised as one of the world's leading establishments for training shoemakers and leather workers. It produced some of the leading fashion designers, including Jimmy Choo (born 1948) and Patrick Cox (born 1963). In 2000 Cordwainers' College was absorbed into the London College of Fashion, the shoe-design and accessories departments of which have become "Cordwainers at London College of Fashion".

In Scotland, in 1722, the cordwainers petitioned "to be incorporated and separated from the shoe-makers or those who make single-soled shoes".

=== United States ===
Settlers who sailed to Virginia in 1607 to settle in Jamestown included cordwainers. By 1616 the secretary of Virginia reported that the leather- and shoe-trades were flourishing. Christopher Nelme, of England, was the earliest recorded named shoemaker in the American colonies; he sailed to Virginia from Bristol in 1619.

In 1620 the Pilgrims landed in Massachusetts near the site of modern Provincetown. Nine years later, in 1629, the first shoemakers arrived, bringing their skills with them.

In 1984 a group of shoemakers and historians founded the Honourable Cordwainers' Company as a modern guild; they drew up its charter in the following year. In 1987 the Company "incorporated as a non-profit, tax-exempt educational organization in the state of Virginia, the home of America's first shoemakers", and was granted official status through recognition by The Master of The Worshipful Company of Cordwainers, London, England.

=== Canada ===
The early settlers of Canada also included cordwainers. On 14 June 1749, the newly appointed Lieutenant Governor of Nova Scotia, Edward Cornwallis, arrived off Chebucto Head, Nova Scotia in the sloop-of-war HMS Sphinx with the objective of establishing the settlement now called Halifax. By 27 June, thirteen transport-ships following the Sphinx reached the harbour with the initial 2,576 British settlers – among them nineteen cordwainers.

== See also ==
- Daughters of St. Crispin, an American labor union of female shoemakers
- List of shoe styles
- Order of the Knights of St. Crispin, an American labor union of 50,000 shoemakers c. 1870
