= Mister Minit =

Company that offers various services and products on-site

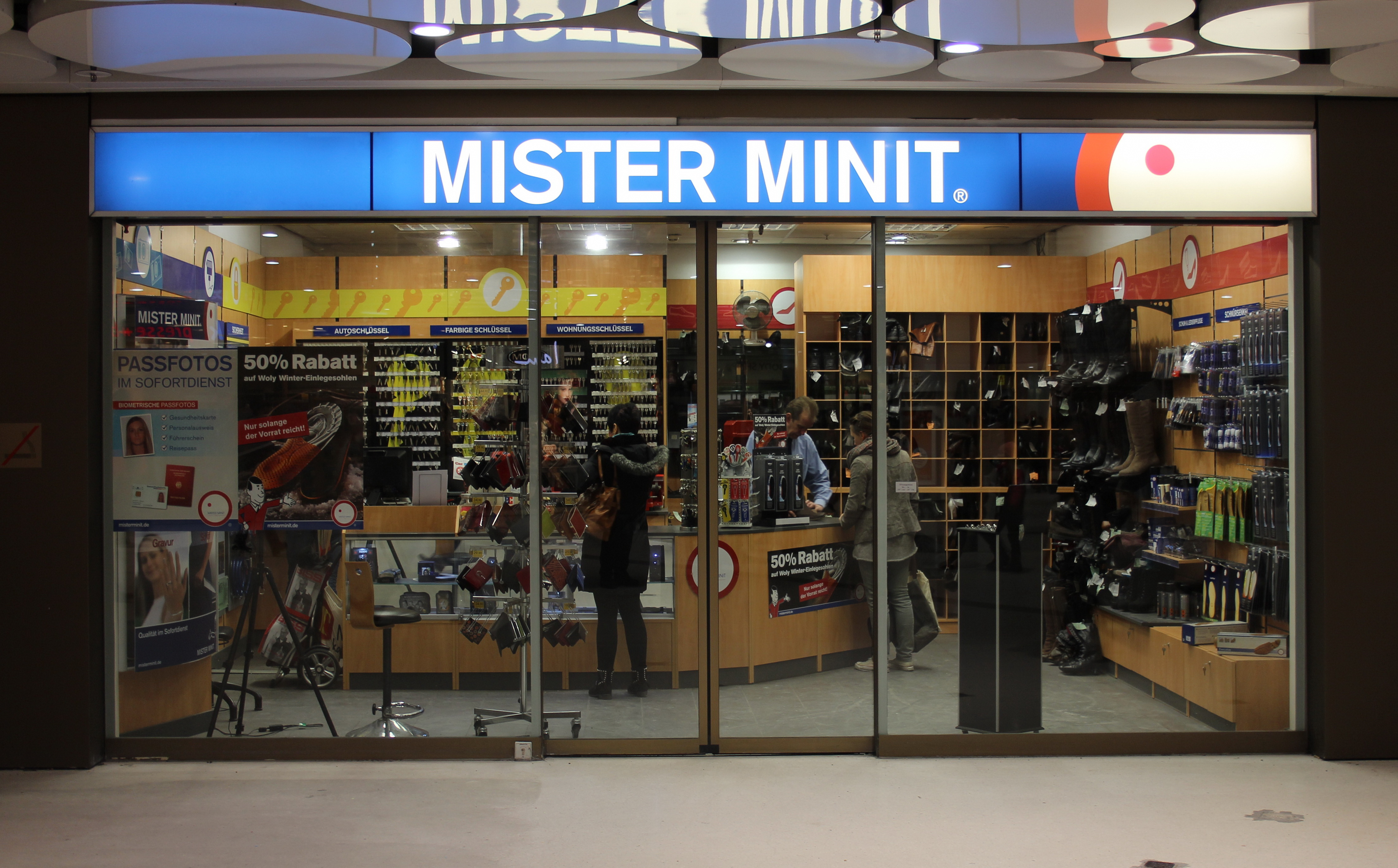
Mister Minit in Munich (Stachus underground level, 2013)

Mister Minit is an international company that offers various services and products on-site, founded in 1957. Its main focus is shoe repairs, and key cutting. A major shareholder since 2006 has been Howard Dyer. It has four regional headquarters: Erembodegem, Belgium (for Europe), Riverwood, New South Wales, Australia (for Oceania), Manchester, England (for UK) and Singapore.

== Founding ==
On 14 July 1957, Donald Hillsdon Ryan opened the first store in the Au Bon Marché department store in Brussels. According to company history, the heels of the then-fashionable high heels frequently broke on the cobblestone streets of Brussels’ old town. Traditional cobblers took up to ten days for a repair. This gave the Procter & Gamble marketing manager the idea for an instant service, which he implemented in a small space under the department store escalator. After a successful start, the concept of the Heel Bar was rolled out under the still-unprotected name Talon Minute (later Highheel-Bar) in department stores in Antwerp, Ghent, and Liège. The brand name Mister Minit was established in 1964, shortly followed by the symbol Fred, the Mister Minit man in a red coat.

== Expansion ==
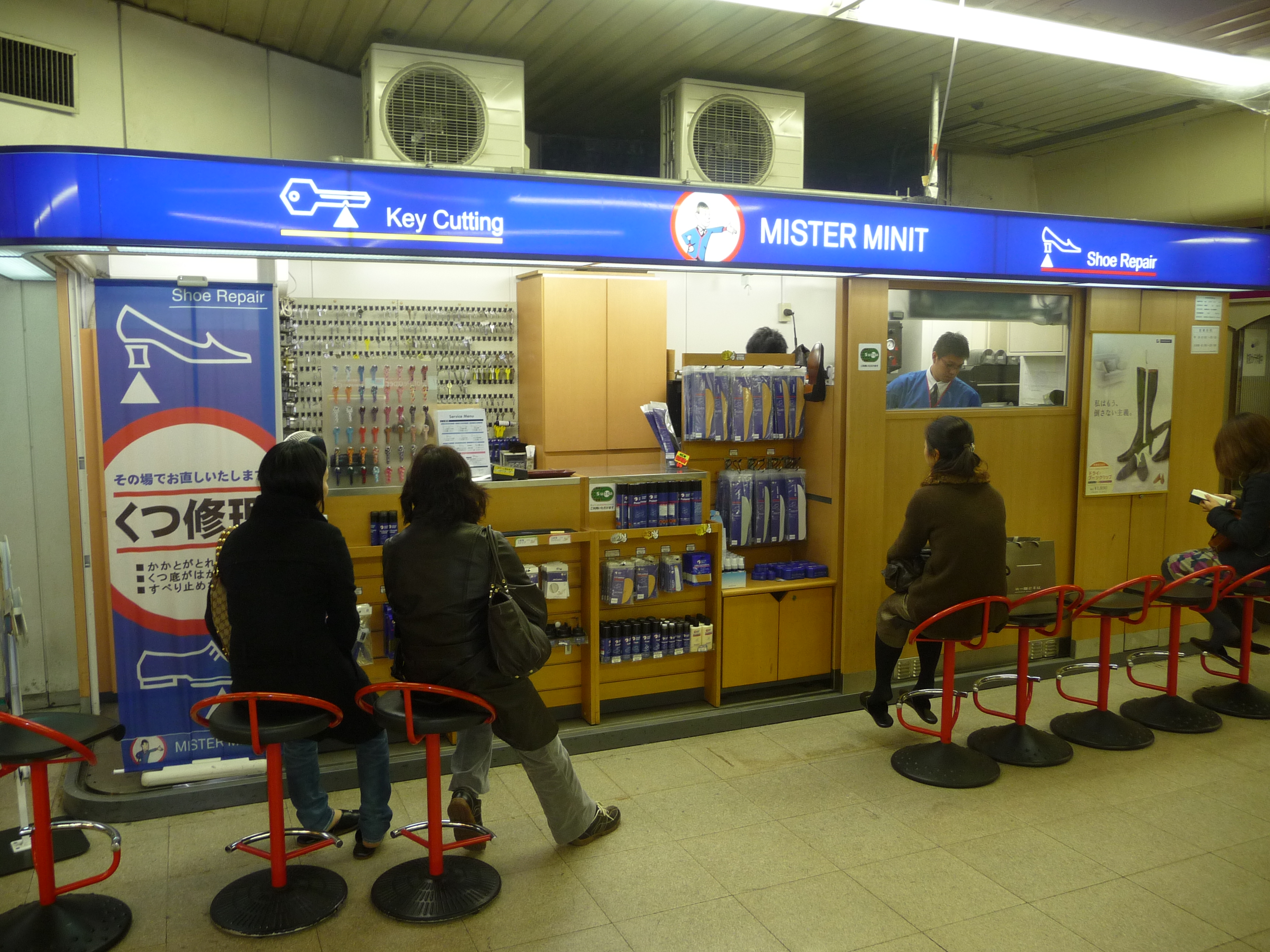
Mister Minit store in Japan (2008)

One year after its founding, the company expanded to France and Switzerland, and in 1959 launched in Germany. By 1966, Mister Minit had expanded across mainland Western Europe as well as Australia and New Zealand. In 1972, the first stores opened in Japan, followed by Britain and Norway in 1986. After the fall of the Eastern Bloc, the company expanded into the Czech Republic and Estonia (1996), Poland (2000), and Russia (2004). In 2006, the national Mister Minit businesses in Japan, Singapore, Australia, and New Zealand were sold. By 2007, there were 1,200 stores in over 16 countries in Europe and more than 2,000 service shops worldwide. The company reported a turnover of €150 million in Europe in 2011, with €30 million from Germany.

== Product range expansion ==
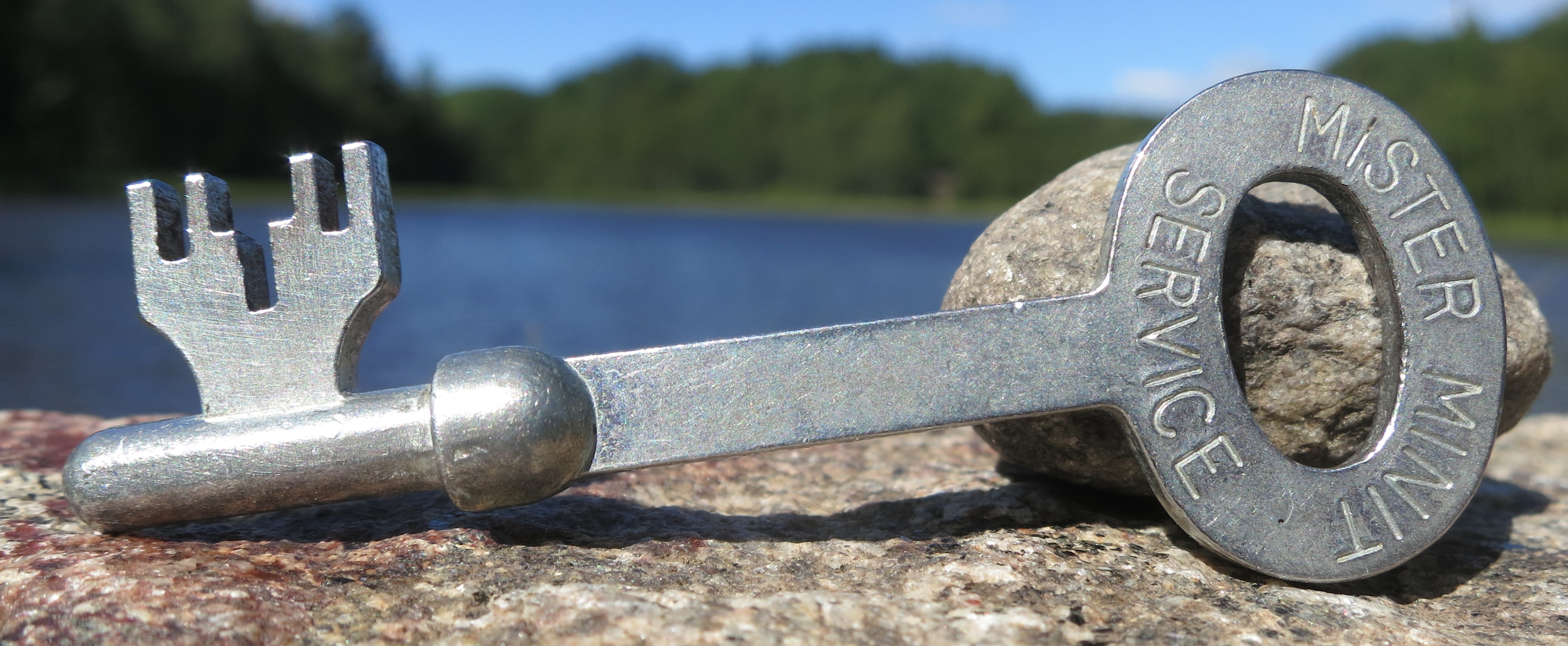
A 1970s duplicate key produced by Mister Minit

In 1960, key duplication and knife and ice skate sharpening were added as services. By the mid-1960s, engraving and watch repairs were introduced. From 1978, the company began producing rubber stamps. Later, services expanded to include sticker and photo services, sales of security technology and gift items, as well as the production of vehicle registration plates.

== Operations in Germany ==
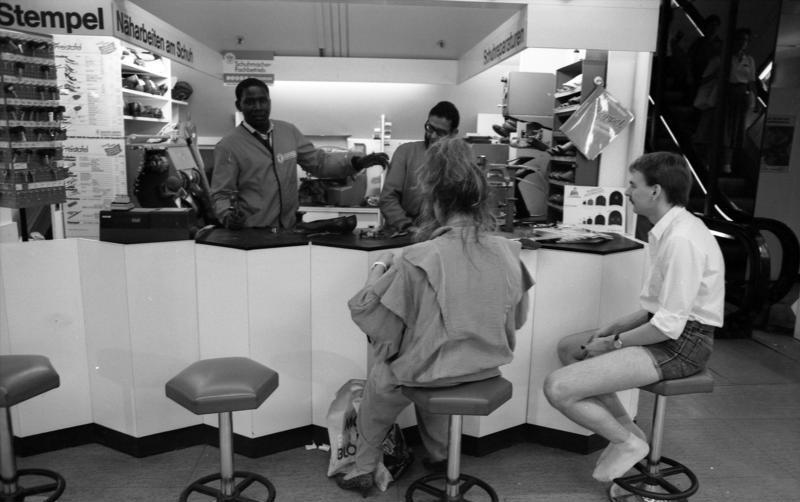
Mister Minit in Kaufhof, Bonn (1988)

Locations were primarily chosen following the original shop-in-shop concept, in department stores, shopping centres, and train stations. Before its insolvency, Mister Minit operated around 300 stores in Germany with approximately 500 employees, along with 51 additional partner shops. With 60 franchisees in Germany, Mister Minit was considered one of the leading franchise systems in the industry. The German headquarters was in Monheim am Rhein until 2010. From 2011, it moved to Düsseldorf. Mister Minit was one of the largest franchise companies in Germany. On 29 April 2020, it was announced that the company had filed for insolvency in self-administration due to the 2020 economic crisis. As part of the insolvency process, all stores in Germany closed in 2021.
