= Worshipful Company of Cordwainers =

Livery company of the City of London

Coordinates: 51.51144°N 0.08109°W

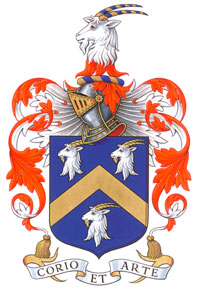
- Motto: Corio et Arte
- Location: c/o Saddlers House, Gutter Lane, London, EC2V 6BR
- Date of formation: 1272
- Company association: Leather industries
- Order of precedence: 27th
- Master of company: Jonathan Church (2024–2025)
- Website: www.cordwainers.org

The Worshipful Company of Cordwainers is one of the Livery Companies of the City of London. Cordwainers were workers in fine leather; the Company gets its name from "cordwain" (cordovan), the white leather produced from goatskin in Cordova, Spain. All fine leather makers, including Girdlers and Glovers, were originally classified as cordwainers; however, the term eventually came to refer only to fine leather footwear, including boots.

The Cordwainers' Company, which received the right to regulate City trade in 1272, obtained a Royal Charter of incorporation in 1439. The status of the Company as a trade association has lessened over the years; the Company is now, as are most other Livery Companies, a charitable body. Other leather-linked Livery Companies, which enjoy close relations with the Cordwainers include the Curriers, Leathersellers, Saddlers, Girdlers and Glovers.

The Company ranks twenty-seventh in the order of precedence of Livery Companies and is the highest ranked one without its own Livery Hall. The Company's motto is Corio et Arte, Latin for Leather and Art.

The livery hall of the Cordwainers, Cordwainers' Hall, though rebuilt several times, stood at the same site near St Paul's Churchyard from 1316 until its final destruction in the London blitz in 1941. The livery hall was not rebuilt after the war. However, a window was removed from the hall for safekeeping in 1939. Thus surviving the destruction of the hall in 1941, it was re-installed in the Holy Sepulchre church in London in 1973.
