= 1870 North Adams strike =

1870 strike in Massachusetts shoe factory

North Adams strike
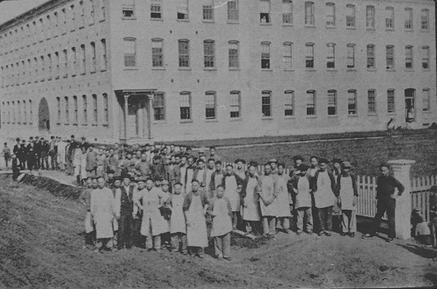
- "Chase's Chinamen"— Chinese workers
- Date: 1870
- Location: North Adams, Massachusetts; 42°42′7.44″N 73°6′49.97″W
- Goals: Eight-hour day
- Methods: Strikes, Protest, Demonstrations
- Result: Chinese immigrants brought in from California, replacing union workers for more competitive wages

Parties
Order of the Knights of St. Crispin	Mill management

Lead figures
Non-centralized leadership	Calvin T. Sampson George W. Chase

Casualties and losses
Arrests: 2	

The North Adams strike (also called North Adams Scandal) was a strike which began in April 1870 by shoe workers who were members of the Order of the Knights of St. Crispin, against Calvin T. Sampson's Shoe factory, in North Adams, Massachusetts, United States. The strike itself was broken when the factory superintendent, George W. Chase, fired the Irish workers, replacing them with newly employed seventy-five Chinese men brought to Massachusetts from California. Bringing national attention to North Adams, the event started a nation-wide trend of bringing in scab labor and helped perpetuate the concept of immigrants coming to the United States to steal jobs, which led to much hostility towards Chinese immigrants across the nation.

== Legacy ==
The incident sparked widespread working-class protest across the country, shaped legislative debate in Congress, and helped make Chinese immigration a sustained national issue. Twelve years later, the United States passed the Chinese Exclusion Act, barring most Chinese immigrants from entering the country. The Chinese Exclusion Act was the first major anti-immigration law in American history.

== Sources ==
- Anthony W. Lee (2008). A Shoemaker's Story: Being Chiefly about French Canadian Immigrants, Enterprising Photographers, Rascal Yankees, and Chinese Cobblers in a Nineteenth-Century Factory Town. Princeton University Press. ISBN 9780691133256.
