= Crispin and Crispinian =

3rd-century Christian martyrs and saints

Saints Crispin and Crispinian
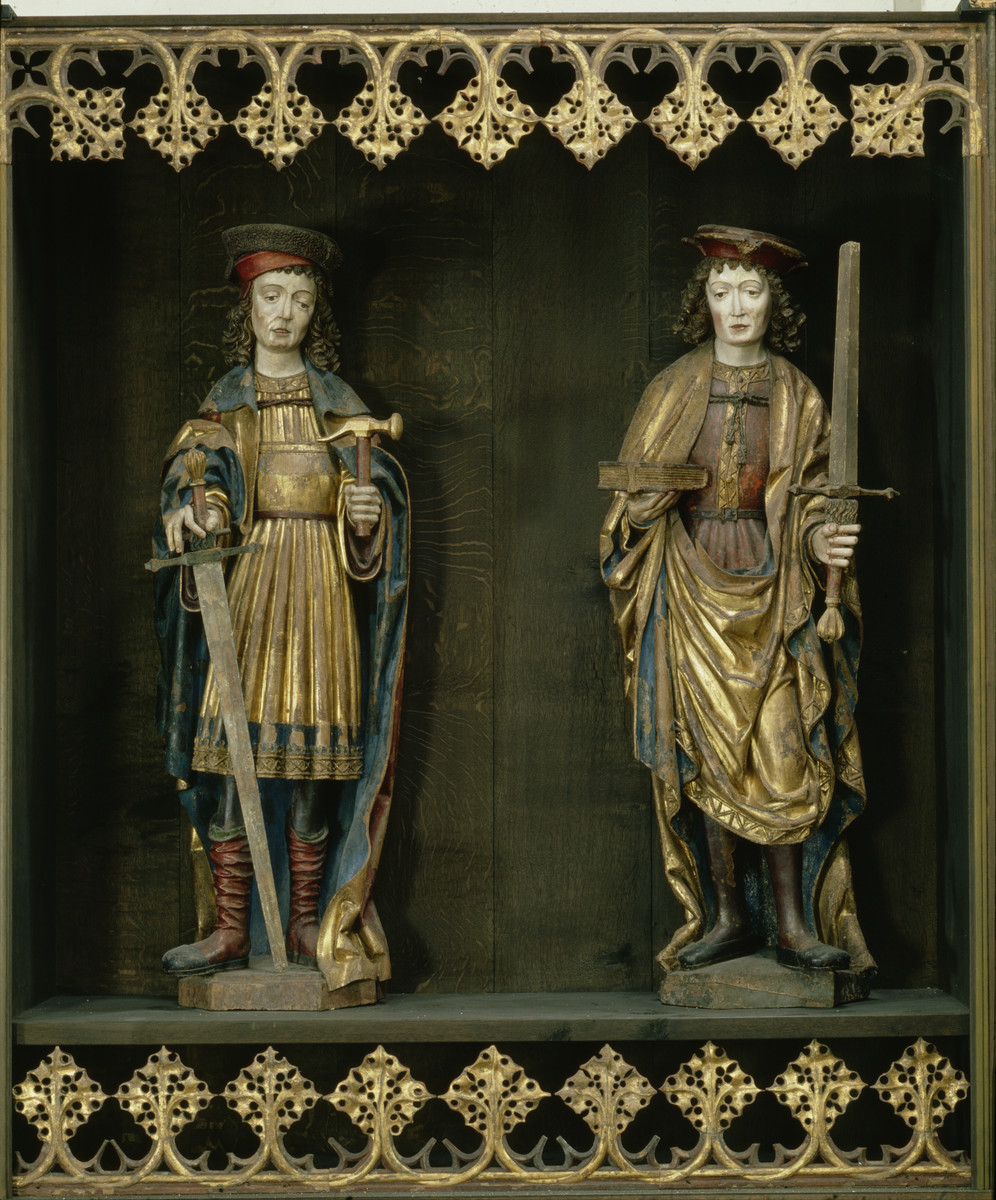
- SS. Crispin and Crispinian

Martyrs at Rome
- Born: 3rd century AD
- Died: 285 or 286; Rome
- Venerated in: Catholic Church; Eastern Orthodox Church; Church of England
- Canonized: Pre-Congregation
- Major shrine: Soissons
- Feast: October 25
- Attributes: depicted holding shoes
- Patronage: cobblers; curriers; glove makers; lace makers; lace workers; leather workers; saddle makers; saddlers; shoemakers; tanners; weavers. San Crispin, San Pablo City, Philippines

Saints Crispin and Crispinian are the Christian patron saints of cobblers, curriers, tanners, and leather workers. They were beheaded during the reign of Diocletian; the date of their execution is given as 25 October 285 or 286.

== Story ==
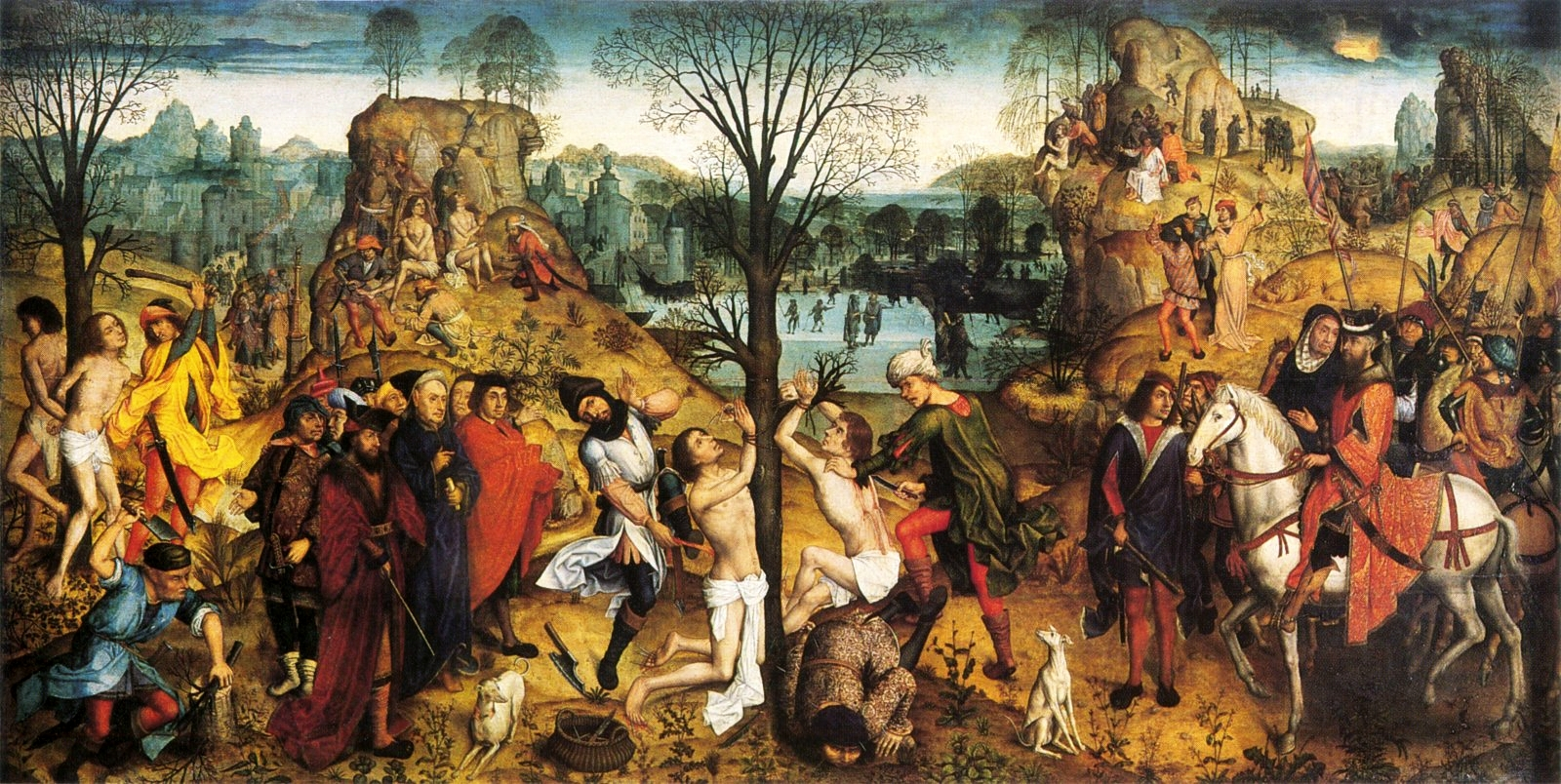
The Martyrdom of Saints Crispin and Crispinian by Aert van den Bossche, 1494

Born to a noble Roman family in the 3rd century AD, Crispin and Crispinian fled persecution for their faith, ending up at Soissons (modern-day France), where they preached Christianity to the Gauls while making shoes by night. It is stated that they were twin brothers.

They earned enough by their trade to support themselves and aid people experiencing poverty. Their success attracted the ire of Rictus Varus, Roman governor of Belgic Gaul, who had them tortured and thrown into the river with millstones around their necks. Though they survived, they were beheaded by the emperor c. 286.

== Veneration ==
The feast day of Saints Crispin and Crispinian is 25 October. Although this feast was removed from the Roman Catholic Church's universal liturgical calendar following the Second Vatican Council, the two saints are still commemorated on that day in the most recent edition of the Roman Church's martyrology.

In the sixth century, a stately basilica was erected over these saints' graves at Soissons, and St. Eligius, a famous goldsmith, made a costly shrine for the head of St. Crispinian. Their remains were afterwards removed by Charlemagne, partly to Osnabrück and partly to the church of San Lorenzo in Panisperna in Rome.

They are the patron saints of cobblers, glove makers, lace makers, lace workers, leather workers, saddle makers, saddlers, shoemakers, tanners, and weavers. Especially in France, but also in England and other parts of Europe, the festival of St Crispin was for centuries the occasion of solemn processions and merry-making, in which guilds of shoemakers took the chief part. Crispin and Crispinian are remembered in the Church of England with a commemoration on 25 October.

== Cultural references ==
The Battle of Agincourt was fought on Saint Crispin's feastday. (The English tradition placed the twins at Canterbury rather than Gaul.) Shakespeare's St. Crispin's Day Speech (sometimes called the "Band Of Brothers" Speech) from his play Henry V has immortalized the day. Also, for the Midsummer's Day Festival in the third act of Die Meistersinger, Wagner has the shoemakers' guild enter singing a song of praise to St. Crispin.

A 16th-century legend links them to the town of Faversham, Kent, England. A plaque at Faversham commemorates their association with the town. They are also celebrated in the name of the old pub "Crispin and Crispianus" at Strood in Kent.

== See also ==
- St Crispin Street Fair
- Daughters of St. Crispin
- Order of the Knights of St. Crispin
- City livery companies
