= Sergio Rossi =

Italian shoe designer company

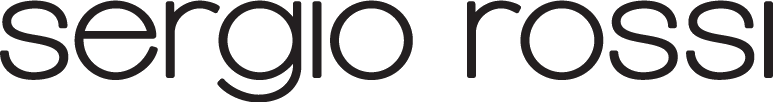

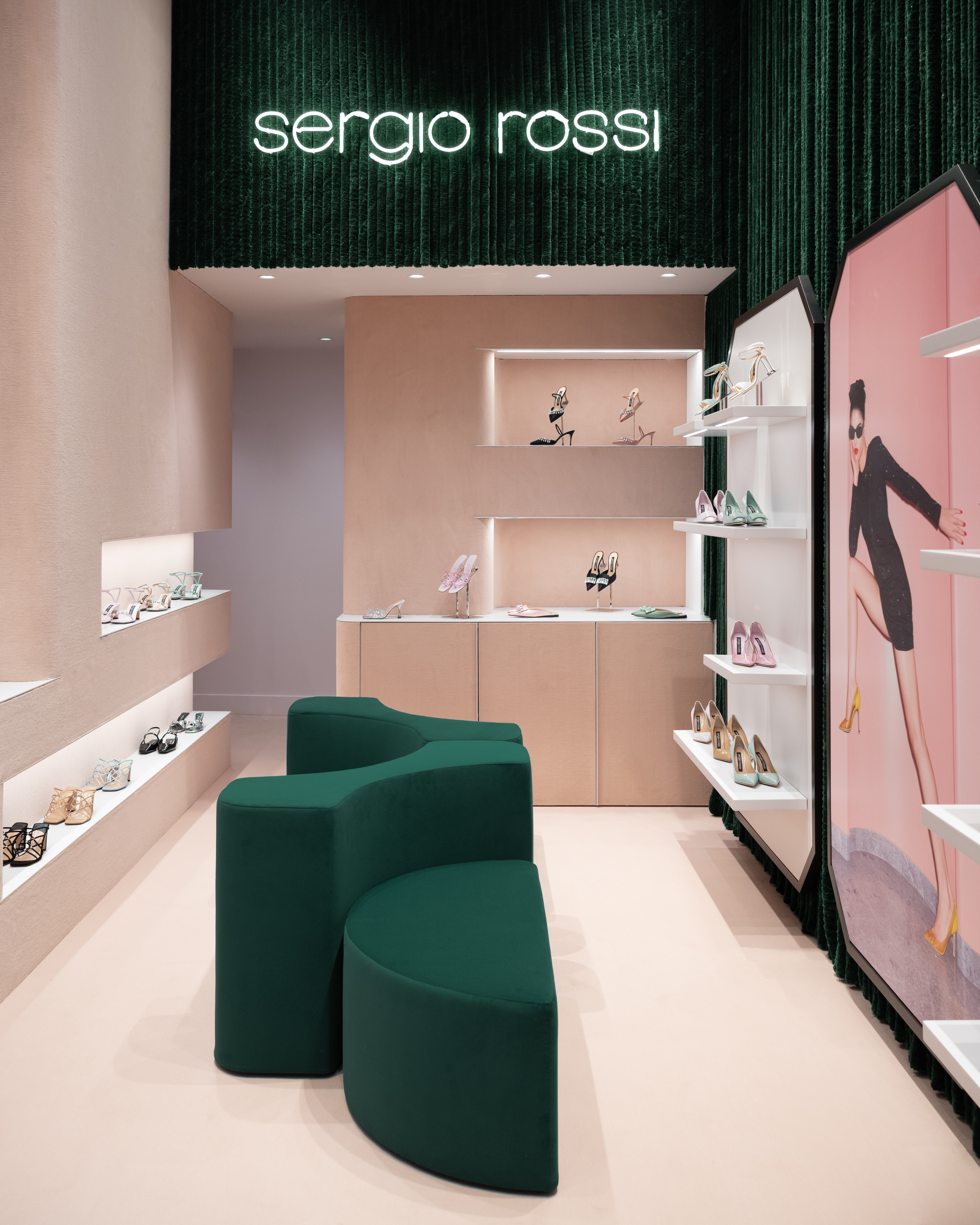
- Sergio Rossi pop-up store in Milan
- Industry: Luxury goods
- Founded: 1951; 75 years ago San Mauro Pascoli, Italy
- Founder: Sergio Rossi
- Headquarters: San Mauro Pascoli, Italy
- Area served: Worldwide
- Key people: Sebastiano Carta (Managing Director)
- Parent: Lanvin Group
- Website: www.sergiorossi.com

Sergio Rossi is an Italian fashion brand that focuses on footwear. The company was founded in 1951 by Sergio Rossi.

== History ==
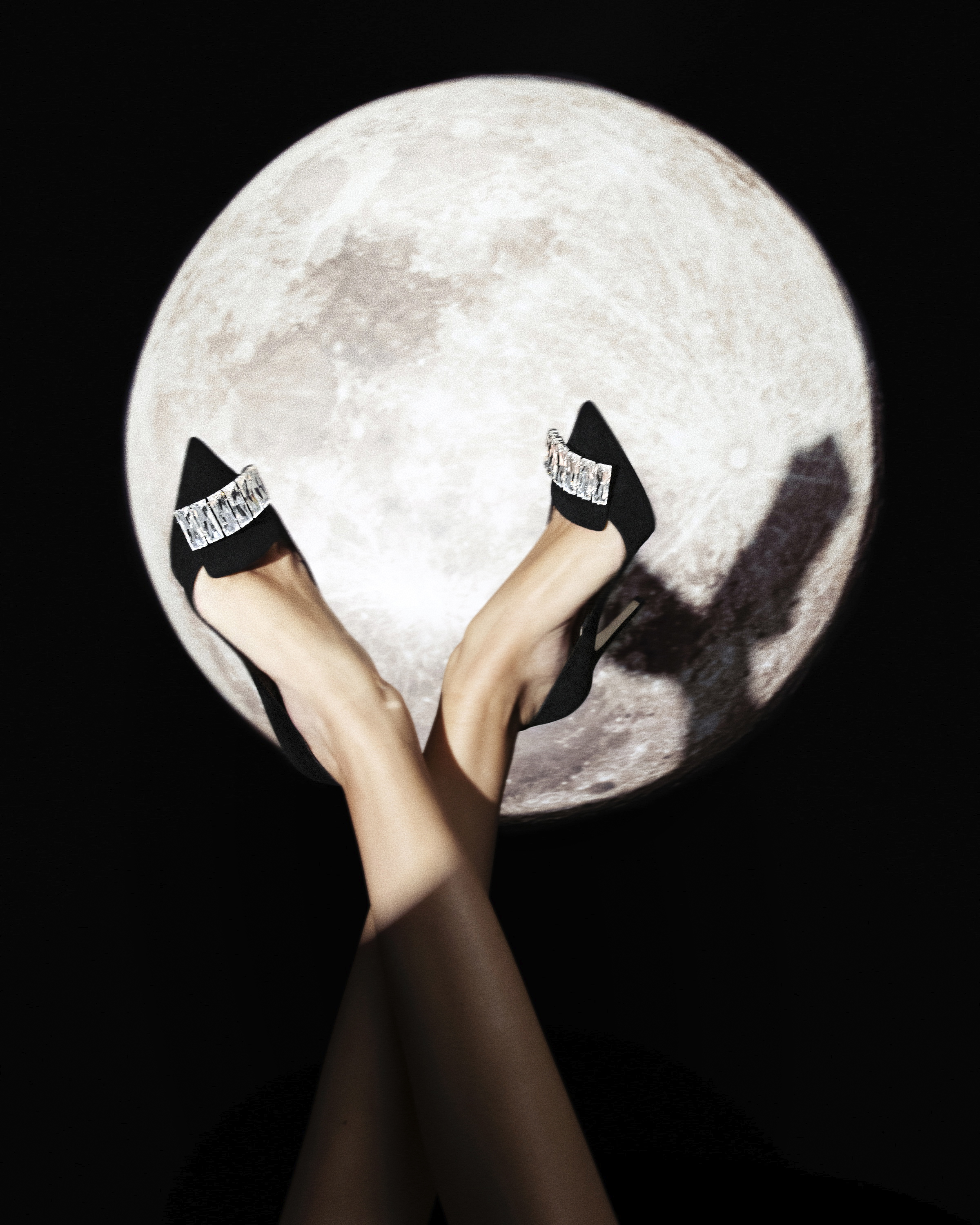
A Sergio Rossi shoe

The company traces its origins to 1951, when Sergio Rossi began producing footwear in San Mauro Pascoli. In his early career, Rossi crafted sandals during the winter months and sold them in summer on the beaches of Rimini, as well as to boutiques in Bologna.

The first shoes bearing the Sergio Rossi name appeared in the late 1960s, marking the transition from artisanal production to a structured brand. According to Vogue, during the 1960s, the company "rapidly became synonymous with Italian quality and classic feminine designs."

In the 1970s, Sergio Rossi collaborated with Gianni Versace, creating footwear for his early runway collections. During the 1980s, the company began expanding internationally, opening its first single-brand boutiques in Italy and later in major fashion capitals.

In 1999, the PPR Luxury Division, known as Gucci Group, acquired 70% of the shares of Sergio Rossi for a value of approximately $96 million. Six years later, the group acquired the remaining 30%, obtaining full control of the Sergio Rossi brand. In 2015, the company was sold to Investindustrial holdings.

In June 2021, Fosun Fashion Group announced that it had signed an agreement to acquire 100% of Sergio Rossi S.p.A. In July 2024, Paul Andrew was named as the brand's creative director.

== San Mauro production plant ==
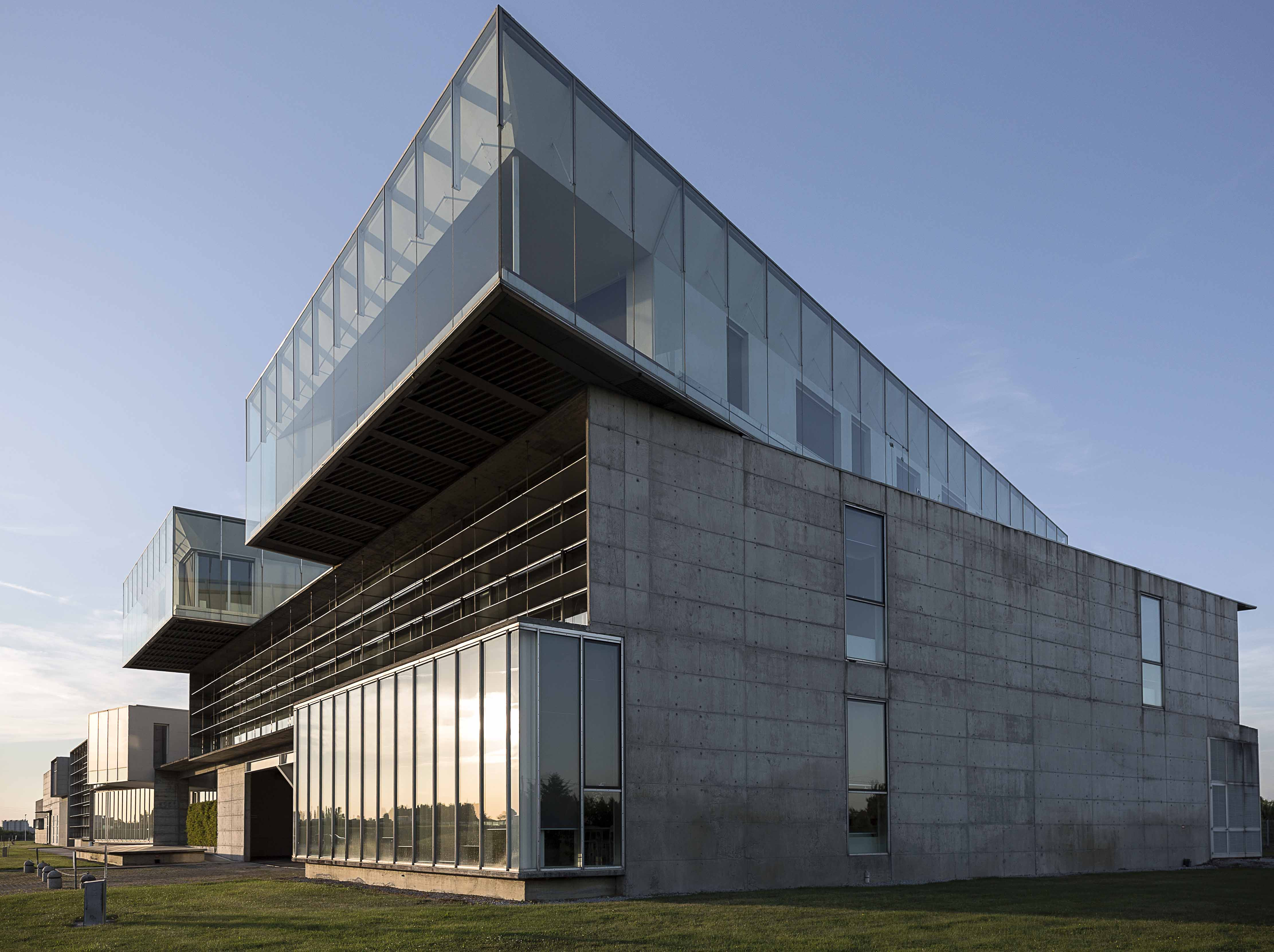
Sergio Rossi factory, San Mauro Pascoli

The San Mauro production plant was built in 2003. It measures a total of 55,600 square meters (598,000 sq ft), with 12,000 square meters (130,000 sq ft) accounting for production and warehouse space and 4,000-square-meter (43,000 sq ft) of space for offices, pattern, and prototype departments. San Mauro's industrial platform produces women's and men's luxury footwear.

== Organization of the store network ==
The brand has a network of 83 stores worldwide as well as an online sales site. In April 2011, Sergio Rossi began opening several men's boutiques in collaboration with Wallpaper* in Milan, Casablanca, and Tokyo. Since autumn 2011, most of the boutiques have been renovated around a new concept developed in collaboration with Ilse Crawford.
