= Order of the Knights of St. Crispin =

Former trade union of the United States

The Order of the Knights of St. Crispin was an American labor union of shoe workers formed in Wisconsin in 1867. It soon reached a membership of 50,000 or more, largely in the Northeast. However it was poorly organized and faded away by 1874. They fought to prevent innovation, including the introduction of new machinery, and worked to keep immigrant labor out of the workforce.

== History ==
The first lodge of the Knights of St. Crispin was organized in 1867 in Milwaukee, Wisconsin. As a union of shoemakers, it took its name from the Catholic Saint Crispin, the patron saint of cobblers. The founding members were Newell Daniels, Samuel Wilson, W. C. Haynes, Albert Jenkins, Thomas Houren, F. W. Wallace and Henry Palmer. The Order spread throughout Wisconsin and the Northeast and even into Canada. By 1871 it claimed about 400 lodges with 50,000 to 60,000 members. Dues paying members were far fewer. In Milwaukee the Knights owned and operated three cooperative shops. In 1872 some eastern lodges went on strike and suffered a crushing defeat, after which the organization rapidly declined. The order was revived in 1875 in Lynn, Massachusetts and defeated an attempt by the manufacturers to force their workers to sign a pledge not to join a union. In its heyday the Knights fought against employment of Chinese workers and tried to stop the training of new workers so as to keep wages high. The Panic of 1873 caused heavy layoffs in the factories and the Knights lost members rapidly.

== Constitution ==
One provision in its constitution explicitly sought to limit the entry of "green hands" into the trade. That effort failed because the new machines could be operated by semi-skilled workers and produce more shoes than hand sewing.

== See also ==
- North Adams strike
- Daughters of St. Crispin

== Bibliography ==
- Commons, John R. "American Shoemakers, 1648–1895: A Sketch of Industrial Evolution," Quarterly Journal of Economics 24 (November, 1909), 39–83. in JSTOR
- Commons, John R. (1918). History of Labour in the United States. Vol. 2. Archived from the original on 2013-01-17 – via Questia.
- Dawley, Alan. Class and Community: The Industrial Revolution in Lynn (1976) excerpt and text search
- Hall, John P. "The Knights of St. Crispin in Massachusetts, 1869–1878," Journal of Economic History 18 (June, 1958), 161–175. in JSTOR
- Gerald Zahavi, "The Endicott Johnson Corporation:19th Century Origins" (2001)
- Lescohier, Don D. The Knights of St. Crispin, 1867–1874; a study in the industrial causes of trade unionism Bulletin of the University of Wisconsin, #355. Economics and political science ser., v. 7, no. 1 Madison, Wis. 1910
