= Daughters of St. Crispin =

Former trade union of the United States

The Daughters of St. Crispin was an American labor union of female shoemakers, founded in Lynn, Massachusetts on July 28, 1869, and was the first national women's labor union in the United States.

The union began with a strike of over a thousand female workers in 1860 in Massachusetts. By the end of 1869, it had a total of 24 local lodges across the United States, the largest of which had over 400 members. Lodges were present in Massachusetts, California, Illinois, Maine, New Hampshire, New York, Ohio, and Pennsylvania. Conventions of all the lodges were held annually in Massachusetts until 1872. Carrie Wilson served as president of the union and Abbie Jacques was the secretary.

The name "Daughters of St. Crispin" was inspired by the contemporary men's union of shoemakers, the Order of the Knights of St. Crispin. Saint Crispin is the patron saint of cobblers, tanners, and leather workers.

In 1870, a convention of the Daughters of St. Crispin unanimously adopted a resolution which demanded equal pay for doing the same work as men. In 1872, 300 members of the union staged a strike in three factories in Stoneham, Massachusetts. This strike was unsuccessful but another that same year in Lynn, Massachusetts was successful, granting workers higher wages.

On one occasion, the Daughters of St. Crispin continued a strike after the male Knights of St. Crispin ended it, because they opposed a policy that would require a $5 deposit on employment, which would be forfeited if they did not stay for a full three-month testing period. The factory owners reversed the policy, but tried again a year later. The second time, the nearly 900 members struck again, and again won.

The Daughters of St. Crispin represented both resident stitchers, who lived in towns near the factories, and the 'floating' stitchers who traveled from factory to factory in response to seasonal shifts in work. Members were involved in contemporary debates about the impact of suffrage on the interests of working class women and middle class morality. Debates about suffrage were never fully resolved before the union dissolved.

Members of the union testified before Congress in 1874 in favor of labor laws that limited women and children to a 10-hour work day in manufacturing jobs.

Though the national organization began to decline as early as 1873 as a result of the Long Depression, local chapters in Massachusetts remained active, and many individual members eventually joined the Knights of Labor which formed in 1869.
