= Sergio Rossi (shoe designer) =

Italian shoe designer (1935–2020)

- Born: 31 July 1935; San Mauro Pascoli, Italy
- Died: 2 April 2020 (aged 84); Cesena, Italy
- Occupation: Fashion designer
- Years active: 1951–2020
- Known for: Sergio Rossi brand

Sergio Rossi (31 July 1935 – 2 April 2020) was an Italian shoe designer who founded his own brand.

== Biography ==
Rossi was born in San Mauro Pascoli in the Emilia-Romagna region of Italy. He worked with his father, a shoemaker, and learned the trade.

In 1951, he opened his first shoe store. He also made sandals and sold them to beach-goers in Rimini and at Bologna boutiques. In 1968, the first shoes, marked with the Rossi brand, were produced.

Each pair of shoes took at least 14 hours to make and went through 120 different stages. They were seen on runways for Gianni Versace, Azzedine Alaia and Dolce & Gabbana. He first gained attention in 1960 when film director Federico Fellini used his shoe for actress Anita Ekberg in La Dolce Vita.

In 1999, his brand was sold to the Gucci Group, now known as Kering for $96.2 million. It was then sold by Kering to Investindustrial in 2015.

In March 2020, Rossi and his company donated €100,000 to the Ospedale Luigi Sacco in Milan, in a joint effort from the fashion industry to combat the coronavirus pandemic in Italy.

== Family ==
Rossi's son, Gianvito Rossi, created his own footwear collection in 2006.

== Death ==
On 2 April 2020, Rossi died in Cesena at the Maurizio Bufalini Hospital from COVID-19 at the age of 84.
