= Daniel Asama Ago =

Nigerian politician

Daniel Asama Ago is a Nigerian politician. He currently serves as a member representing Bassa/Jos North Federal Constituency of Plateau State in the 10th House of Representatives under the platform of the Labour Party.
