= AGO system =

Manufacturing process for making stitchless shoes

The AGO system is the industrial process for manufacturing stitchless (glued) shoes.

The first effective and reliable adhesive was invented and patented in 1909 by the Italian chemist Francesco Rampichini, who also developed the whole manufacturing process and the relevant machinery in 1910–13.

The name AGO (from the Greek ago, meaning "attract", "fasten"), still used in the industry, was chosen by Rampichini for the glue and the process in 1910.

== Other reading ==
For earlier unsuccessful trials, starting with J. Bernard of France, 1857, and technical details, see Die mechanische Schuhreparatur, by Felix Fluss, Vienna 1932.
