= Santissima Annunziata =

Santissima Annunziata (Italian: Most Holy Annunciation) may refer to:

== Churches in Italy ==
- Basilica della Santissima Annunziata, Florence
- Basilica della Santissima Annunziata del Vastato, Genoa
- Basilica della Santissima Annunziata Maggiore, Naples
- Basilica-Sanctuary of Maria Santissima Annunziata, Trapani
- Church of the Santissima Annunziata in Sturla, Genoa
- Santissima Annunziata, Ascoli Piceno, Marche
- Santissima Annunziata, Parma, Emilia-Romagna
- Santissima Annunziata, Gaeta, Lazio
- Santissima Annunziata, Pesaro, Marche
- Santissima Annunziata, Circello, Campania
- Santissima Annunziata, Rubiera, Emilia Romagna
- Santissima Annunziata, Turin, Piedmont
- Santissima Annunziata, Pescia, Tuscany
- Santissima Annunziata, Barga, Tuscany
- Sanctuary of the Santissima Annunziata, Chieri, Turin
- Santissima Annunziata, Lucignano, Arezzo, Tuscany
- Concattedrale della Santissima Annunziata, or Todi Cathedral, Umbria
- Concattedrale della Santissma Annunziata, or Treia Cathedral, Macerata
- Cattedrale di Santa Maria Annunziata, or Anagni Cathedral, Lazio
- Cattedrale Maria Santissima Annunziata, or Acireale Cathedral, Sicily
- Cattedrale di Santa Maria Annunziata, or Camerino Cathedral, Marche
- Cattedrale di Maria SS. Annunziata, or Tursi Cathedral, Tursi, Basilicata
- Basilica Concattedrale di Santa Maria Annunziata, or Otranto Cathedral
- Basilica Concattedrale di Santa Maria Annunziata, or Sarsina Cathedral, Forlì-Cesena
- Abbazia di Santa Maria a Pie' di Chienti, also known as the Santissima Annunziata, Montecosaro Scalo, Marche
- Oratorio della Santissima Annunziata, Peretola, Florence
- Oratorio della Santissima Annunziata di Collecchio, Spilamberto, Spilamberto, Modena
- Church of the Santissima Annunziata dei Catalani, Messina, Sicily
- Church of Santissima Annunziata, Suvereto, Livorno

== Other uses ==
- Supreme Order of the Most Holy Annunciation, or Ordine Supremo della Santissima Annunziata, a Roman Catholic order of knighthood, originating in Savoy, Italy
- Piazza della Santissima Annunziata, a square in the city of Florence, Italy

== See also ==
- Annunziata, the Italian word for Annunciation, a given name and surname
- Annunciation
