= Annunziata (disambiguation) =

Annunziata may refer to:

- Annunziata, Italian given name and surname
- Annunziata Polyptych, painting cycle started by Filippino Lippi and finished by Pietro Perugino

== Churches ==
- Annunziata, Sessa Aurunca, Baroque-style Roman Catholic church in the municipality of Sessa Aurunca, province of Caserta, in the region of Campania, southern Italy.
- Annunziata, Venafro, a Baroque-style, Roman Catholic church located in a central part of the town of Venafro, province of Isernia, region of Molise, Italy

== See also ==
- Santissima Annunziata (disambiguation)
