= Daprato Rigali Studios =

American interior design company

Daprato Rigali Studios (formerly Daprato Statuary Company) is an interior restoration and renovation company in Chicago. It was founded in 1860 by the Daprato brothers, Italian immigrants from the town of Barga. The company specializes in interior renovations and restorations of historic and iconic buildings such as churches, theaters, hotels, banks, courthouses and commercial building lobbies. They specialize in project management and include decorative painting, stained glass and marble fabrication departments.

== History ==
In 1881, John E. Rigali, the great-grandfather of the firm's current family members, completed his training in Florence and immigrated to Chicago to work with the Daprato brothers. Rigali became a partner in 1884 and, in 1890, president of Daprato Statuary Company.

In 1909, Pope Pius X bestowed on Daprato Studios the title of "Pontifical Institute of Christian Art."

By the mid-1920s they operated locations in Chicago, Montreal, New York City and Pietrasanta.

In 1960, under the guidance of Robert Rigali, the organization took on the name, Daprato Rigali Studios.

The company is currently managed by 4th generation Rigali family members Bob, John, Mike and Elizabeth.

In 2019 they were awarded the Illinois Family Business of the Year Award by Loyola University Chicago.

In 2022 Daprato Rigali Studios completed the restoration of Grand Army of the Republic rotunda stained glass dome in the Chicago Cultural Center. The 40-foot diameter Tiffany-designed stained-glass dome had become covered in grime and paint and cut off the natural light that brought out the brilliant colors of the glass.

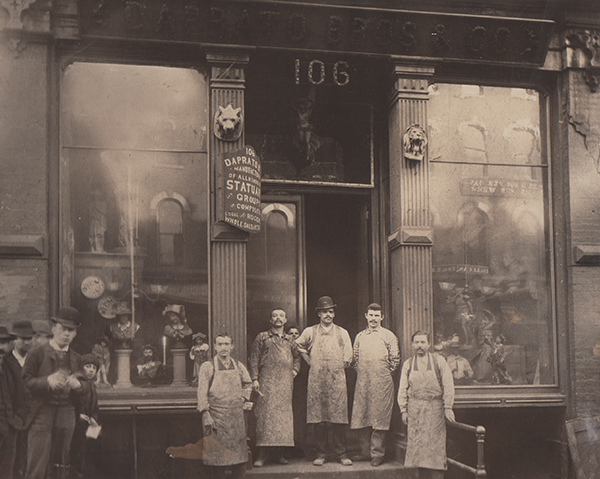
Daprato Statuary Company Founded in Chicago in 1860

== Notable projects ==
- Cathedral of Saint Mary of the Immaculate Conception (Peoria, Illinois)
- Holy Name Cathedral (Chicago) - Full restoration of interior following fire in 2009.
- Rookery Building
- Medinah Country Club
- St. John Cantius Church (Chicago)
- University of Saint Mary of the Lake
- Saint Clement Catholic Church, Chicago
- Sandwich City Hall (Theater)
- Cathedral of Christ the King (Atlanta)
- Cathedral of the Incarnation (Nashville, Tennessee)
- St. Hedwig's Church (Chicago)
- St. Mary's Church (Beaverville, Illinois)
- Queen of All Saints Basilica (Chicago, IL)
- KAM Isaiah Israel (Chicago, IL)
- Music Box Theatre (Chicago)
- Ramova Theater
- Madison Theatre - Peoria, IL
- Basilica of the Immaculate Conception (Natchitoches, Louisiana)
- Chicago Cultural Center (Chicago, IL) - Restoration of Stained Glass Dome
- Catlow Theater (Barrington, IL)

== Awards ==
1909 - The Pontifical Institute of Christian Art was awarded to Daprato Rigali by Pope Pius X in 1909.

2019 - Daprato Rigali Studios was awarded the Illinois Family Business of the Year Award by the Loyola University of Chicago Business Center.

2022 - Landmarks Illinois Richard H. Driehaus Foundation Preservation Award for Restoration.
