= Sant'Agata a Casale, Rubiera =

Church Building in Emilia-Romagna, Italy

Coordinates: 44°42′05.4″N 10°47′49.3″E

Santa Agata a Casale is a Roman Catholic church in a rural spot outside of Rubiera, province of Reggio Emilia, region of Emilia Romagna, Italy.

== History ==
A church at this site was documented in a papal bull of 1146, which mentions a chapel of Sant'Agata in the parish of Santi Faustino e Giovita, Rubiera. The church was dilapidated in a description of 1593, and rebuilt decades thereafter.
