= MAE 323 =

- Type: Aircraft engine
- National origin: Italy
- Manufacturer: Modena Avio Engines

The MAE 323 is a family of Italian aircraft engines, designed and produced by Modena Avio Engines (commonly called MAE) of Rubiera for use in light aircraft.

The company seems to have been founded about 2003 and gone out of business by 2015. Since 2012 its website has consisted only of a placeholder page.

== Design and development ==
The engine is a three-cylinder in radial-configuration, four-stroke, 2,238 cc (136.6 cu in) displacement, liquid-cooled, gasoline engine design, with a mechanical gearbox reduction drive with a reduction ratio of 1.91:1. It employs dual electronic ignition systems and has a compression ratio of 9.0:1.

== Variants ==
MAE 323
Model that produces 130 hp (97 kW) at 4500 rpm, with an engine weight of 82 kg (180.8 lb).
MAE 323 R
Model that produces 150 hp (112 kW) at 5500 rpm, with an engine weight of 93 kg (205.0 lb).

== Specifications (MAE 323) ==
Data from Tacke

=== General characteristics ===
- Type: Three-cylinder, four stroke, radial aircraft engine
- Bore: 100 mm (3.9 in)
- Stroke: 95 mm (3.7 in)
- Displacement: 2,238 cc (136.6 cu in)
- Length: 672 mm (26.5 in)
- Width: 660 mm (26.0 in)
- Height: 623 mm (24.5 in)
- Dry weight: 82 kg (180.8 lb)

=== Components ===
- Fuel type: gasoline
- Cooling system: liquid
- Reduction gear: mechanical gearbox

=== Performance ===
- Power output: 130 hp (97 kW)
- Compression ratio: 9.0:1

== See also ==
Related lists

- List of aircraft engines
