= Collegiate Church of San Cristoforo, Barga =

Roman Catholic church in Tuscany, Italy

Coordinates: 44.073292°N 10.485895°E

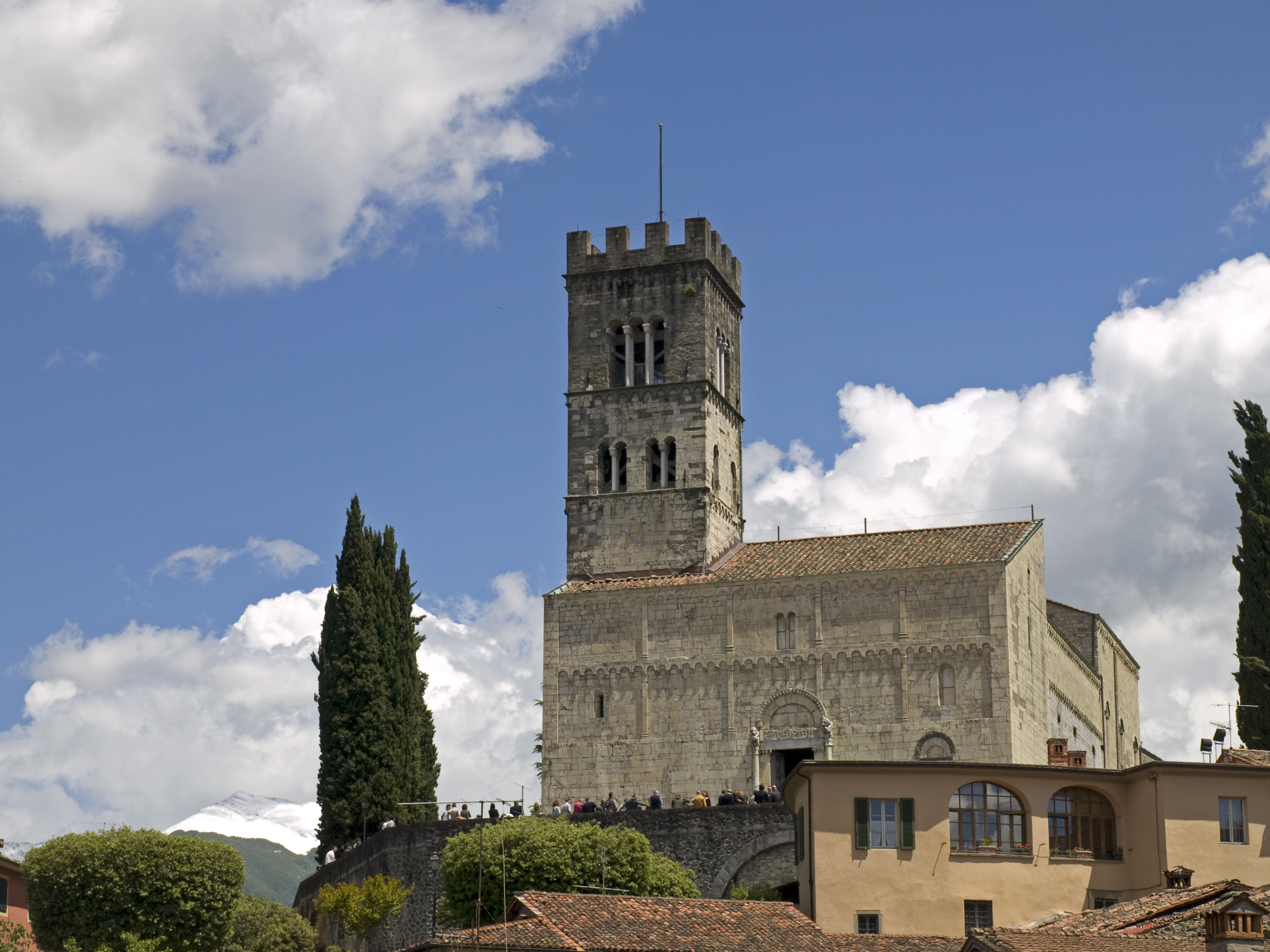
Facade and bell-tower as viewed from the town

The Collegiate Church of San Cristoforo, Barga (Italian: Duomo di Barga; Collegiata di San Cristoforo) is the main Roman Catholic church of the town of Barga, located in the region of Tuscany, Italy.

== History ==
Construction of the church started in the 11th century, although work continued into the 16th century. The main layout is an example of Romanesque architecture.

The church was built with white marble from the quarries near the town, and sited on a hilltop acropolis. The west front is a square wall with a castle-like bell-tower. The main Romanesque portal has two semi-columns with carved lion capitals; above is an arch and decorations with leaf motifs. One façade block has a repeated inscription - a prayer to the Archangel Michael. The characters are also seen in a block in the Baptistry opposite the Duomo of Pisa as well as other churches in Tuscany. The church has a central nave, and two lateral aisles. It contains some 12th- or 13th-century fonts, one with a carving depicting John the Baptist.

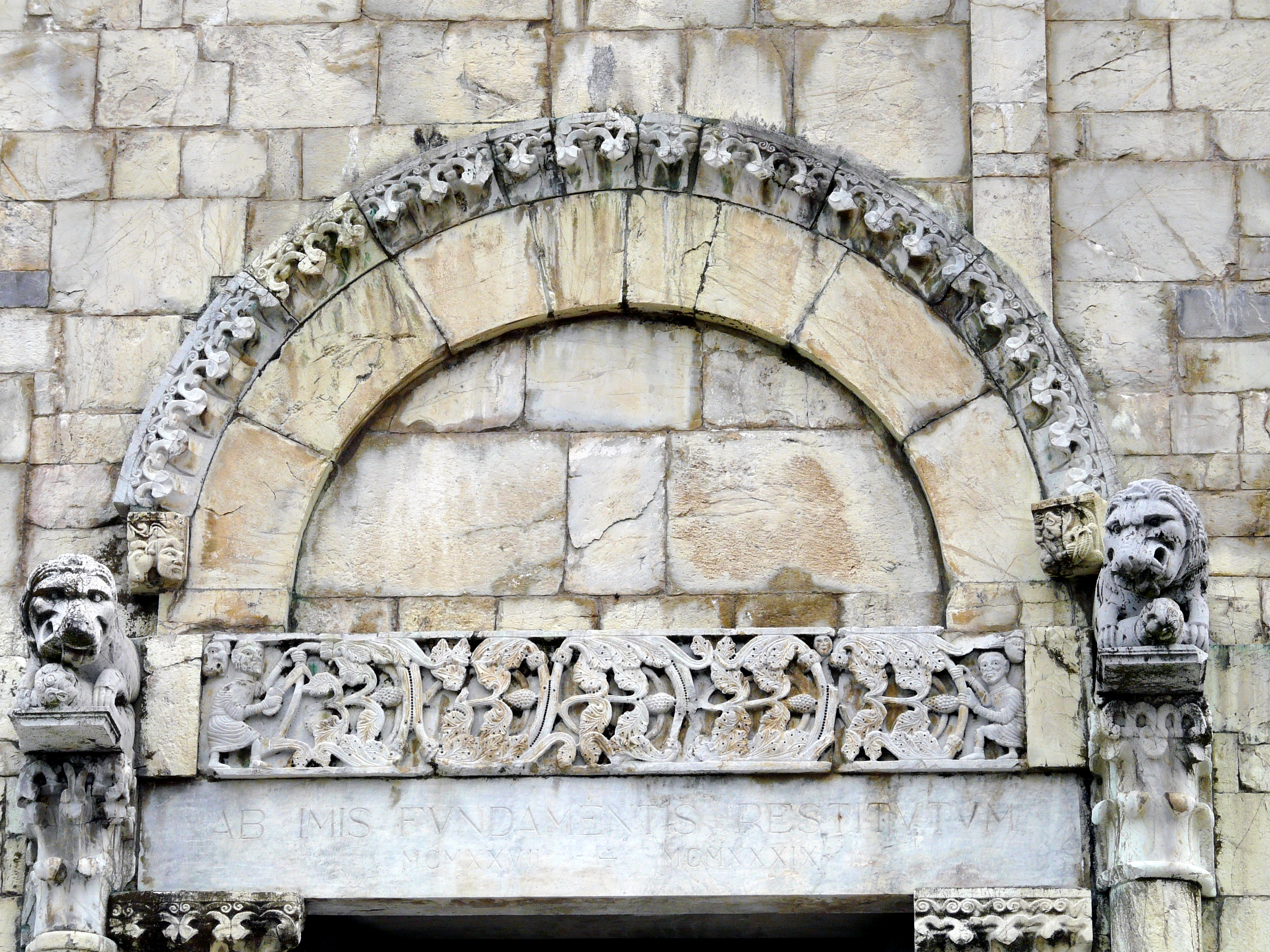
Top of main portal

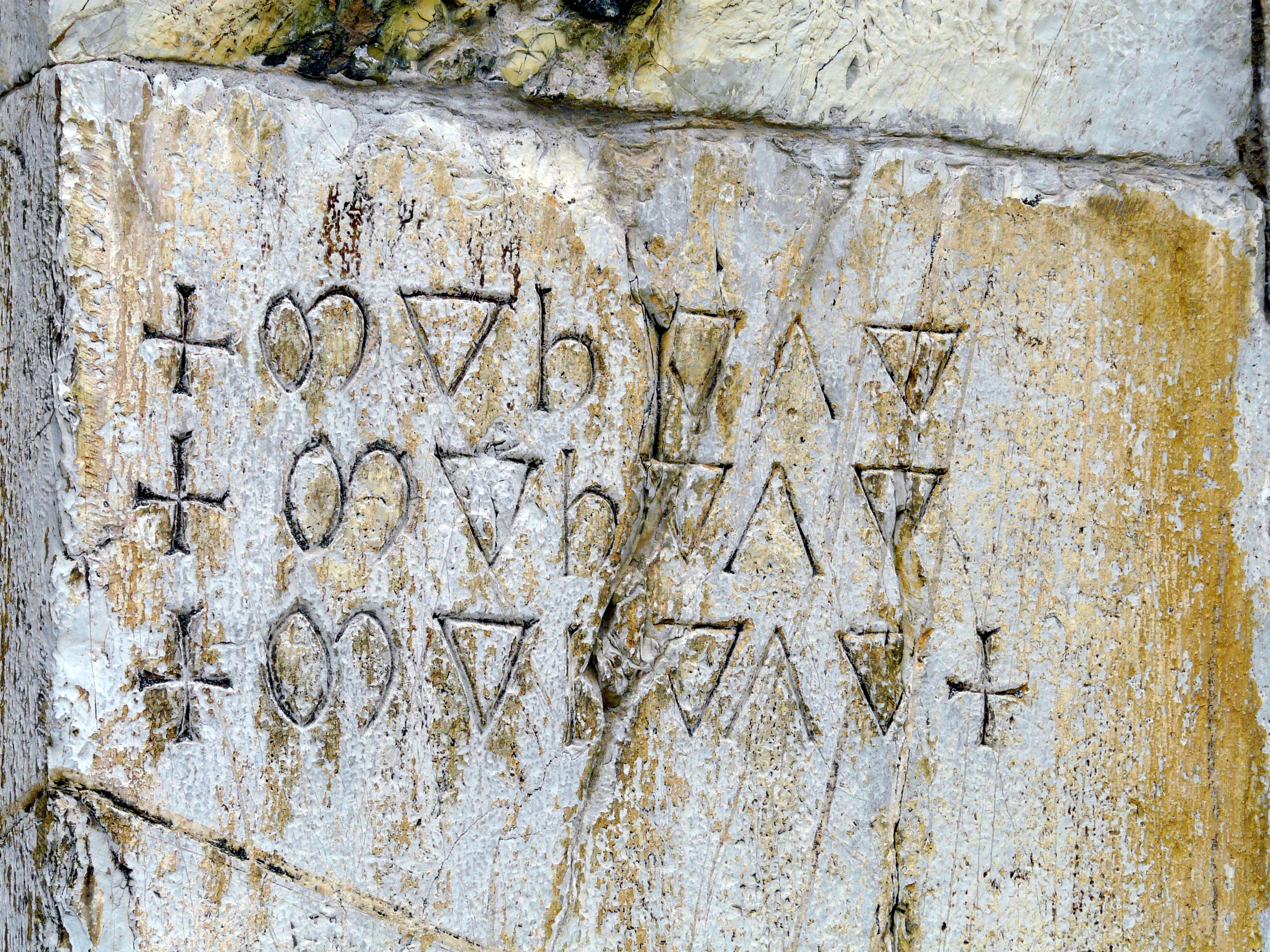
Inscription on façade: a prayer to Archangel Michael.

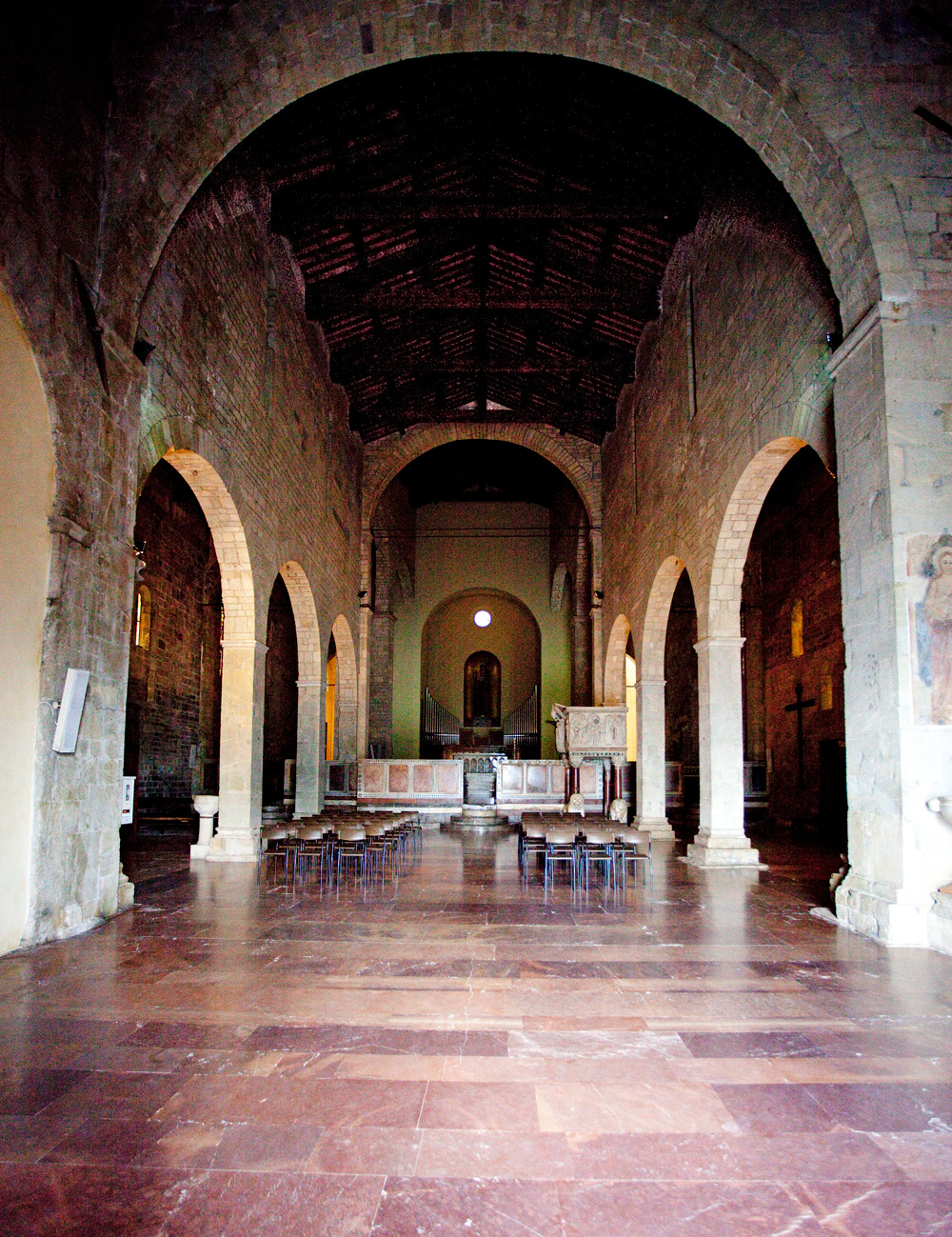
Church interior

The first pilaster has an ancient degraded fresco of Saint Lucy. The pulpit is carved with scenes from both the Old and New Testaments, and two support columns have lion bases. One of the scenes is an Annunciation, another the Nativity. A polychrome wood statue of the patron saint, Saint Christopher (Cristofano), stands behind the main altar. The chapel on the right has terra cotta by the studio of Della Robbia. The left chapel is dedicated to the Madonna del Molino; a 14th-century image of the Madonna is on a canvas depicting Barga circa 1500.

In 1862, the nave ceiling was replaced with a new wooden one, in the same style.

The adjacent Palazzo Pretorio is now the Museo Civico. A stairwell outside the church leads to the church of the Santissimo Crocifisso. At the start of the 20th century, the church had canvases attributed to Santi di Tito, Giovanni Roselli, and Stefano Tofanelli.
