= Antonio Nardini =

Italian historian and author (1922–2020)

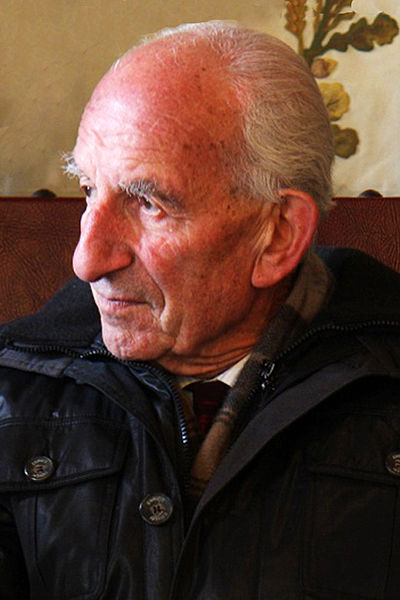
- Born: 7 February 1922 Barga, Tuscany, Kingdom of Italy
- Died: 5 March 2020 (aged 98)
- Occupation: Historian, writer

Antonio Nardini (7 February 1922 – 5 March 2020) was an Italian historian and author.

Nardini was an Italian Alpini officer during the Second World War. Nardini worked as a researcher, founder and president of the Group Ricerche storiche archeologiche and was Director of the local section of Istituto Storico Lucchese. Nardini helped organize photographic exhibitions about the Italian poet Giovanni Pascoli (1985) and about Italian colonial wars (1986). Nardini was a member and historic consultant of the magazine «L’ora di Barga» and covered various public and administrative officials, such as Counsellor of the Ospedale San Francesco of Barga and President of Artisans of Barga. He died in March 2020 at the age of 98.

== Works ==
Principal works of Antonio Nardini:

- Sommocolonia, Barga, Tipografia Gasperetti, 1953;
- Il Duomo e le sue opere d'arte, Barga, Tipografia Gasperetti, 1978;
- La storia del Teatro dei Differenti, Barga, Il giornale di Barga, 1983;
- I Tallinucci, Barga, Tipografia Gasperetti, 1985;
- Barga, paese come tanti, Lucca, San Marco Litotipo, Istituto Storico Lucchese, 1994;
- Tiglio e il suo territorio, Lucca, Istituto Storico Lucchese, 1996;
- Castelvecchio Pascoli, Lucca, Istituto Storico Lucchese, 1998;
- Storia del Teatro dei Differenti, Barga, Fondazione Ricci, 1998;
- Barga – L’arciconfraternita di misericordia, Lucca, Istituto Storico Lucchese, 1999;
- Il Beato Michele da Barga, Lucca, Istituto Storico Lucchese, 2000;
- Villa Angeli (Gherardi) di Barga, Barga, Istituto Superiore d'Istruzione, 2002;
- Guide turistiche e storiche di Barga, Bologna, Officina grafica, 2002, ISBN 88-607-8015-2;
- Barga in cartolina, la memoria storica attraverso una raccolta di immagini, Viareggio, M. Baroni 2003, ISBN 88-8209-257-7;
- Barga – Chiesa e Convento di San Francesco, Cappelli, Osmannoro, Sesto Fiorentino 2004;
- La Parrocchia – S. Pietro in Campo – Mologno, Barga, Gasperetti, 2006;
- Barga – Gli anni del Risorgimento, Lucca, Istituto Storico Lucchese, 2011;
- La villa Gherardi - Dai Marchesi Angeli al Comune, Istituto Storico Lucchese, 2012.

=== With other authors ===
- Il Duomo di Barga – Storia, arte e spiritualità nei primi tre secoli dopo il Mille (Barga 2012);
- La pieve di Santa Maria Assunta in Loppia, Grafiche Gelli, Calenzano 2008;
- Baccio Ciarpi, Barga, Tipografia Gasperetti, 2007;
- Barga Medicea, Città di Castello, Tiferno Grafica, 1983;
- La Fornacetta. Una chiesa e il suo organo, Barga, Tipografia Gasperetti, 1987;
- Mons. Piero Giannini, Barga, Tipografia Gasperetti, 2008;
- Ponte all'Ania, Barga, Tipografia Gasperetti, 2012;
- Don Francesco e il Sacro Cuore di Barga, Osmannaro (Firenze), Grafiche Cappelli Srl, 2010.

== Articles ==
- "Rapporti familiari fra Barga fiorentina e la Garfagnana estense", «La Rocca» magazine, 1990 (1);
- "Curiosità sul Duomo di Barga", «Fenix» magazine (March 2012).

== Awards ==
Nardini has received several acknowledgements including:

- Plate in memory of the ceremony in honor of Vincenzo Gonnella, 10/7/1984;
- Plate for the exhibition "Barga Garibaldina", 10/2/1982;
- Medal for his cooperation to the celebrations of the 1st centenary of Pietro Tallinucci death, 7/7/1985;
- Medal of acknowledgement for his contribution to 50th anniversary of the magazine «Giornale di Barga», 8/6/1999;
- Golden St Christopher, 7/26/1995.
