= Frank Viviano =

Sicilian-American journalist and foreign correspondent

Frank Viviano (born Francesco Paolo Viviano in Detroit, Michigan in 1947) is a Sicilian-American journalist and foreign correspondent. He attended De La Salle High School in Detroit and the University of Michigan.

His journalism career began in 1977. He traveled widely from 1979 to 1986 for the Pacific News Service and several magazines, and from 1986 to 2002 as the at-large foreign correspondent for the San Francisco Chronicle. He was the Chronicle's Asia correspondent until 1990 and then worked as the Paris bureau chief beginning in 1990. He covered the overthrow of Philippines dictator Ferdinand Marcos, the Tiananmen Square protests of 1989, the collapse of the Soviet Union, the rise of terrorism in the Middle East and the civil war in the Balkans.

In addition to his work for the Chronicle, Viviano's articles have appeared in more than 200 newspapers and magazines internationally, including Mother Jones and National Geographic Magazine, for whom he has covered stories in more than two dozen countries since 2003. As of February 2023, his most recent National Geographic assignments were on Venice's efforts to combat rising sea levels (Note: Frank Viviano, "Saving Venice from flooding may destroy the ecosystem that sustains it", National Geographic, 25 July 2022. Accessed by the Wayback Machine on 25 July 2022.) and the outsized role of the Netherlands in global agriculture. (Note: Frank Viviano, "This tiny country feeds the world", National Geographic.) As a freelancer, he has also written a front-page story on Brexit in the New York Times International edition, (Note: Frank Viviano. "Who keeps Britain's trains running? Europe", New York Times, 15 February 2018.) and an essay for the New York Review of Books on the Italian journalist Enrico Deaglio's book on the mass lynchings of Sicilian immigrants in 19th-century Louisiana. (Note: Frank Viviano, "Atrocities America forgot", New York Review 6 June 2019. Accessed 17 January 2025. A review of Enrico Deaglio's book Storia vera e terribile tra Sicilia e America.)

Viviano's books, published in 14 countries, include Dispatches from the Pacific Century (1993) and Blood Washes Blood: A True Story of Love, Murder, and Redemption Under the Sicilian Sun (2001). He is the author of five other books. He is an eight-time nominee for the Pulitzer Prize, and has been named "Journalist of the Year" by four media and current events organizations in the United States, including the World Affairs Council and the Society of Professional Journalists.

He is presently a staff writer for the Barga Italy-based online Barganews. He is the brother of longtime Mad Magazine art director and illustrator Sam Viviano and a cousin to New Testament scholar and author, Benedict Viviano.
