= Swietlan Kraczyna =

American artist (1940–2026)

Swietlan Nicholas Kraczyna (March 24, 1940 – February 1, 2026) was an American painter and printmaker in Florence, Italy, as well as in Barga, Italy. His work can be found in private collections and galleries around the world, as well as in the Prints and Drawings Collection of the Uffizi Gallery in Florence.

== Early life ==
Swietlan Nicholas Kraczyna was born on March 24, 1940, in Kamin-Kashyrskyi, Ukrainian SSR, USSR, near the Soviet-German border, to Polish and Russian parents. In 1945, while World War II was still going on, his family emigrated westward to flee the advancing Red Army, and eventually settled in a Polish refugee camp in Western Germany at the end of the war. In 1951, the family was sponsored by an American church group to move to New Haven, Connecticut, where Kraczyna completed his junior high and high school years.

In 1962, Kraczyna graduated from the Rhode Island School of Design with a B.F.A. in painting; in 1964 he earned an M.F.A. from Southern Illinois University. That same year, he and his wife Amy Luckenbach moved to Florence, Italy, where Kraczyna lived till his death. Amy, a successful puppet-maker and puppeteer, died of cancer in 2009.

Kraczyna became a master of multi-plate color etching in the early 1970s. His art reflects ancient themes and traditions of the Italian Renaissance often inspired by music, dance, mythology, and theater. The countryside of Tuscany which surrounded him daily, both in his primary home in the hills of Colleramole (just south of Florence), and in his secondary home in the hills of Barga (just north of Lucca), is also a frequent inspiration for his work.

== Teaching graphic arts ==
Kraczyna had taught etching and printmaking in the United States, England, Italy, and the Czech Republic. In 1967, he moved his artistic focus from painting to the graphic arts and set up the first printmaking department at Villa Schifanoia's Rosary College Graduate School of Fine Arts in Fiesole, where he taught for 16 years.

In 1970, he was one of ten artists to represent the United States at the Palazzo Strozzi Biennale di Grafica. In 1983, he co-founded, together with Maria Luigia Guaita and others, the Florentine International School of Advanced Printmaking, Il Bisonte, where he taught until 1992. He taught at the Sarah Lawrence College program in Florence from 1994 until the program's closure in spring 2016, and has been teaching at the Syracuse University program in Florence since 1998. Every summer, his workshop in multi-plate color etching in Barga, Tuscany, Italy, attracted students from all over the world: Japan, Korea, Peru, Colombia, Mexico, Turkey, United States, England and Italy.

== Death ==
On February 1, 2026, Swietlan Kraczyna died suddenly in Barga, Tuscany, at the age of 85.

== Books and exhibits ==
Kraczyna was a co-author of I Segni Incisi, the first Italian textbook on the history and comprehensive techniques of etching. In 1975 he published Dancing the Labyrinth: Multi-Plate Color Etchings 1975–1985 with an introduction by Corrado Bologna (Belforte Editore, Livorno, Italy).

From 2007-08, he was Artist in Residence at Syracuse University (New York State), where he held an exhibit of multi-plate color etchings entitled "Icarus and Stravinsky" at the university museum gallery, as well as an exhibit entitled "Labyrinths" at the Point of Contact Gallery (Syracuse, New York) inside a complex structure of mirrors created around 25 drawings and etchings inspired by Borges' notion of the labyrinth.

In 2003, Kraczyna held a large exhibit of his works entitled "Icarus: 40 Years of Flight" at the Fondazione Ricci, in Barga, Tuscany, where Kraczyna worked from 1962 until 2002.

In 2006, in honor of the forty-year anniversary of the catastrophic flood of 1966, 83 of Kraczyna's photographs were published in the volume "The Great Flood of Florence: A Photographic Essay," including 10 photos for which Kraczyna was awarded the Fiorino d'Oro, the highest honor of merit bestowed upon a resident of Florence.

== Publications ==
- Swietlan Nicholas Kraczyna (2007). The Great Flood of Florence: A Photographic Essay. Syracuse University in Florence. ISBN 978-88-95250-00-7. OCLC 76000198.
- 1993 Swietlan Kraczyna: thirty year retrospective
- 1998 Swietlan N. Kraczyna, Artist-in-Residence
- 1985 I Segni incisi: guida alla xilografia e alla incisione in nero e a colori.
- 1985 The Rite of Spring and the Nine Variations on a Theme of Igor Stravinsky:
- 1982. Oneiric Carnival, Swietlan Kraczyna

== Sources ==
- News source for Kraczyna
