= Paolo Riani =

Italian architect and urban planner (b. 1937)

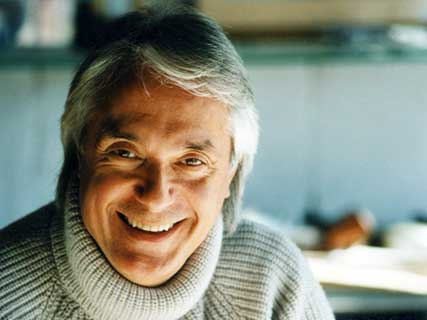
- Born: 8 September 1937 (age 88); Barga
- Occupation: Architect

Paolo Riani (born 8 September 1937) is an Italian architect and urban planner of award-winning projects worldwide spanning a professional career of over 40 years.

== Biography ==
Riani was born in Barga, Tuscany, Italy, in 1937 and maintains a home and office in Viareggio, on the Tuscan coast. Son of Maria Assunta Pieroni and Albano Riani, aviator in the Italian Air Force, he grew up in Barga and later in Montecatini Terme. He attended the School of Architecture in the University of Florence, where he was a disciple and collaborator of the urban planner Edoardo Detti. He graduated in 1965, with a thesis in Urban planning. From 1965 to 1971 he lived and worked in Tokyo, Japan, where he collaborated in the offices of architect Kenzo Tange together with Arata Isozaki and Kisho Kurokawa. He also taught Master Planning at the University of Tokyo Todai. During this period his most important projects were Caesar's Palace nightclub (1969), Mitsubishi Estate Co. in Tokyo (1971) and the City of Kyoto Master Plan.

Between 1994 and 1998 he abandoned architecture and dedicated himself entirely to politics. He was elected senator of the Republic of Italy in the XII Legislature and took part in numerous work commissions not only on a national scale but also for the European Community, NATO and United Nations. After this period dedicated to politics, he went back to his profession as an architect and designed projects like the sustainable development plan for Massaciuccoli lake, multi-use complexes for the historic centres of Massa, Viareggio and Lucca, an industrial complex in Monsagrati, a residential estate in Pieve a Nievole, the Resistance Museum in Genoa and he worked on the restoration of Alta Valdera and the Comune of Peccioli.

From 2000 to 2002, Riani was the Director of the Italian Cultural Institute in New York City. As of 2002, he is the executive director of the Italian Cultural Foundation of America (ICFA), a non-profit organization founded with his wife Elizabeth. He has since gone back to his profession and in 2004 he was appointed Architecture professor at the Engineering Faculty of Pisa University and the following year was appointed an honorary member of the Academic Senate of the International Academy of Modern Art (AIAM) in Rome.
