= John E. Rigali =

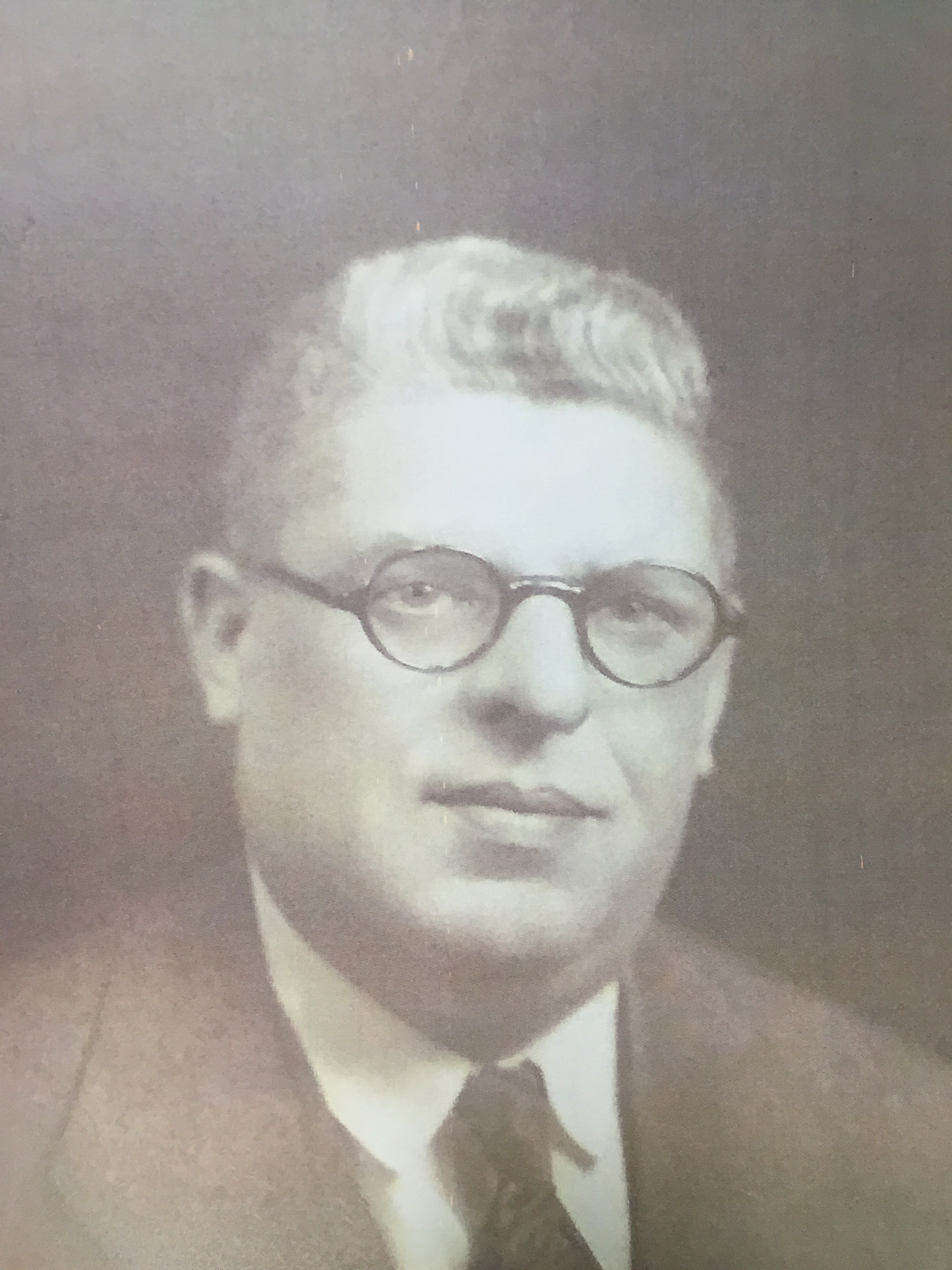
John E. Rigali in 1920

John E. Rigali was an Italian-American sculptor and entrepreneur. He was the President of the Daprato Statuary Company (Currently Daprato Rigali Studios) from 1890 until his death in 1936.

== Early life ==
John E. Rigali was born in Barga, Tuscany. He came to Chicago from Italy as a boy and at the age of 16 became an apprentice in the Daprato Statuary Studios, which at that time consisted of a small group of sculptors.

== Career ==
He worked his first year for room and board. He slept, ate, and worked in the studio's basement at Van Buren and Clark streets. By night he and the Daprato brothers fashioned the figurines. By day he sold them to the Chicago residents. Rigali suggested the business switch from making novelty statuettes to supplying churches with altars and statues. In 1890 he became President of the firm and oversaw its growth into a worldwide ecclesiastical art producer and distributor. Rigali is also credited as the sole inventor of 'Rigalico', a resin-composite material that had the appearance of marble, although it was lighter and more easily crafted.

Near retirement, Rigali was also involved in several Italian clubs and groups in Chicago. He was the President of the Italian Chamber of Commerce and was the treasurer of the Italian Red Cross. The Italian government made him a Chevalier, later a Knight, and in 1930 a Commandatore in the Order of Merit of the Italian Republic.

== Family ==
One of his sons, Joe Rigali, played football at the University of Notre Dame and won the 1924 National Championship playing alongside the "Four Horseman" and coached by Knute Rockne. One of Joe Rigali's sons (John E. Rigali's Grandson) Robert Rigali Sr., played for the 1953 Notre Dame Team coached by Frank Leahy that went undefeated and was awarded the National Championship by 10 selectors. Joe Rigali and Robert Rigali Sr. both went on to work at Daprato Rigali Studios. Several of John E. Rigali's great-grandchildren manage Daprato Rigali Studios today.

== Death ==
The Great Depression resulted in difficult times for the Daprato Statuary Company and John E. Rigali died on February 26, 1936. His son Joe Rigali took over the family company after his father's death in 1936.
