= Barga Jazz =

Coordinates: 44.072°N 10.484°E

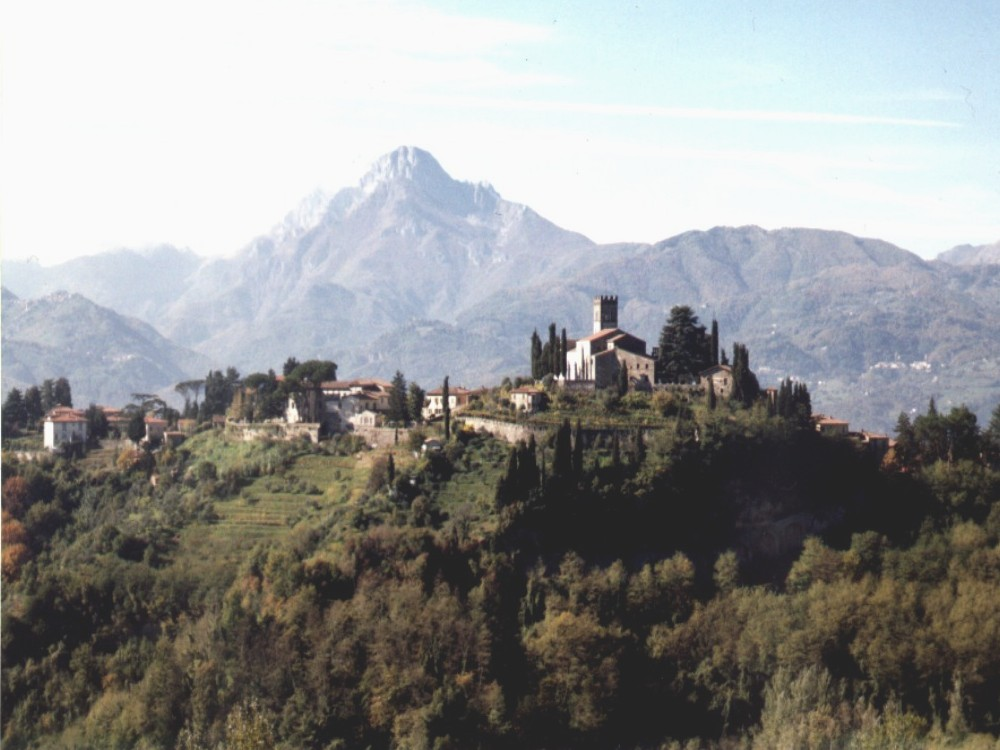
Barga facing the Alps.

Barga Jazz is a long-running jazz festival. The 26th edition of the festival was in 2013. It takes place in the medieval town of Barga, in the province of Lucca, in Tuscany, central Italy.

The Jazz festival features a competition for arrangements and compositions for the Barga Jazz Orchestra.
