= San Francesco, Barga =

Church and monastery in Barga, Italy

Coordinates: 44°04′13.4″N 10°28′52.9″E

San Francesco is a 15th-century, Roman Catholic church and convent located on the Via Ducale connecting the town of Barga with the lower valley, in the region of Tuscany, Italy.

== History ==
The church houses a 15th-century terracotta works by the studio of Andrea della Robbia. The convent features a fifteenth-century cloister inspired by Franciscan simplicity. The altarpiece with the Nativity can be traced to around 1500.
