= Annunziata =

- Gender: Female

Other names
- Related names: Nunzia, Nunziata, Annunciata, Nunziatina, Annunziatina, Annunzia, Nunziella, Nunzietta, Annuncia, Nuncia, Nancy, Tina

Annunziata is the Italian word for the Annunciation. It is generally understood to refer to the young Mary, mother of Jesus, receiving the word of the Angel Gabriel that she is to bear the Christ child. It is a common theme for reverence in Roman Catholicism. In Catholic families where all the children are girls it is sometimes given to a new child in the hope that the next born will be a boy.

Notable people with the name include:

== Given name ==
- Nancy Dell'Olio (born 1961), Italian-American lawyer
- Annunziata Rees-Mogg (born 1979), English freelance journalist and former MEP for the East Midlands

== Surname ==
- Christina Annunziata, American medical oncologist
- Ed Annunziata, American video game designer
- Lucia Annunziata (born 1950), Italian journalist
- Sandy Annunziata (born 1969), Canadian football player
- Thomas Annunziata (born 2005), American auto racing driver
- Xavi Annunziata (born 1987), Spanish football player

== See also ==
- Santissima Annunziata (disambiguation)
