= Barga, Tuscany =

Barga
- Comune
- Comune di Barga
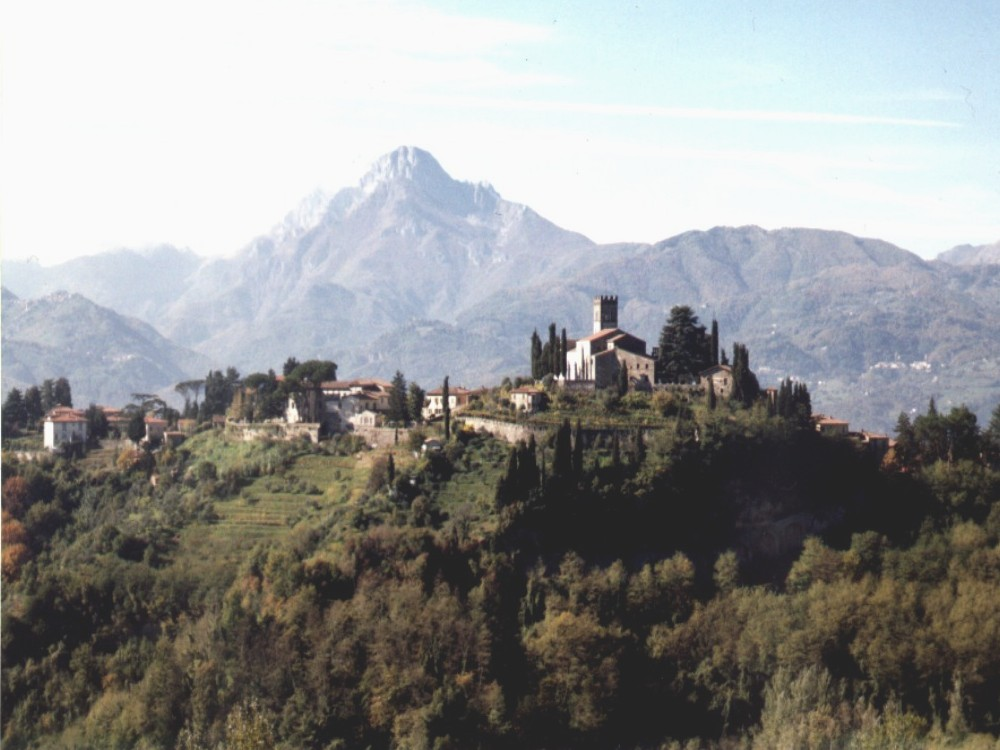
- View of Barga.

- Coat of arms

- Location within Italy Location within Tuscany
- Coordinates: 44°04′30″N 10°28′54″E
- Country: Italy
- Region: Tuscany
- Province: Lucca (LU)
- Frazioni: Castelvecchio Pascoli, Filecchio, Fornaci di Barga, Mologno, Ponte all'Ania, Sommocolonia, Renaio, Tiglio

Government
  - Mayor: Marco Bonini (Democratic Party)

Area
  - Total: 66 km^{2} (25 sq mi)
- Elevation: 410 m (1,350 ft)

Population (1 January 2025)
  - Total: 9,461
  - Density: 140/km^{2} (370/sq mi)
- Demonym: Barghigiani
- Time zone: UTC+1 (CET)
  - Summer (DST): UTC+2 (CEST)
- Postal code: 55051
- Dialing code: 0583
- Patron saint: St. Christopher
- Saint day: July 25
- Website: Official website

Barga is a medieval town and comune of the province of Lucca in Tuscany, central Italy. It is home to around 10,000 people and is the chief town of the "Mediavalle" (mid valley) of the Serchio River. It is one of I Borghi più belli d'Italia ("The most beautiful villages of Italy").

Barga is a member of Cittaslow.

== History ==
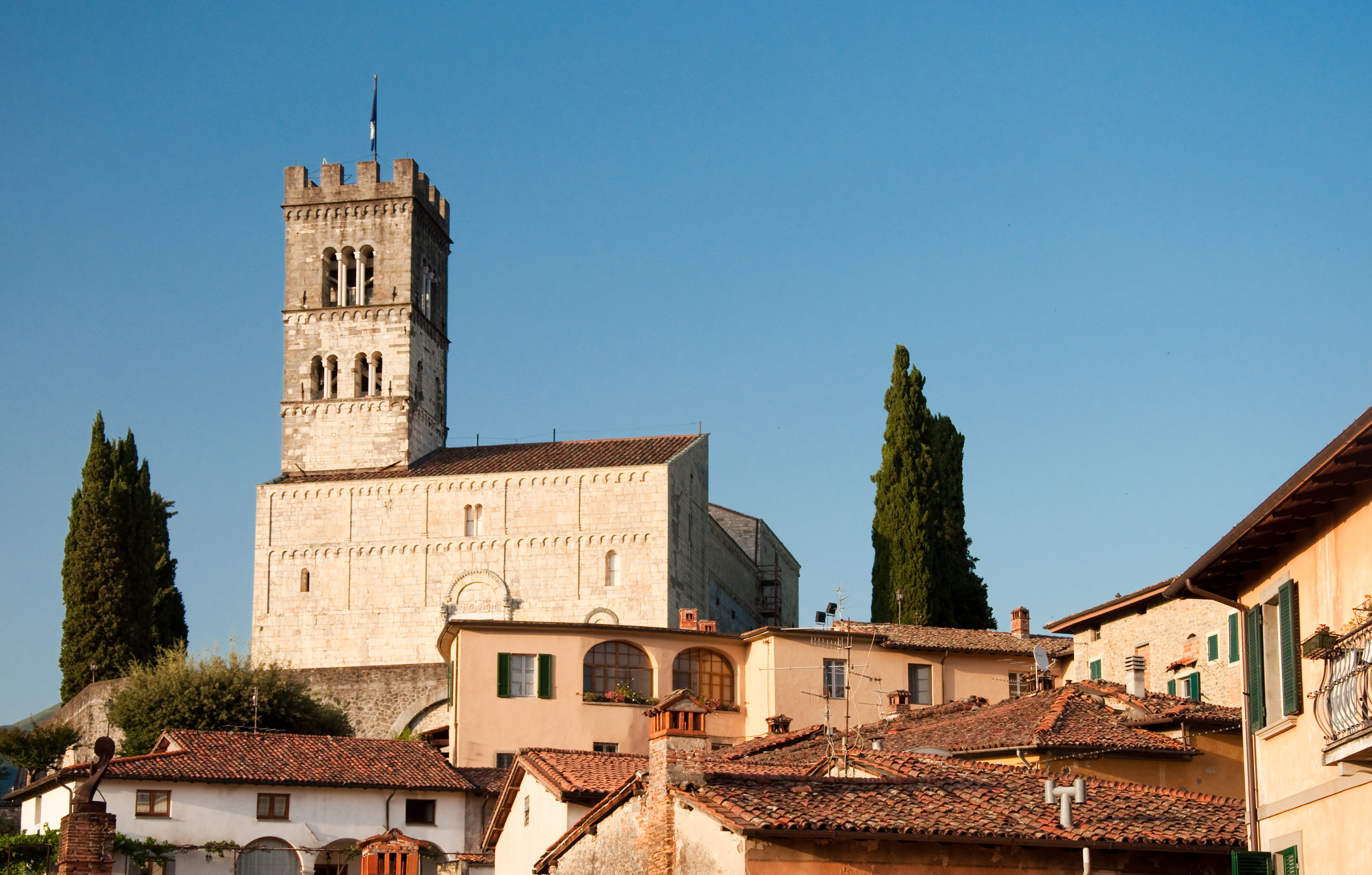
Barga Cathedral

In the 9th century, Barga was mentioned as a family fief of the Lombard family of Rolandinghi. In the 11th century, Barga obtained from Matilda of Tuscany broad privileges including tax exemptions. However, formally Barga was still subordinate to Lucca. When Matilda died, she left all her estates, including the Serchio Valley, to the Church, which was not a popular decision, sparking a war. Despite the war, Barga was not looted, apparently because of the presence of a nuncius sent to the valley by the Pope Gregory IX. As a result of the war, the diocese of Lucca was abolished and split between several parties, including Pisa. Barga took advantage of it, and in the 13th century helped Pisa against Lucca, but in 1236 was finally subordinated to Lucca.

After these events, Barga developed as an important trade city with connections with Modena over mountain roads. The city grew as a castle surrounded by a line of walls, of which two gates (Porta Reale and Porta Macchiaia) have survived. The town was well known during the Middle Ages for the manufacture of silk yarns which were exported to major centres such as Florence, its mills powered by the hydraulic power of the nearby creeks. In the Middle Ages, Lucca and Pisa battled frequently to conquer the wealthy town and the surrounding territory, and for a time Barga was part of the Florentine dominion, later Duchy and Grand Duchy of Tuscany. Between 1331 and 1859 Albiano owed its allegiance to the Florentine State. It became part of the Kingdom of Italy in 1861. Since 1923 Barga has been part of the province of Lucca.

The region was part of the Gothic Line in World War II, and saw fierce fighting between the Allies and Germans from October 1944 until April 1945, especially during the Battle of Garfagnana at the end of December 1944.

== Geography ==
Barga lies 35 kilometres (22 mi) north of the provincial capital, Lucca. It is overlooked by the village of Albiano, a località of Barga, which in the 10th century was the site of a castle protecting the town.

Pania della Croce, a mountain of the Apuan Alps, dominates the surrounding chestnut trees, grape vines and olive groves.

== Culture ==
Barga is known as "the most Scottish town in Italy," because at the end of the 19th century many Italians from the town immigrated to Scotland. There were many returnees over the years and now between 40 and 60% of present-day residents have Scottish relatives. An iconic red telephone box from the UK was given to the people of Barga and placed in the town centre, where it now operates as a book exchange, dubbed "the smallest library in Tuscany". There is an annual international opera festival, the Opera Barga Festival, and a long-running and very successful jazz festival, Bargajazz. Recently, Barga has become the home of many painters, including John Bellany and Swietlan Kraczyna, who exhibit their work in some of the small galleries within the castle walls.

The sagra is a feature of Italian rural culture: communal meals for several hundred people, eaten in the open air, often in orchards, vineyards or sports grounds. Originally religious celebrations, they are now often used to raise funds for local causes. Each town and village will have its own particular sagra. Around Barga from July to September, it is possible to participate in a sagra every night. In Barga itself, there is the Cena in Vignola in the vineyard below the Duomo, and in August the Sagra del Pesce e Patate (Fish and Chips Festival) in celebration of the Scottish connection. At nearby San Pietro in Campo, there is the Sagra del Maiale (pork), at Filecchio the Sagra della Polenta e Ucelli (originally small wild birds, now pheasant), and at Fornaci di Barga the 1°Maggio expo.

The Italian Touring Club has recently assigned the "orange flag" of the I Borghi più belli d'Italia (Best Villages of Italy), a distinguished sign recognizing the peculiarity of its beauty and its quality. Since 1999, Barga has also been the home of the "European Gnome Sanctuary" run by the Garden Gnome Liberation Front.

The frazione of Castelvecchio Pascoli was home to the Italian 19th-century poet Giovanni Pascoli.

In 2008, Barga became the first medieval historic centre in Italy to be mapped and equipped with QR codes (2D barcodes) for all of the churches, palazzo statues, restaurants, bars and places of interest. After a two-year trial, the project was released to the public in December 2010 under the name iBarga, allowing visitors to get up-to-date information about the city on their phones.

The British writer Len Deighton wrote his novel SS-GB in a rented hut on the outskirts of Barga, using a manual typewriter bought in the town. One of the novel's main characters has the family name "Barga" in homage to the town.

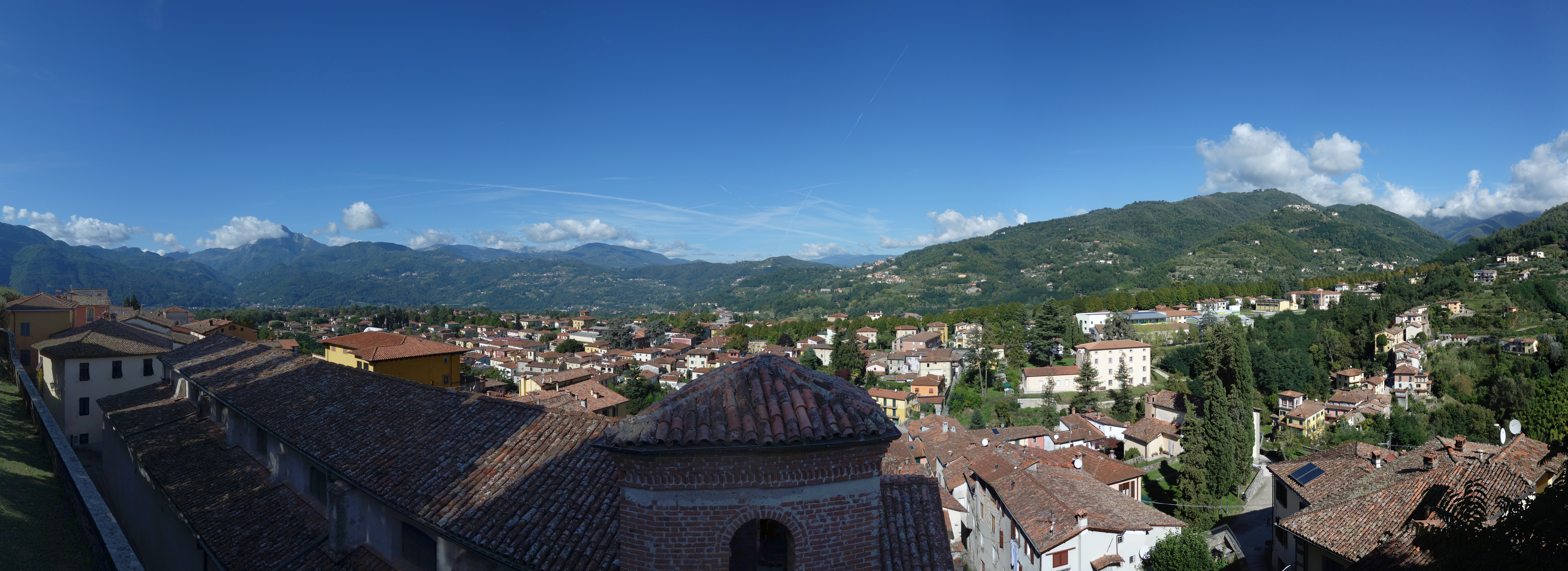
A view of Barga from Barga Cathedral.

== Main sights ==
Main sights include:

- Collegiate Church of San Cristoforo (the duomo of Barga) (11th-16th centuries), the main example of Romanesque architecture in the Serchio Valley. Of the original church, built in local limestone, parts of the façade remain. The interior has a nave and two aisles. It houses a large (3.5 m) wooden statue of St. Christopher, patron of the city. The pulpit (12th century) was designed by Guido Bigarelli da Como, with four red marble columns resting on lion sculptures. The campanile contains three bells, the oldest of which dates to the 16th century.
- Arringo, a large lawn between the Duomo and the Palazzo Pretorio
- Loggia del Podestà (14th century): now houses the Museo Civico del Territorio "Antonio Mordini"
- San Francesco, church with several works by Andrea della Robbia
- Santissima Annunziata church
- Santissimo Crocifisso 15th-century church
- The town's railway station Barga-Gallicano

== Sport ==
In 1991 the local sports centre, Il Ciocco, hosted the second edition of UCI Mountain Bike & Trials World Championships.

== Sister cities ==
- Hayange, France
- Gällivare, Sweden
- Orleans, Massachusetts, United States
- Prestonpans, Scotland
- Cockenzie, Scotland
- Port Seton, Scotland
- Longniddry, Scotland

== Notable people ==
- Lorenzo Baldisseri, archbishop
- George Biagi, professional rugby player
- Nadia Centoni, volleyball player
- Baccio Ciarpi, painter
- Gualtiero Jacopetti, film director
- Johnny Moscardini, football player
- Antonio Nardini, historian
- Paolo Nutini, singer-songwriter
- Giovanni Pascoli, poet
- Paolo Riani, architect
- John E. Rigali, sculptor
- Frank Viviano, journalist and author
- Swietlan Kraczyna, printmaker and painter
- Francesco Farioli, football manager
