= Santissima Annunziata, Rubiera =

Church building in Rubiera, Italy

Coordinates: 44.653128°N 10.783148°E

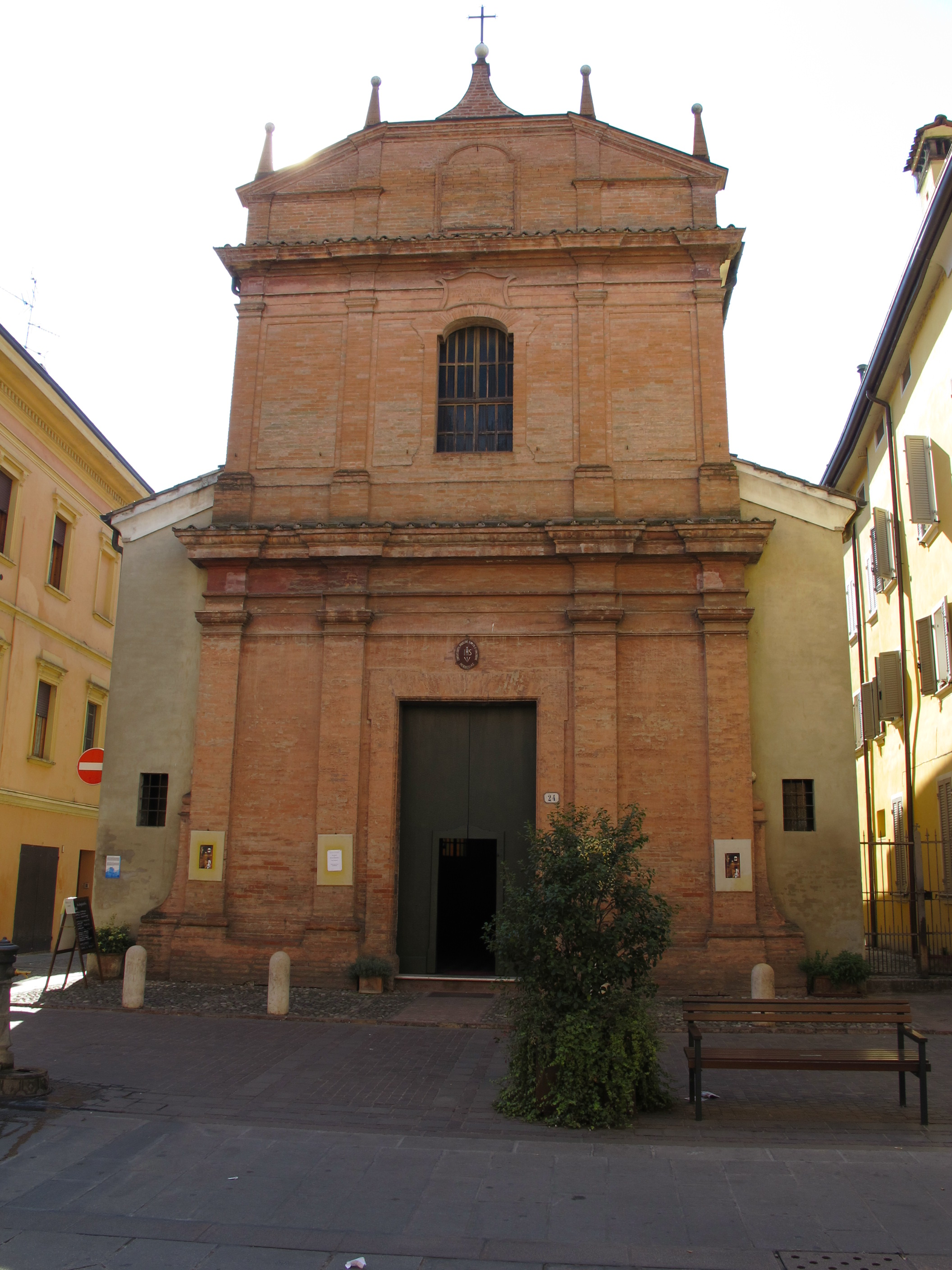
Facade of the church

Santissima Annunziata, or merely the Annunziata, is a Baroque-style, Roman Catholic chapel-church, or oratory, located in Rubiera, province of Reggio Emilia, region of Emilia Romagna, Italy.

== History ==
The church, located in front of the Sacrati family palace, was built between 1710 and 1713. The facade was built in 1750 and the main altar in 1759. The altar on the left is dedicated to St Roch with a canvas (circa 1730) attributed to the school of Guercino. The church was suppressed in 1799. In 1808, the new Brotherhood of Santissimo Sacramento (Holy Sacrament), took the place of the former Annunziata in care of the church. By 1915, the church had become a store for forage products; after the second world war it underwent restoration.
