= Santissima Annunziata, Barga =

Church in Barga, Italy

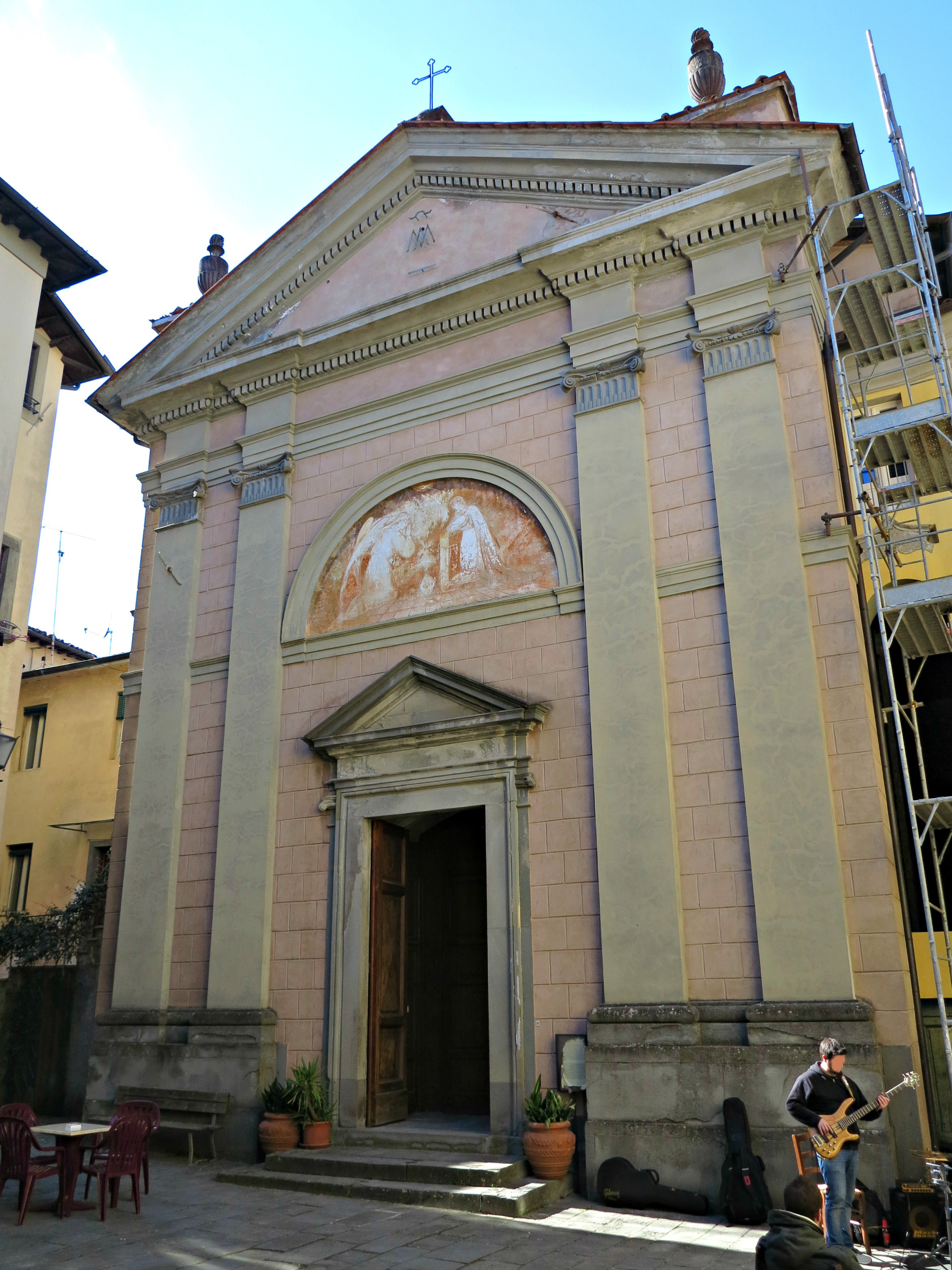
The facade of the church

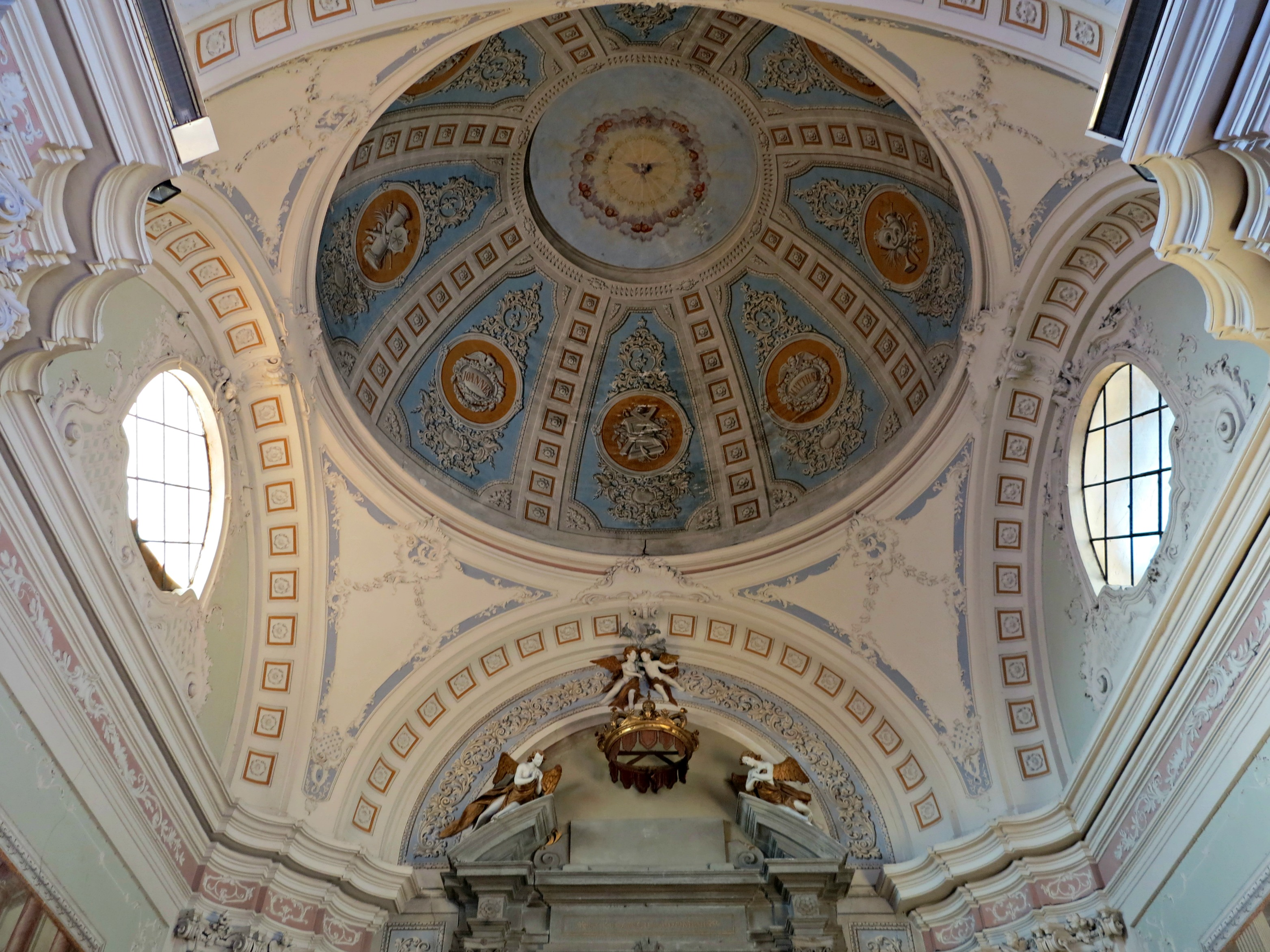
The interior with the dome

The church of the Santissima Annunziata is a 16th-century, Roman Catholic church located in the center of Barga, region of Tuscany, Italy.

== History ==
The church was built in a Latin-cross layout in 1595 around a venerated icon of the Virgin. An altarpiece on the right has a canvas depicting a Madonna and child and Saints by Baccio Ciarpi. In the choir are frescoes depicting the Marriage of the Virgin and Presentation at the Temple.
