= Ramova Theater =

- U.S. National Register of Historic Places
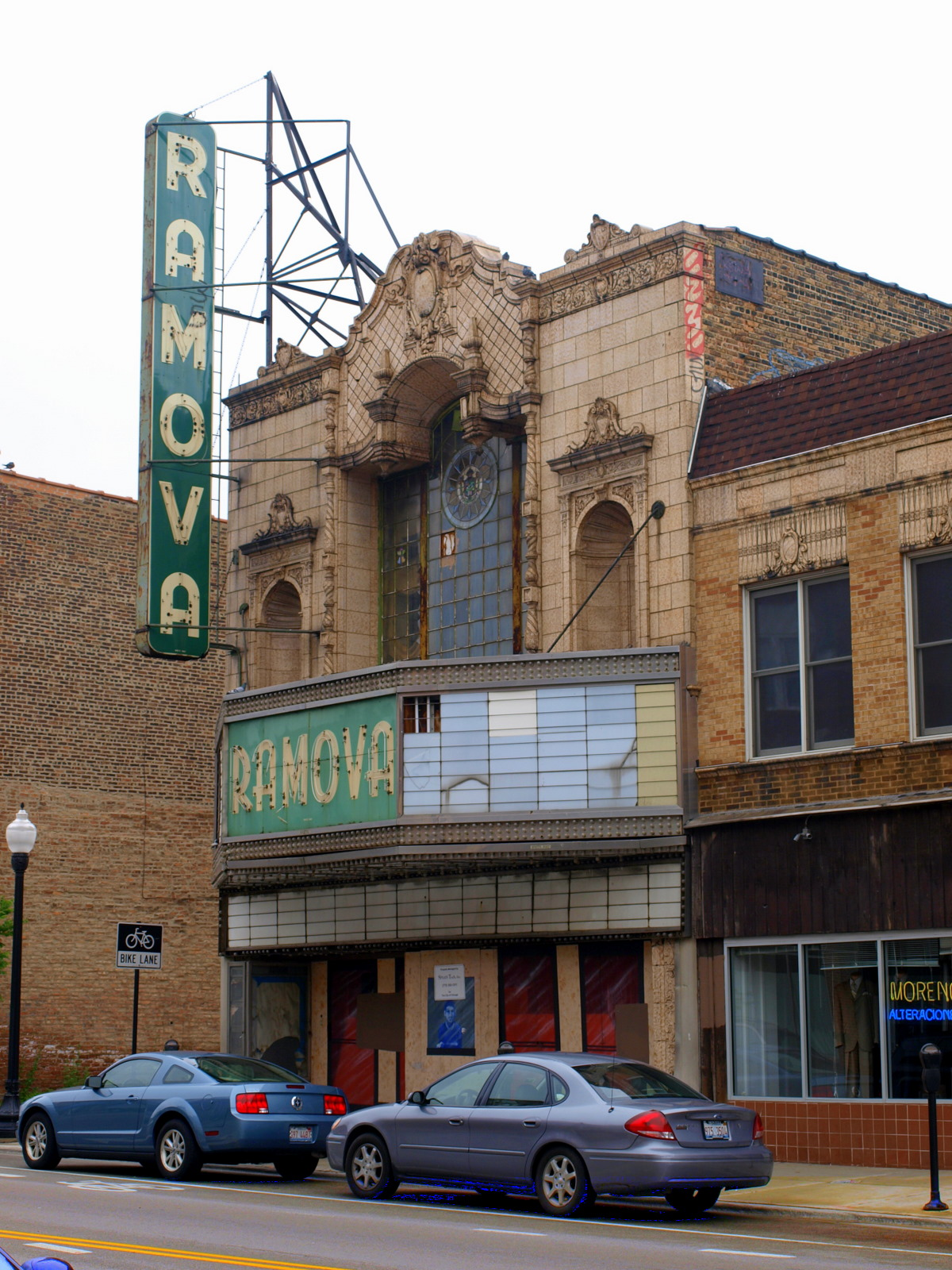

- Location within Chicago metropolitan area Location within Illinois Location within the United States
- Location: 3508-3518 South Halsted St., Chicago, Illinois
- Coordinates: 41°49′49″N 87°38′47″W
- Built: 1929
- Architect: Myer O. Nathan
- Architectural style: Neoclassical, Spanish Revival
- NRHP reference No.: 100007223
- Added to NRHP: December 17, 2021

The Ramova Theater is a historic movie theater at 3508-3518 South Halsted Street in the Bridgeport neighborhood of Chicago, Illinois. Businessman Jokūbas Maskoliūnas, one of the many Lithuanian immigrants who settled in Bridgeport in the early twentieth century, built the theater in 1929. The theater opened with 1,300 seats, making it the largest in the neighborhood, and was built with a commercial block and apartments in the same building. Its name, which was chosen by the winner of a local newspaper contest, means "peaceful place" or "serene place" in Lithuanian. Architect Myer O. Nathan designed the building as an atmospheric theater, a style of theater meant to transplant audiences to a distant place or time; in the case of the Ramova, its interior used false fronts and balconies to resemble a Spanish courtyard. Nathan's design included elements of Neoclassical and Spanish Revival architecture, such as extensive terra cotta ornamentation, a frieze spanning the length of the building, and plaster detailing on the interior.

In 2001, the City of Chicago purchased the building and funded roof repairs. The theater was added to the National Register of Historic Places on December 17, 2021. Landmarks Illinois named the theater one of four recipients of the 2024 Richard H. Driehaus Foundation Preservation Awards.

Tyler Nevius purchased the Ramova and an adjacent lot from the City of Chicago for $1 in 2017. Together with 55 partners and 49 investors, including Chicago natives Quincy Jones, Jennifer Hudson and Chance the Rapper, he undertook an extensive renovation, resulting in a live music space along with a craft brewery and a restaurant and beer garden, that held a grand reopening event on December 31, 2023.
