= Santissimo Crocifisso, Barga =

Church in Barga, Italy

Coordinates: 44°4′26.65″N 10°29′7.5″E

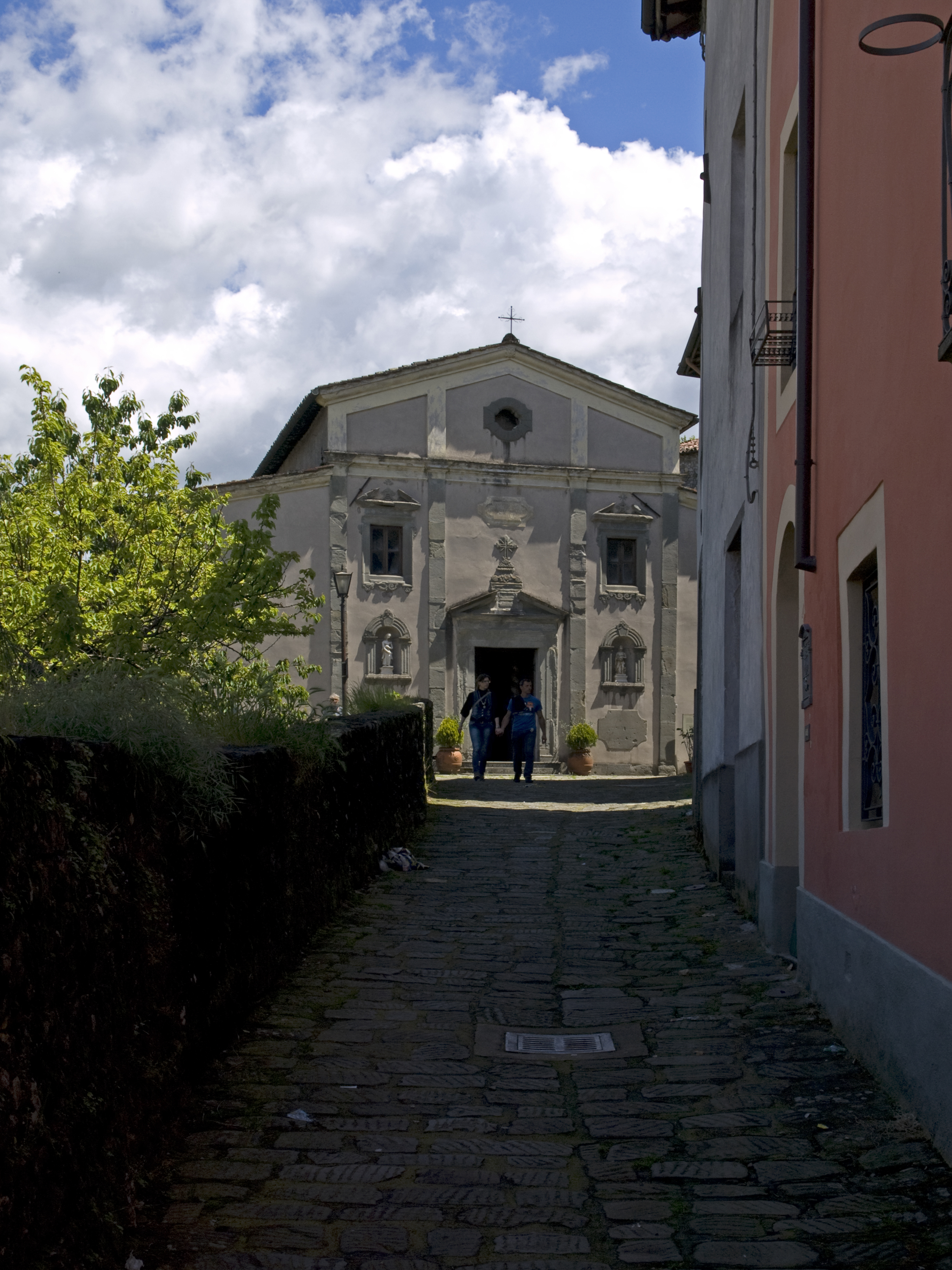
The exterior of the church

The church of the Santissimo Crocifisso is a 15th-century, Roman Catholic church located in the centre of Barga, region of Tuscany, Italy.

== History ==
Construction of the church began in the 13th century, but continued for nearly 300 years. In 1470, the church was the refuge of Franciscans from San Bernardino di Nebbiana, which appeared to have been afflicted by the plague.

The niches in the facade, completed in 1597, has two marble statues: St John the Baptist and St Catherine of Alexandria. The interior is divided in a nave in two aisles. The interior is highly decorated in stucco and gilding. The choir has 15th century wooden carved stalls.
