= Santi Faustino e Giovita, Rubiera =

Church in Emilia-Romagna, Italy

Coordinates: 44°40′45″N 10°46′53″E

The church of Santi Faustino e Giovita, also called just San Faustino, is a Romanesque-style, Roman Catholic church in the town of Rubiera, province of Reggio Emilia, region of Emilia Romagna, Italy.

== History ==
The commission for a church at this site is attributed to the Countess Matilde di Canossa. The church is mentioned in documents by the bishop of Reggio Emilia in the year 945 and again in 980.

The church has been reconstructed over the ages. The facade (1870) was designed by Professor Faccioli of Bologna. The church building has three apses in Romanesque style. The interior architecture has been extensively refurbished. The main altar has a tabernacle with a 13th-century fresco of Madonna with Child and a painting depicting Saints Faustino and Giovita (18th-century).
