= Santissima Annunziata, Pescia =

Church building in Pescia, Italy

Coordinates: 43°54′13.59″N 10°41′17.48″E

Santissima Annunziata is a Roman Catholic church located in Pescia, region of Tuscany, Italy.

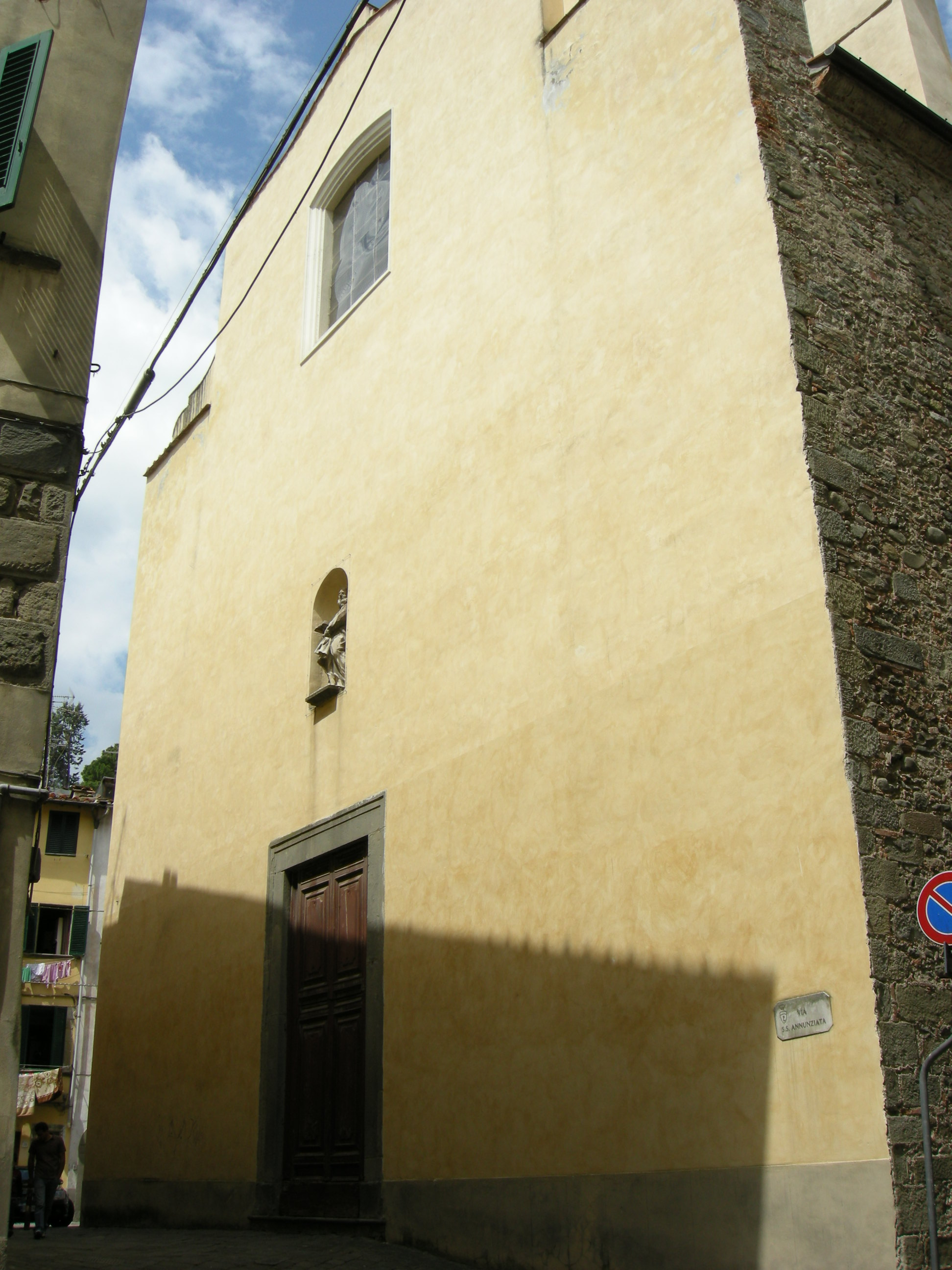
The facade of the church

== History ==
Construction of the church began in 1600, designed by Antonio Maria Ferri, and the church was affiliated with the Barnabite order, which occupied the church until 1782. Construction was interrupted in 1631 with the sweep of the plague, and work continued until the early 18th century.

The interior contains the following altarpieces:

- St Carlo Borromeo administers the sacraments to those afflicted by plague by Baldassare Franceschini
- The city of Pescia pledged in veneration to the Virgin during the scourge of 1631 by Carlo Sacconi
- St Filippo Neri in ecstasy before Madonna and Angels (1727) by Marcantonio Franceschini
- Madonna del Soccorso by 15th century artist.
