= Santissima Annunziata, Circello =

Church building in Circello, Italy

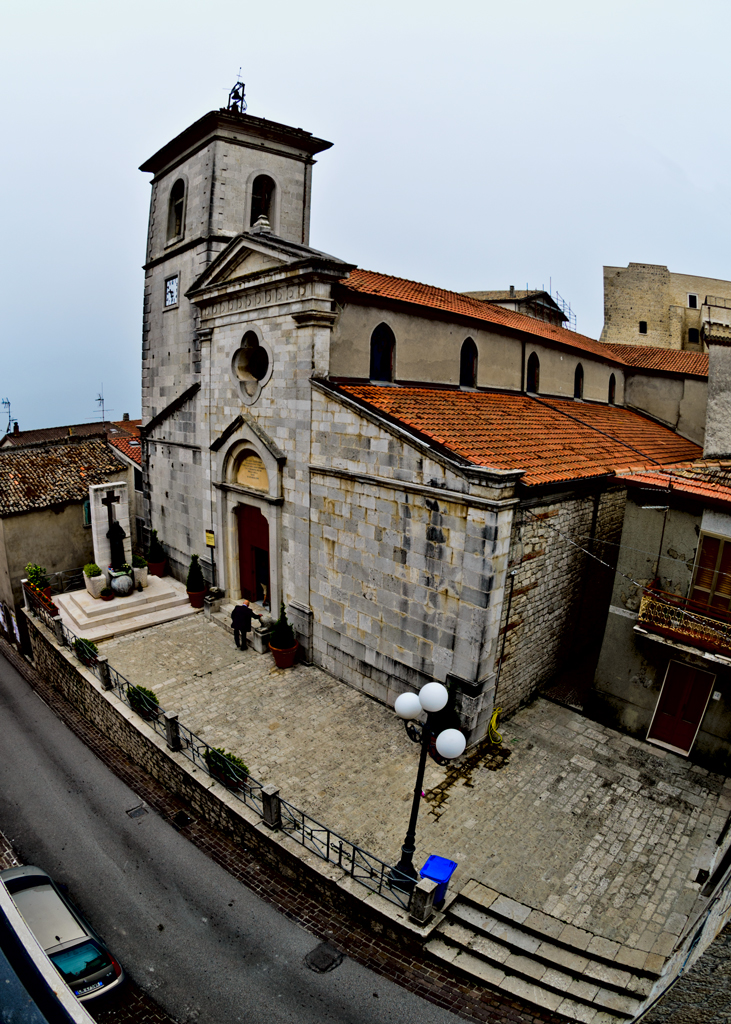
Annunziata church

The Church of the Santissima Annunziata, also called the Chiesa Madre Annuziata is a 19th-century Roman Catholic church in Circello, Province of Benevento, region of Campania, Italy. The church was rebuilt after earthquakes in 1688 and again in 1882.

== History ==
Originally built as a chapel for the lords of the castle, the church was enlarged to a classical cross layout. The bell-tower collapsed in 1906, and was rebuilt in 1933.

Inside the church there are various chapels with niches for the statues of San Giuseppe with Baby Jesus, Archangel St Michael, St Vincent Ferrer, St Alphonso M., the Sacred Heart of Jesus, and the Assumption of the Virgin. Above the central altar is the Crucifix by an unknown 16th century sculptor and a large canvas of the Annunciation by an unknown artist.
