= Rubiera =

- Comune
- Comune di Rubiera
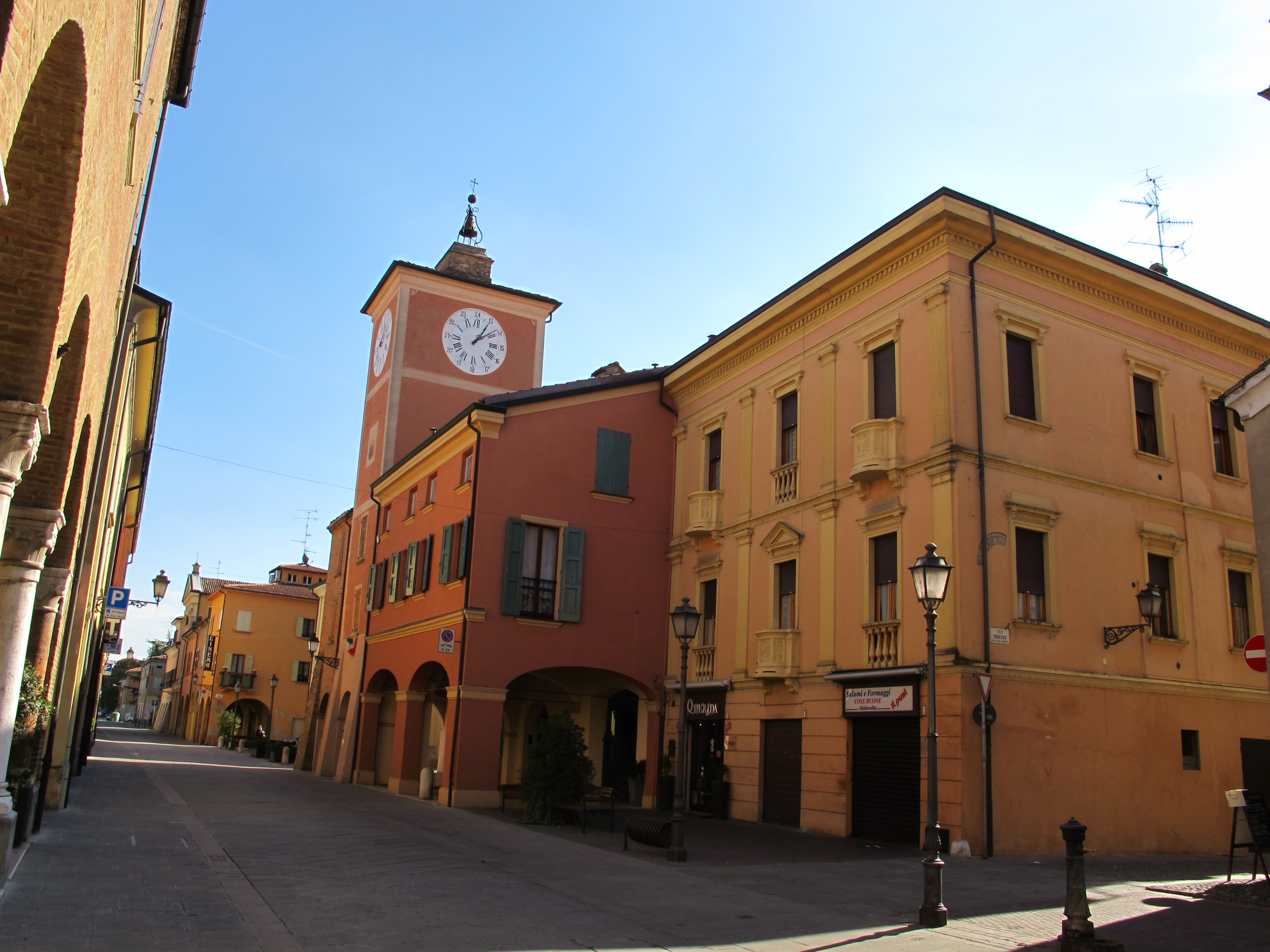
- View of Rubiera.

- Coat of arms

- Location within Italy Location within Emilia-Romagna
- Coordinates: 44°39′N 10°47′E
- Country: Italy
- Region: Emilia-Romagna
- Province: Reggio Emilia (RE)
- Frazioni: Fontana, San Faustino, Sant'Agata

Government
  - Mayor: Emanuele Cavallaro

Area
  - Total: 25.3 km^{2} (9.8 sq mi)
- Elevation: 41 m (135 ft)

Population (31 December 2016)
  - Total: 14,882
  - Density: 588/km^{2} (1,520/sq mi)
- Demonym: Rubieresi
- Time zone: UTC+1 (CET)
  - Summer (DST): UTC+2 (CEST)
- Postal code: 42048
- Dialing code: 0522
- Patron saint: Saint Blaise
- Saint day: February 3
- Website: Official website

Rubiera (Reggiano: Rubēra) is a comune (municipality) in the Province of Reggio Emilia in the Italian region Emilia-Romagna, located on the Via Emilia about 50 kilometres (31 mi) northwest of Bologna and about 13 kilometres (8 mi) southeast of Reggio Emilia.

== History ==
The original name of the city was Corte de Herberia, probably derived from the Celtic er-beria, meaning "in the middle of the plain". The Roman emperors Gallienus and Valerianus built a bridge over the Secchia river at this location in AD 259.

The first historical mention of Rubiera is from 915, at which time it was a fief of the Supponidi family; the city later became a fief of the Obertenghi family. After a period of decline, it recovered some importance in the 12th century under the comune of Reggio Emilia, due to its strategic position and the fact that the city had a castrum (castle) and massive walls. At later times it was a possession of the House of Este, a Papal possession, and part of the Duchy of Modena and Reggio, during which period the castle was used as a prison.

Among the churches in the community are:

- Santissima Annunziata (18th century)
- Santi Faustino e Giovita (10th century)
- Sant'Agata a Casale (16th century)
- Parish church (18th century)

== Sports ==
Rubiera is the hometown of Stefano Baldini, European and Olympic marathon champion. Rubiera's handball team (Pallamano Secchia) has played in the Italian serie A every year since 1982.

== Twin towns ==
- Bjelovar, Croatia
- Neulingen, Germany, since 1991
- Györújbarát, Hungary, since 2005
