= Christina Annunziata =

American medical oncologist

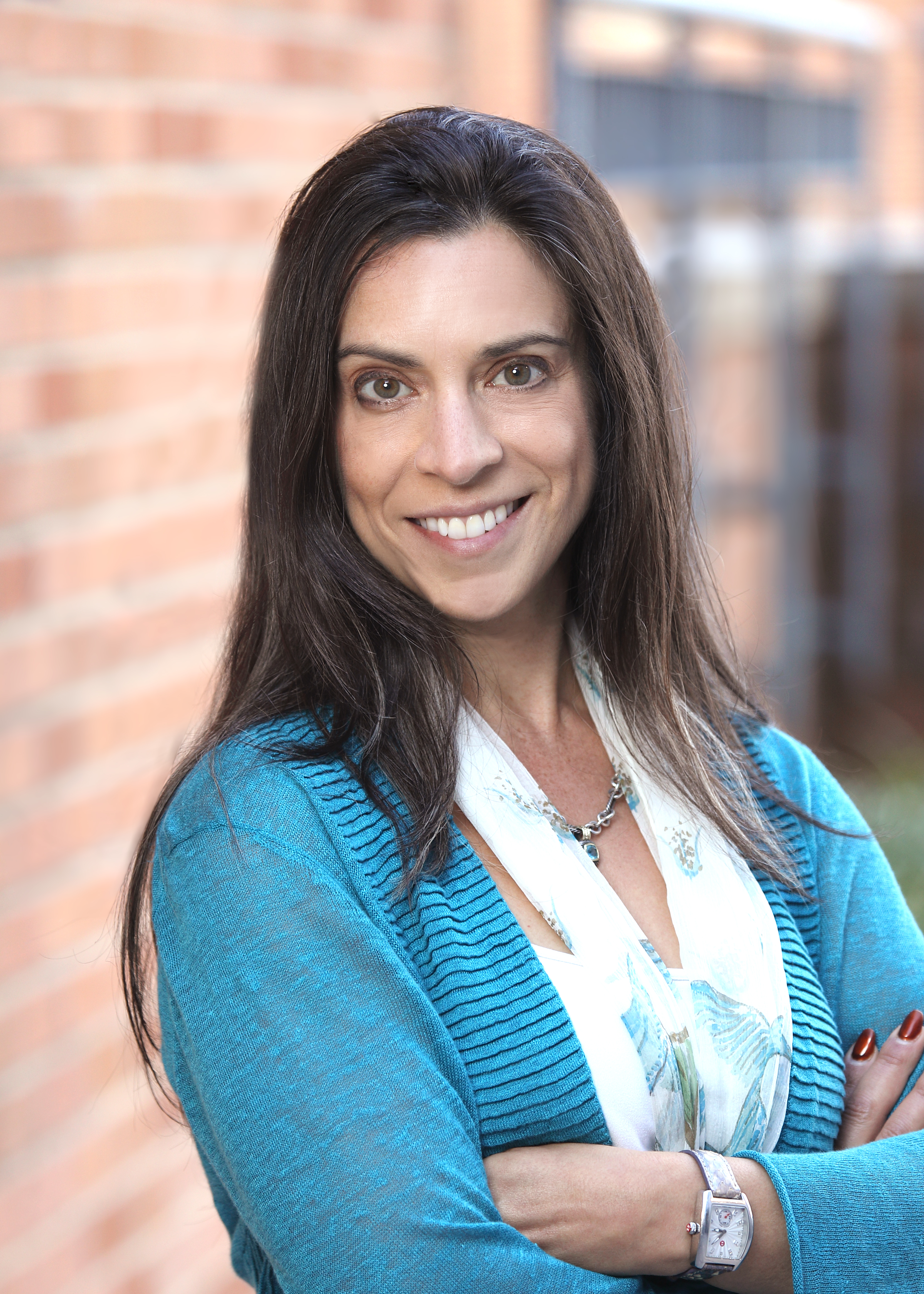
- Education: Georgetown University Medical School (MD, PhD)
- Scientific career
- Fields: Medical oncology
- Workplaces: National Cancer Institute, American Cancer Society
- Thesis: CD40 signaling Hodgkin's disease (2000)

Christina Messineo Annunziata is an American medical oncologist researching molecular signal transduction in ovarian cancer. She is Senior Vice President, Extramural Discovery Science at the American Cancer Society, and volunteers in the National Cancer Institute's women's malignancies branch.

== Education ==
Annunziata is a graduate of Georgetown University Medical School where she also completed graduate school and residency training in internal medicine. Her dissertation was titled CD40 signaling Hodgkin's disease.

She came to the National Cancer Institute (NCI) as a postdoctoral researcher for medical oncology training in the medical oncology branch. Annunziata joined the NCI laboratory of Louis M. Staudt in the metabolism branch to investigate NF-kappaB signaling in multiple myeloma. She returned to the medical oncology branch to extend her study of these molecular pathways in the ovarian cancer model. She researched in the clinic of Elise C. Kohn.

== Career and research ==
Annunziata maintains her clinical focus in the translational clinical studies of ovarian cancer. Her career at the NCI spanned 2002-2023 where she reached the rank of senior investigator and head of the NCI translational genomics section. She directed clinical operations for the women's malignancies branch. Annunziata holds board certification for the practice of medical oncology. Annunziata is a participating member in the NRG Oncology cooperative group, the American Association for Cancer Research, the American Society for Clinical Oncology, and the Society of Gynecologic Oncology. She served as course director for the Women's Malignancies Lecture Series in the Women's Malignancies Branch, and Associate Editor for the international journal, BMC Cancer.

In 2023, Annunziata was named Senior Vice President, Extramural Discovery Science, at the American Cancer Society.
