= Luchino Visconti =

Italian theatre, opera, and cinema director (1906-1976)

Don Luchino Visconti
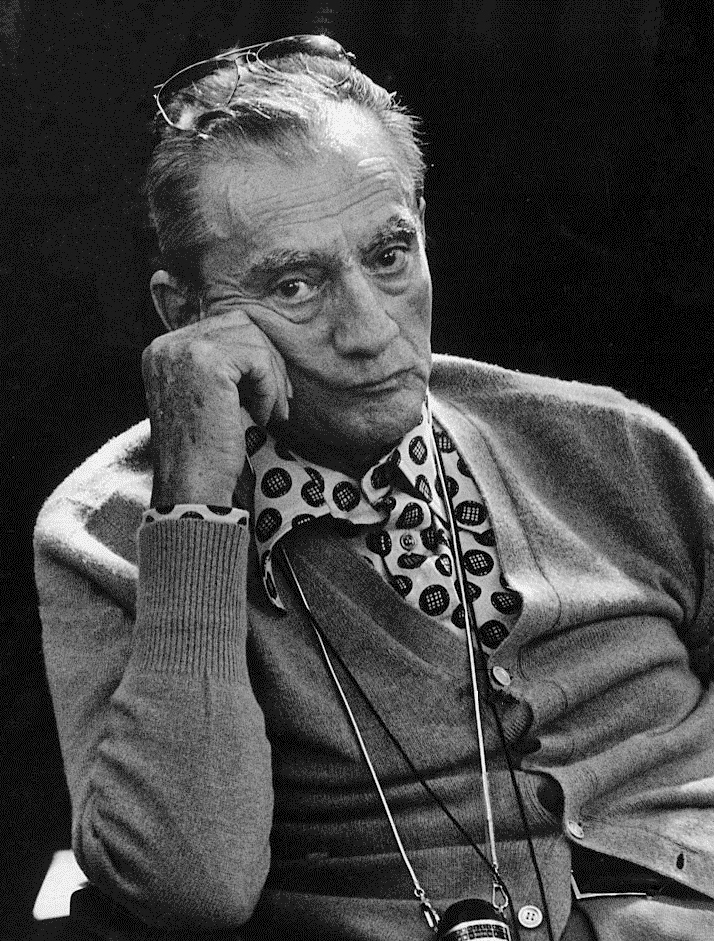
- Visconti in 1972
- Born: 2 November 1906; Milan, Kingdom of Italy
- Died: 17 March 1976 (aged 69); Rome, Italy
- Occupations: Director; screenwriter
- Years active: 1943–1976
- Notable work: Ossessione; La Terra Trema; Senso; Rocco and His Brothers; The Leopard; The Damned; Death in Venice; Ludwig; Conversation Piece
- Title: Count of Lonate Pozzolo
- Partner: See below
- Parent(s): Giuseppe Visconti di Modrone, Duke of Grazzano Visconti, Count of Lonate Pozzolo (father); Carla Erba (mother)
- Relatives: Eriprando Visconti (nephew); Uberto Pasolini (grandnephew)
- Family: Visconti di Modrone

Luchino Visconti di Modrone, Count of Lonate Pozzolo (Italian: [luˈkiːno viˈskonti di moˈdroːne]; 2 November 1906 – 17 March 1976) was an Italian filmmaker, theatre and opera director, and screenwriter. He was one of the fathers of cinematic neorealism but later moved towards luxurious, sweeping epic films, dealing with the themes of beauty, decadence, death, and European history, especially the decay of the nobility and the bourgeoisie. Critic Jonathan Jones wrote that "no one did as much to shape Italian cinema as Luchino Visconti.”

Born into a Milanese noble family with close ties to the artistic world, Visconti began his career in France as an assistant director to Jean Renoir. His 1943 directorial debut, Ossessione, was condemned by the Fascist regime for its unvarnished depictions of working-class characters but was later renowned as a pioneering work of Italian cinema, generally regarded as the first neorealist film. During World War II, he served in the Italian resistance, and afterwards was active in left-wing politics.

Visconti's best-known films include Senso (1954) and The Leopard (1963), which are historical melodramas adapted from Italian literary classics, the gritty drama Rocco and His Brothers (1960), and his "German Trilogy" – The Damned (1969), Death in Venice (1971) and Ludwig (1973). He was also an accomplished director of operas and stage plays, both in Italy and abroad, and held a close association with La Scala in his hometown of Milan.

Visconti received several notable accolades, including both the Palme d'Or (for The Leopard) and the Golden Lion (for 1965's Sandra), the latter out of five total nominations. He won the David di Donatello for Best Director twice and the Nastro d'Argento for Best Director four times, and was both an Oscar and BAFTA Award nominee. Six of Visconti's films are on the list of 100 Italian films to be saved. Many of his works are regarded as highly-influential to future generations of filmmakers, including Francis Ford Coppola and Martin Scorsese.

== Early life ==
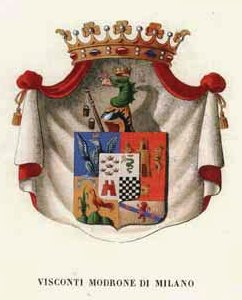
Family arms

Luchino Visconti was born into a prominent noble Visconti di Modrone family in Milan, a collateral branch of Visconti of Milan, one of seven children of Giuseppe Visconti di Modrone, Duke of Grazzano Visconti and Count of Lonate Pozzolo, and his wife Carla (née Erba, heiress to Erba Pharmaceuticals). He was formally known as Count don Luchino Visconti di Modrone, and his family is a branch of the Visconti of Milan where they ruled from 1277 to 1447, initially as lords, then as dukes.

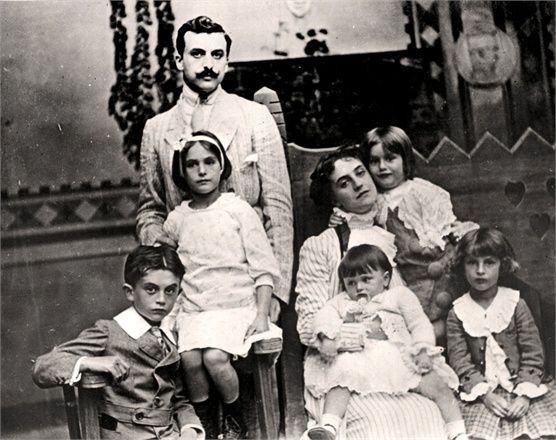
Visconti (far left) with his family, circa 1912

Visconti grew up in the Milanese family seat, the Palazzo Visconti di Modrone in Via Cerva, as well as on the family estate, Grazzano Visconti Castle near Vigolzone. He was baptized and raised in the Roman Catholic church. After his parents separated in the early 1920s, his mother moved with her younger children, including him, to her own house in Milan, as well as to her summer residence, Villa Erba in Cernobbio on Lake Como. The father, as chamberlain of King Victor Emmanuel III of Italy, also owned a villa in Rome that Luchino later inherited and lived in for decades.

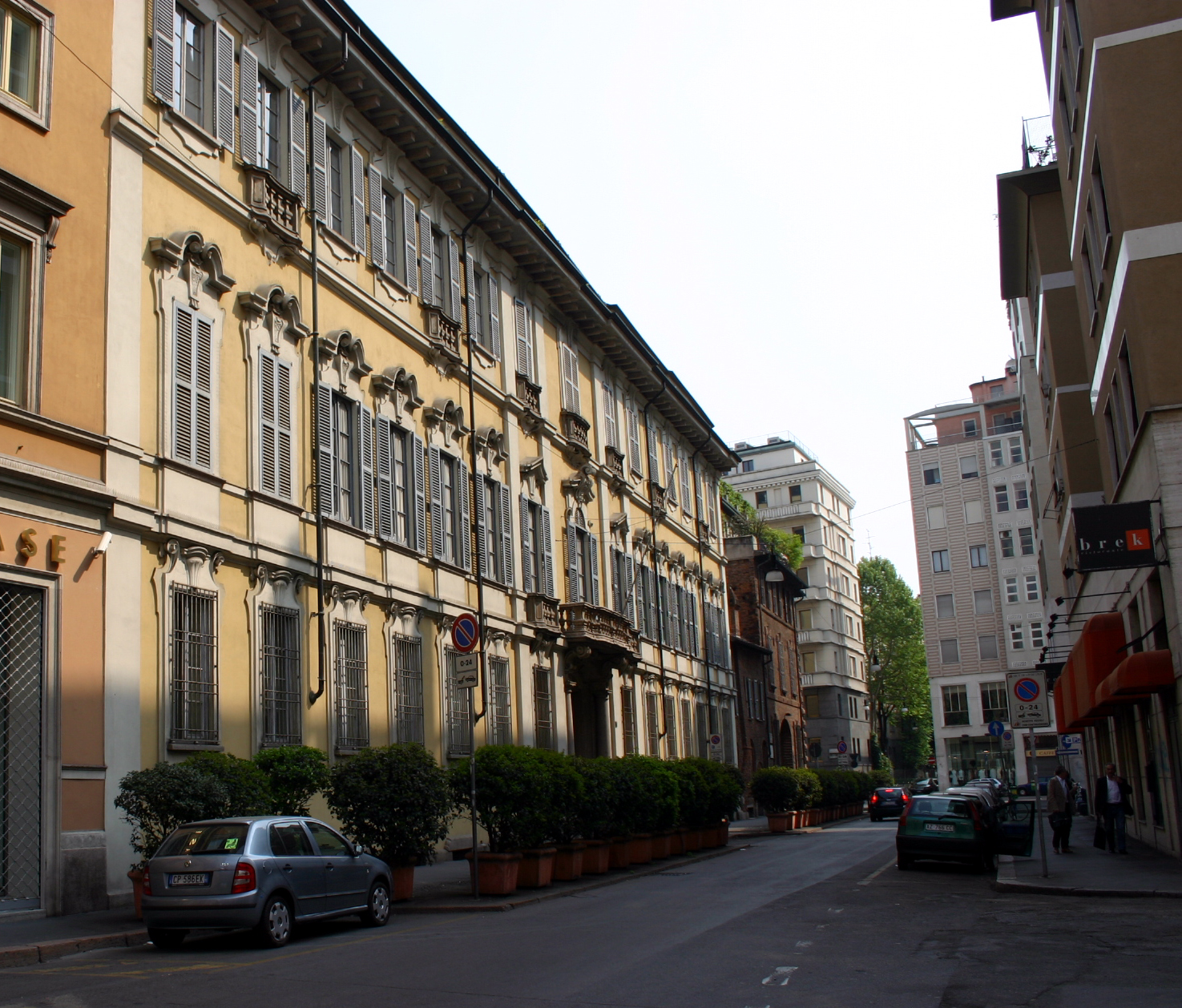
Palazzo Visconti di Modrone in Milan

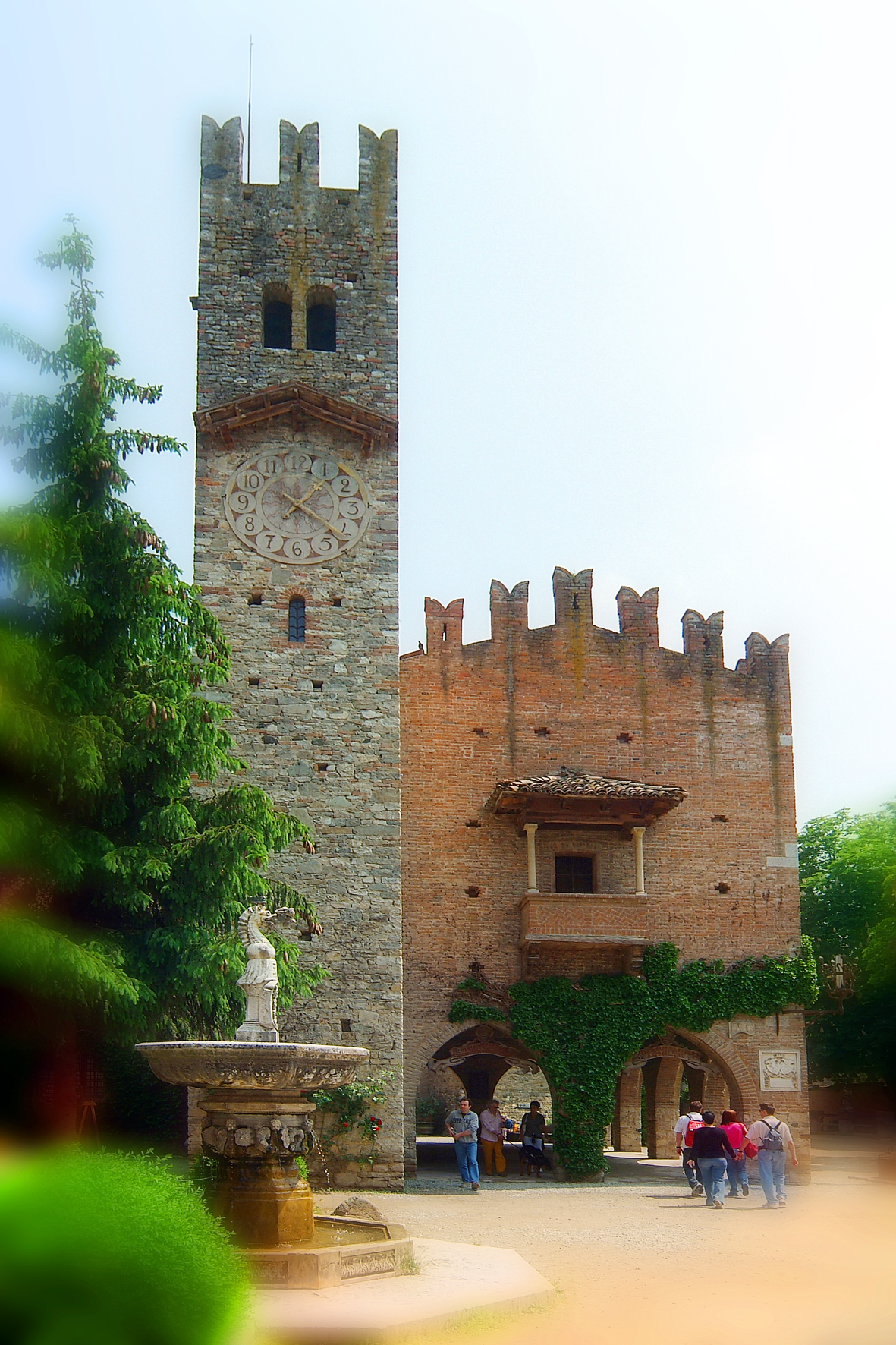
Grazzano Visconti Castle

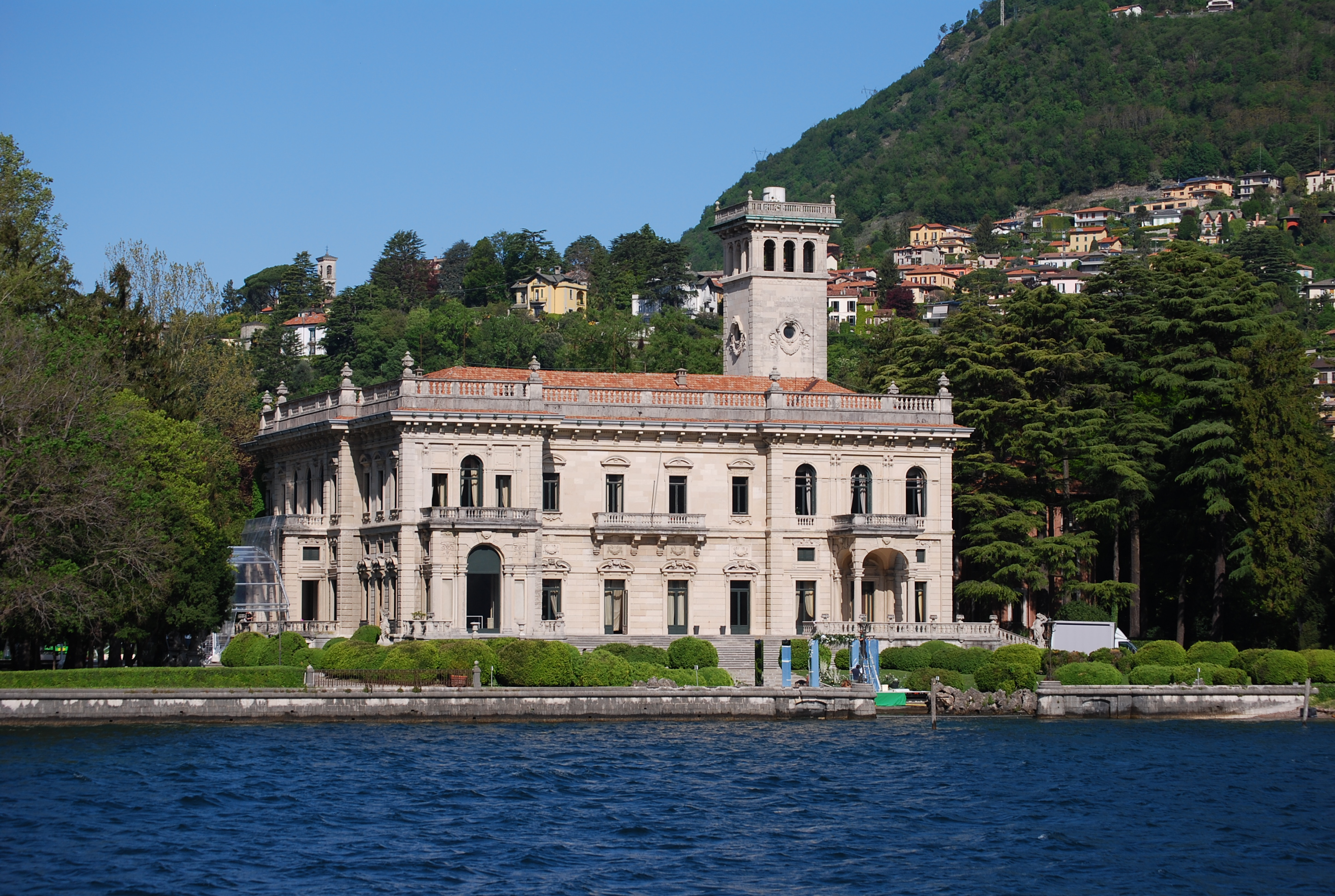
Villa Erba on Lake Como

In his early years, Visconti was exposed to art, music and theatre: The Palazzo Visconti di Modrone in Milan, where he grew up, had its own small private theatre and the children participated in its performances. The family also had their own box in the La Scala opera house. Luchino studied cello with the Italian cellist and composer Lorenzo de Paolis (1890–1965) and met the composer Giacomo Puccini, the conductor Arturo Toscanini and the writer Gabriele D'Annunzio. Visconti found literature by reading Proust's In Search of Lost Time, later a lifelong film project that he never realized. Before he started his film career, he was passionate about training racehorses in his own stable. He was engaged to Princess Irma of Windisch-Graetz, but this raised concerns with her father, Prince Hugo, and Visconti broke the engagement off in 1935.

== Wartime resistance activity ==
During World War II, Visconti joined the Italian Communist Party, which he considered to be the only effective opponent of Italian Fascism. While he had, in his early years, been impressed by such aesthetic aspects of the solemn parades of the National Fascist Party as marching in columns in boots and uniform, he had now come to hate the Mussolini regime. He accused the bourgeoisie of treason to tyranny; following the Badoglio Proclamation, he began working with the Italian resistance. He supported the communists' partisan fight at the risk of death; his villa in Rome became a meeting place for oppositional artists.

After the king's flight in the autumn of 1943 and the intervention of the Germans, he went into hiding in the mountains, at Settefrati, under the nom de guerre Alfredo Guidi. Visconti helped English and American prisoners of war hide after they had escaped, and also gave shelter to partisans in his house in Rome, with the help of actress María Denis. After the German occupation of Rome in April 1944, Visconti was arrested and detained by the anti-partisan Pietro Koch and sentenced to execution by firing squad. He was only saved from death by Denis's last-minute intervention. After the war, Visconti testified against Koch, who was himself convicted and executed.

== Career ==
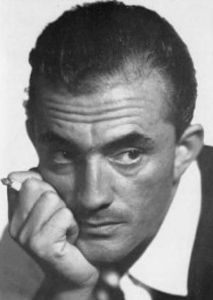
Luchino Visconti

=== Films ===
He began his film-making career as a set dresser on Jean Renoir's Partie de campagne (1936) through the intercession of their common friend Coco Chanel. After a short tour of the United States, where he visited Hollywood, he returned to Italy to be Renoir's assistant again, this time for Tosca (1941), a production that was interrupted and later completed by German director Karl Koch.

Together with fellow members of the Milanese film journal Cinema - Gianni Puccini, Antonio Pietrangeli and Giuseppe De Santis - Visconti wrote the screenplay for his first film as director: Ossessione (Obsession, 1943), one of the first examples of neorealist (involving real locations and regular people) movies and an unofficial adaptation of the novel The Postman Always Rings Twice. The premiere of Ossessione took place at a film festival hosted by Vittorio Mussolini (son of Benito), who was the national arbiter for cinema and other arts, and the editor of Cinema. Though prior to the premiere their working relationship was positive, upon viewing the film Vittorio stormed out of the theatre exclaiming: "This is not Italy!", according to the account of Cinema group contributor Aldo Scagnetti. The film was subsequently suppressed by the fascist regime, to the extent that the first public showing of the film in Rome only occurred in May 1945.

In 1948, he wrote and directed La terra trema (The Earth Trembles), based on the novel I Malavoglia by Giovanni Verga. Visconti continued working throughout the 1950s, but he veered away from the neorealist path with his 1954 film, Senso, shot in colour. Based on the novella by Camillo Boito, it is set in Austrian-occupied Venice in 1866. In this film, Visconti combines realism and romanticism as a way to break away from neorealism. However, as one biographer notes, "Visconti without neorealism is like Lang without expressionism and Eisenstein without formalism". He describes the film as the "most Viscontian" of all Visconti's films. Visconti returned to neorealism once more with Rocco e i suoi fratelli (Rocco and His Brothers, 1960), the story of Southern Italians who migrate to Milan hoping to find financial stability. In 1961, he was a member of the jury at the 2nd Moscow International Film Festival.

Turning away from neo-realism, Visconti created an unmistakable visual language in his films from the 1960s onwards. Thanks to his unique blend of aristocratic and upper-class origins, communist political convictions and brilliant social analysis, he created masterpieces of film history in The Leopard (1963), The Damned (1969), Death in Venice (1971) and Ludwig (1972). Throughout the 1960s, Visconti's films became more personal. Il Gattopardo (The Leopard, 1963) is based on Lampedusa's novel of the same name about the decline of the Sicilian aristocracy at the time of the Risorgimento, where the change of times becomes visible in two of the main characters: Don Fabrizio Corbera, Prince of Salina (Burt Lancaster) appears patriarchal but humane, while Don Calogero Sedara (Paolo Stoppa), a shrewd entrepreneur and social climber from the village, appears submissive, but foxy and brutal at the same time, a mafia-like type of the future. The tension arises from the marriage of their relatives of the next generation, combined with the fall of the old Bourbon rule and the rise of a united Italy. This film was distributed in America and Britain by Twentieth-Century Fox, which deleted important scenes. Visconti repudiated the Twentieth-Century Fox version.

It was not until The Damned (1969) that Visconti received a nomination for an Academy Award for Best Original Screenplay. The film, one of Visconti's better-known works, concerns a German industrialist's family which begins to disintegrate during the Nazi consolidation of power in the 1930s. The film opened to widespread critical acclaim, but also faced controversy from rating boards for its sexual content, including depictions of homosexuality, pedophilia, rape, and incest. In the United States, the film was given an X rating. The avant-garde filmmaker Rainer Werner Fassbinder praised it as his favourite movie. Its decadence and lavish beauty are characteristic of Visconti's aesthetic − very visible also in the movie Death in Venice (1971) that adapted the daring novella Death in Venice published in 1912 by Thomas Mann.

Visconti's final film was The Innocent (1976), in which he returns to his recurring interest in infidelity and betrayal.

=== Theatre ===
Visconti was also a celebrated theatre and opera director. During the years 1946 to 1960, he directed many performances of the Rina Morelli-Paolo Stoppa Company with actor Vittorio Gassman as well as many celebrated productions of operas.

Visconti's love of opera is evident in the 1954 Senso, where the beginning of the film shows scenes from the fourth act of Il trovatore, which were filmed at the Teatro La Fenice in Venice. Beginning when he directed a production at Milan's Teatro alla Scala of La vestale in December 1954, his career included a famous revival of La traviata at La Scala in 1955 with Maria Callas and an equally famous Anna Bolena (also at La Scala) in 1957 with Callas. A significant 1958 Royal Opera House (London) production of Verdi's five-act Italian version of Don Carlos (with Jon Vickers) followed, along with a Macbeth in Spoleto in 1958 and a famous black-and-white Il trovatore with scenery and costumes by Filippo Sanjust at the Royal Opera House in 1964. In 1966 Visconti's luscious Falstaff for the Vienna State Opera conducted by Leonard Bernstein was critically acclaimed. On the other hand, his austere 1969 Simon Boccanegra with the singers clothed in geometrical costumes provoked controversy.

== Filmmaking style and themes ==
In the aftermath of World War II he became one of the founding fathers of the Italian neorealistic film movement that focused on challenging economic and conditions, and how it affected the psyche of the underclass. Visconti came from nobility, was highly educated and was never in financial lack. His films reflected that tension. In fact, Visconti said he felt he came from a world long ago, that of the previous (19th) century.

In the film The Leopard, he addressed the decline of an old social order and the rise of "modern times". He did not see his opulent flashbacks as an escape into imaginary, lost worlds, but rather as the deciphering of signs. He wanted to put his finger on the signs of profound historical changes which would only become visible later. He searched world literature for relevant works to show the discrepancies between generations and their world views, as a task of realism in art. When he was accused of decadence, he recalled Thomas Mann and his way of creating art.

== Personal life ==
In later years, Visconti made no secret of his homosexuality, although he remained a devout Catholic throughout his life. He commented in 1971, "I am a Catholic, I was born a Catholic, I was baptized a Catholic. I cannot change what I am, I cannot easily become a Protestant. My ideas may be unorthodox, but I am still a Catholic." While his first 3-year-relationship from 1936 with the photographer Horst P. Horst remained discreet because of the prejudices of the time, he later showed up openly in the company of his lovers, among them the director and producer Franco Zeffirelli, and the actor Udo Kier. His last lover was the Austrian actor Helmut Berger, who played Martin in Visconti's film The Damned. Berger also appeared in Visconti's Ludwig in 1973 and Conversation Piece in 1974, along with Burt Lancaster. Zeffirelli also worked as part of the crew in production design, as assistant director, and other roles in a number of Visconti's films, operas, and theatrical productions. According to Visconti's autobiography, he and Umberto II of Italy had a romantic relationship during their youth in the 1920s.

Visconti was hostile to the protests of 1968 and did not even try to follow the movement and adopt the airs of youth, like Alberto Moravia or Pier Paolo Pasolini did, although the latter was certainly not sympathetic towards the protestors. In his view, the protesters sought change for the sake of destruction without building something new. Disgusted, he regarded the young people in their enthusiasm, outbursts of anger, parties and tumults, abstract speeches, and juggling with Mao Zedong, Karl Marx, and Che Guevara as a symbol of reaction. The emerging radical-left terrorism in Italy frightened him and made him fear the rise of a new fascism. Visconti has a grandnephew, Uberto Pasolini, who is also a filmmaker. Uberto is of no known relation to Pier Paolo Pasolini.

== Health issues and death ==
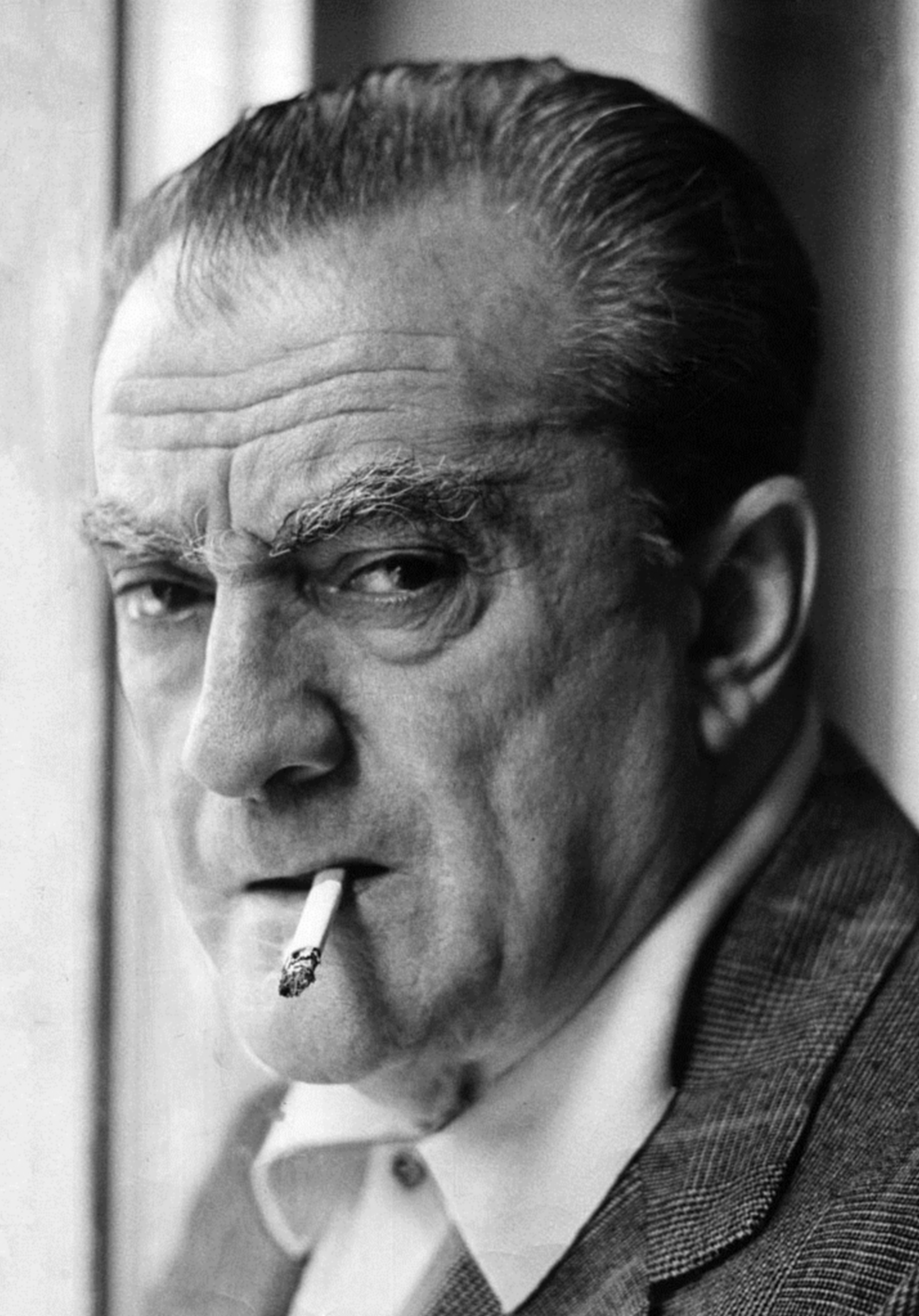
Visconti in 1972

Visconti smoked 120 cigarettes a day. He suffered a serious stroke in 1972, but continued to smoke heavily. He died in Rome of another stroke at the age of sixty-nine on 17 March 1976. The church funeral service for Visconti took place on March 19, 1976, in Sant'Ignazio di Loyola in Campo Marzio in Rome. In addition to the Visconti family, the Italian President Giovanni Leone and the actors Burt Lancaster, Claudia Cardinale, Laura Antonelli, Vittorio Gassman and Helmut Berger were present. There is a museum dedicated to the director's work in Ischia where he had his summer residence La Colombaia.

== Work ==
=== Filmography ===
==== Feature films ====
Year	Original title	International English title	Awards
1943	Ossessione	Obsession	
1948	La terra trema	The Earth Will Tremble	Special International Award — 9th Venice International Film Festival; Nominated – Grand International Prize of Venice — 9th Venice International Film Festival
1951	Bellissima	Bellissima	
1954	Senso	Senso or The Wanton Countess	Nominated – Golden Lion — 15th Venice International Film Festival
1957	Le notti bianche	White Nights	Silver Lion Prize – 18th Venice International Film Festival; Nominated – Golden Lion — 18th Venice International Film Festival
1960	Rocco e i suoi fratelli	Rocco and His Brothers	Special Prize – 21st Venice International Film Festival; FIPRESCI Prize – 21st Venice International Film Festival; 1961 Nastro d'Argento for Best Director; 1961 Nastro d'Argento for Screenplay; Nominated – Golden Lion — 21st Venice International Film Festival
1963	Il gattopardo	The Leopard	Palme d'Or – 1963 Cannes Film Festival
1965	Vaghe stelle dell'Orsa	Sandra	Golden Lion — 26th Venice International Film Festival
1967	Lo straniero	The Stranger	Nominated – Golden Lion — 28th Venice International Film Festival
1969	La caduta degli dei (Die Verdammten)	The Damned	1970 Nastro d'Argento for Best Director; Nominated – Academy Award for Best Original Screenplay — 42nd Academy Awards
1971	Morte a Venezia	Death in Venice	25th Anniversary Prize — 1971 Cannes Film Festival; David di Donatello for Best Director — 16th David di Donatello Awards; 1972 Nastro d'Argento for Best Director; Nominated — Palme d'Or — 1971 Cannes Film Festival; Nominated — BAFTA Award for Best Film — 25th British Academy Film Awards; Nominated — BAFTA Award for Best Direction — 25th British Academy Film Awards
1973	Ludwig	Ludwig	David di Donatello for Best Director — 18th David di Donatello Awards
1974	Gruppo di famiglia in un interno	Conversation Piece	1975 Nastro d'Argento for Best Director
1976	L'innocente	The Innocent	

==== Other films ====
- Giorni di gloria, documentary, 1945
- Appunti su un fatto di cronaca, short film, 1951
- Siamo donne (We, the Women), 1953, episode Anna Magnani
- Boccaccio '70, 1962, based on the episode Il lavoro in Boccaccio's Decameron
- Le streghe (The Witches), 1967, episode La strega bruciata viva
- Alla ricerca di Tadzio, TV movie, 1970

=== Opera ===
Year	Title and Composer	Opera House	Principal cast / Conductor
1954	La vestale, Gaspare Spontini	La Scala	Maria Callas, Franco Corelli, Ebe Stignani, Nicola Zaccaria; Conducted by Antonino Votto
1955	La sonnambula, Vincenzo Bellini,	La Scala	Maria Callas, Cesare Valletti, Giuseppe Modesti; Conducted by Leonard Bernstein
1955	La traviata, Giuseppe Verdi	La Scala	Maria Callas, Giuseppe Di Stefano, Ettore Bastianini; Conducted by Carlo Maria Giulini
1957	Anna Bolena, Gaetano Donizetti	La Scala	Maria Callas, Giulietta Simionato, Nicola Rossi-Lemeni; Conducted by Gianandrea Gavazzeni
1957	Iphigénie en Tauride, Christoph Willibald Gluck	La Scala	Maria Callas, Franceso Albanese, Anselmo Colzani, Fiorenza Cossotto; Conducted by Nino Sanzogno
1958	Don Carlo, Verdi	Royal Opera House, London	Jon Vickers, Tito Gobbi, Boris Christoff, Gré Brouwenstijn; Conducted by Carlo Maria Giulini
1958	Macbeth, Verdi	Spoleto Festival	William Chapman & Dino Dondi; Ferruccio Mazzoli & Ugo Trama;Shakeh Vartenissian. Conducted by Thomas Schippers
1959	Il duca d'Alba, Donizetti	Spoleto Festival	Luigi Quilico, Wladimiro Ganzarolli, Franco Ventriglia, Renato Cioni, Ivana Tosini. Conductor: Thomas Schippers
1961	Salome, Richard Strauss	Spoleto Festival	George Shirley, Lili Chookasian, Margarei Tynes, Robert Anderson, Paul Arnold. Conductor: Thomas Schippers
1963	Il diavolo in giardino, Franco Mannino (1963)	Teatro Massimo, Palermo	Ugo Benelli, Clara Petrella, Gianna Galli, Antonio Annaloro, Antonio Boyer. Conductor: Enrico Medioli. Libretto: Visconti & Filippo Sanjust
1963	La traviata, Verdi	Spoleto Festival	Franca Fabbri, Franco Bonisolli, Mario Basiola; Conducted by Robert La Marchina
1964	Le nozze di Figaro, Wolfgang Amadeus Mozart	Teatro dell'Opera di Roma	Rolando Panerai, Uva Ligabue, Ugo Trama, Martella Adani, Stefania Malagù. Conductor: Carlo Maria Giulini
1964	Il trovatore	Bolshoi Opera, Moscow (September)	Pietro Cappuccilli, Gabriella Tucci, Giulietta Simionato, Carlo Bergonzi; Conducted by Gianandrea Gavazzeni
1964	Il trovatore, Verdi	Royal Opera House, London (November) (Sanjust production)	Peter Glossop, Gwyneth Jones & Leontyne Price, Giulietta Simionato, Bruno Prevedi; Conducted by Carlo Maria Giulini
1965	Don Carlo, Verdi	Teatro dell'Opera di Roma	Cesare Siepi, Gianfranco Cecchele, Kostas Paskalis, Martti Talvela, Suzanne Sarroca, Mirella Boyer. Conducted by Carlo Maria Giulini.
1966	Falstaff, Verdi	Vienna Staatsoper	Dietrich Fischer-Dieskau, Rolando Panerai, Murray Dickie, Erich Kunz, Ilva Ligabue, Regina Resnik. Conducted by Leonard Bernstein
1966	Der Rosenkavalier, Strauss	Royal Opera House, London	Sena Jurinac, Josephine Veasey, Michael Langdon. Conductor: Georg Solti
1967	La traviata, Verdi	Royal Opera House, London	Mirella Freni, Renato Cioni, Piero Cappuccilli. Conducted by Carlo Maria Giulini
1969	Simon Boccanegra, Verdi	Vienna Staatsoper	Eberhard Wächter, Nicolai Ghiaurov, Gundula Janowitz, Carlo Cossutta; Conducted by Josef Krips
1973	Manon Lescaut, Giacomo Puccini	Spoleto Festival	Nancy Shade, Harry Theyard, Angelo Romero, Carlo Del Bosco. Conductor: Thomas Schippers.
