= Visconti di Modrone =

Italian noble family

- Parent family: Visconti of Milan
- Founded: 1683; 343 years ago
- Founder: Niccolò Visconti
- Titles: Duke of Modrone; Duke of Grazzano Visconti; Marquess of Vimodrone; Count of Lonate Pozzolo

The House of Visconti di Modrone is a collateral branch of the Visconti of Milan. It originated in the 17th century and still exists today.

Since the 19th century, several lineage members achieved prominence in different domains of public life, including the theatre and cinema. The House included the film director Luchino Visconti.

== Origins ==
The Visconti di Modrone descend from Uberto, younger brother of Matteo Visconti, Lord of Milan, between 1287 and 1322. Since the primary residence of the first generations of Uberto's offspring was in the castle of Somma Lombardo, they were known by the surname of Visconti di Somma.

In 1473, the two brothers Francesco and Guido Visconti di Somma divided the castle and the other family properties. In 1683, Niccolò Visconti di Somma, a descendant of Guido, married Teresa Modroni, originating the Visconti di Modrone lineage.

The origins of the Visconti di Modrone are recognizable in their current peerages. The title of Count of Lonate Pozzolo traces back to the properties and noble rights in Lonate Pozzolo, a few kilometres south of Somma Lombardo, received by Guido Visconti di Somma in the division with his brother Francesco.

== History ==
In 1778, Francesco Antonio Visconti di Modrone, grandson of Niccolò Visconti di Somma, obtained the title of Marquess of Vimodrone. In 1813, the title of Duke Visconti di Modrone was granted by Napoleon to Carlo Visconti di Modrone (1770–1836).

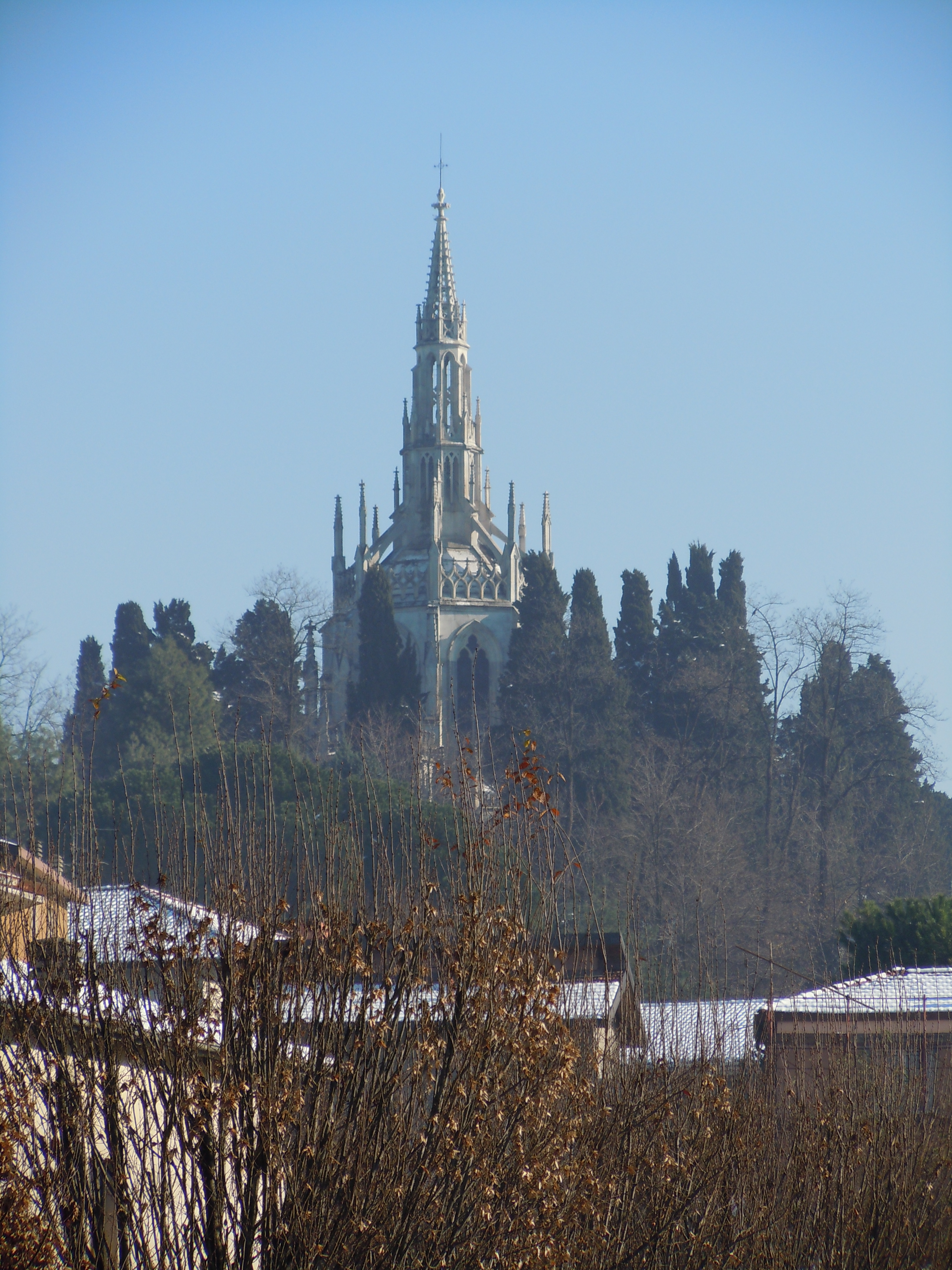
The Visconti di Modrone family mausoleum, seen from Veduggio

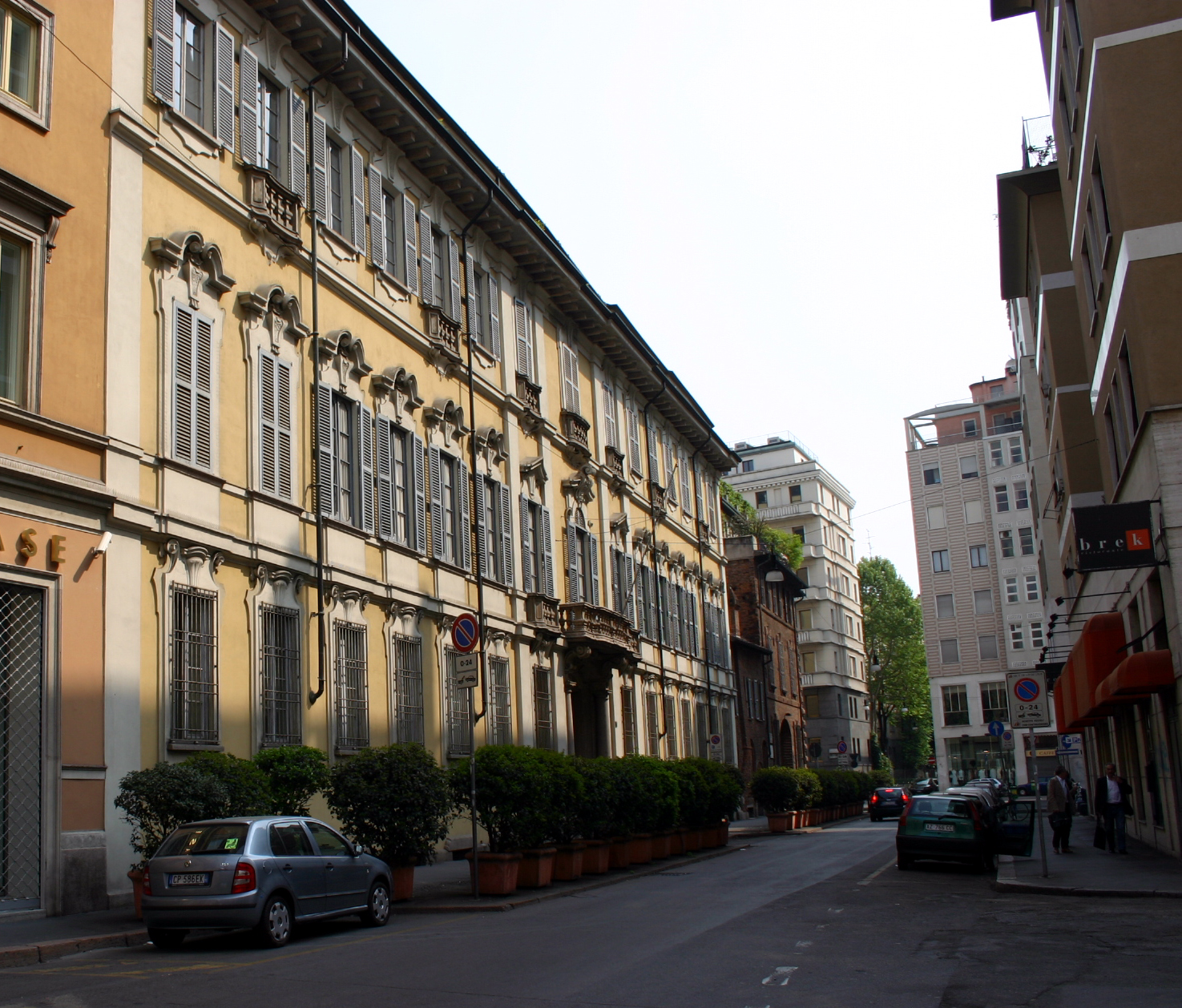
Palazzo Visconti di Modrone in Milan

Between 1884 and 1890, a family mausoleum was erected at Cassago Brianza. Its appearance, inspired by the dome and the spires of the Milan Cathedral, has become part of the local landscape. During the 19th and 20th centuries, industrial undertakings were started by different family members around Milan: silk production in Canegrate, a weaving plant in San Vittore Olona, a bleaching factory in Somma Lombardo, and a cotton mill in Vaprio d'Adda.

At the beginning of the 20th century, Giuseppe Visconti di Modrone (1879–1941), the father of the filmmaker Luchino, renovated a group of hovels and old stables surrounding a medieval family castle located 12 kilometres (7.5 mi) from Piacenza in the municipality of Vigolzone and transformed them into a village of Middle Age aspect which in the early 20th century was named Grazzano Visconti. In 1937, the title of Duke of Grazzano Visconti was granted to Giuseppe Visconti by King Victor Emmanuel III of Italy. Grazzano Castle, built in 1395 by Giovanni Anguissola, a brother-in-law of Gian Galeazzo Visconti, passed to the Visconti di Modrone family following the death of marchese Filippo Anguissola in 1870. It is still owned by the family.

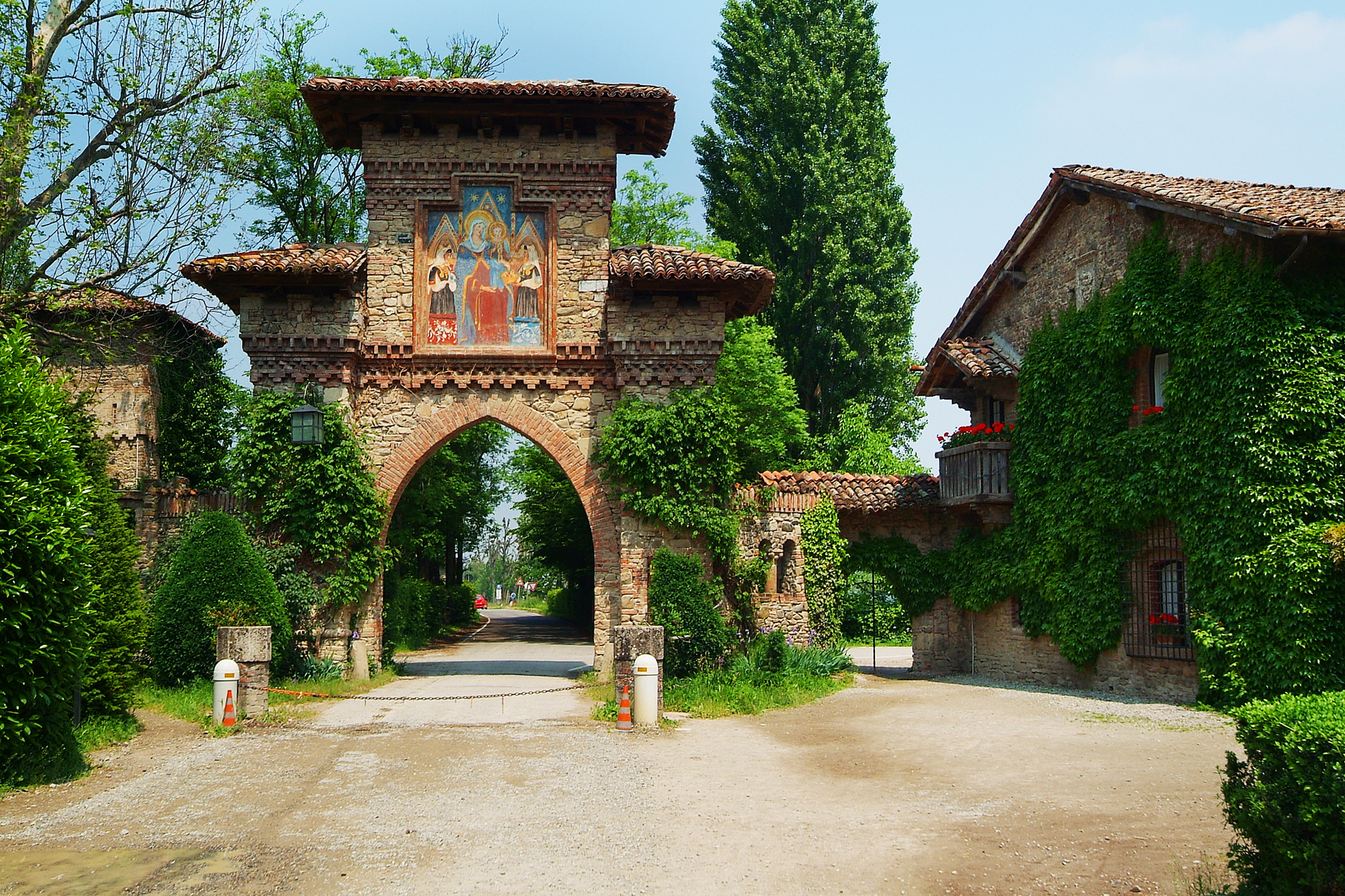
The entrance to Grazzano Visconti

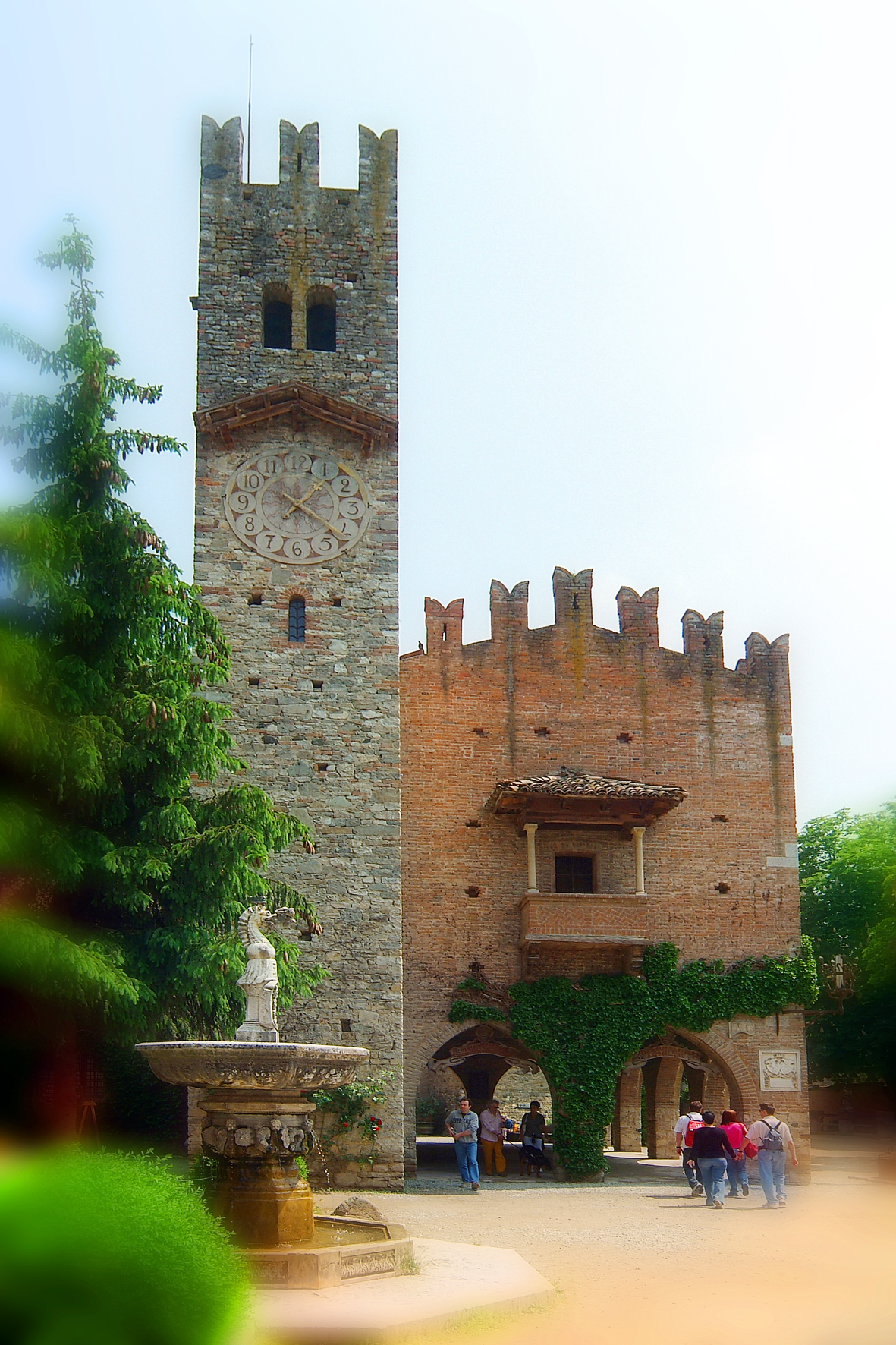
Grazzano Visconti Castle

== Notable members ==
Some members of this branch were:

- Uberto Visconti di Modrone (1871–1923), entrepreneur
- Marcello Visconti di Modrone (1898–1964), son of Uberto
- Guido Visconti di Modrone (military) (1901–1942)
- Luchino Visconti di Modrone (1906–1976), theatre, opera and film director
- Eriprando Visconti di Modrone (1932–1995), director
- Violante Visconti di Modrone, set decorator, nominated at the 90th Academy Awards for her work on Call Me by Your Name (2017)
