= Visconti Castle (Somma Lombardo) =

- Castello Visconteo di Somma
- Somma Lombardo
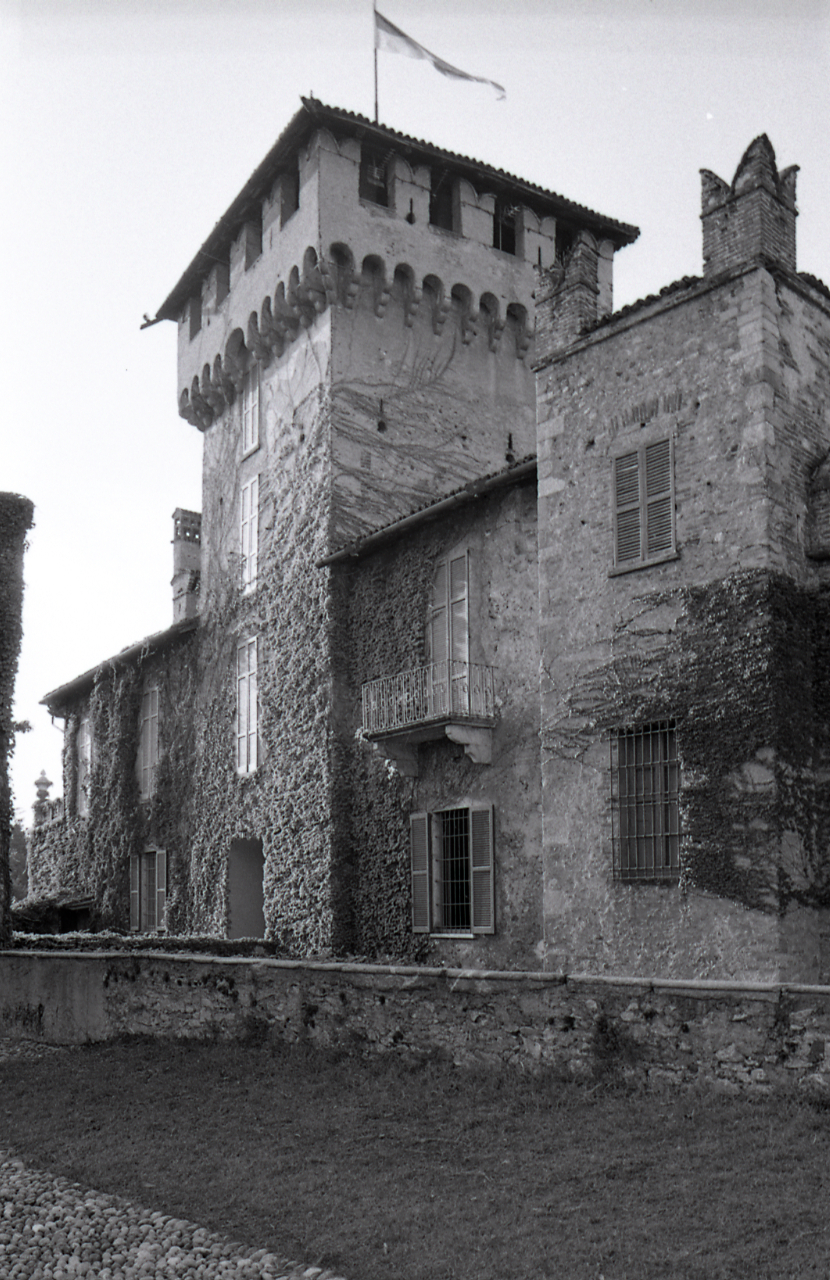
- A detail of the front of the castle in a photo by Paolo Monti

Site information
- Type: Medieval castle
- Condition: Preserved

Location
- Coordinates: 45°41′11″N 8°42′16″E

Site history
- Built: From 13th century

The Visconti Castle of Somma Lombardo is a medieval castle-palace in Somma Lombardo, Province of Varese, Lombardy, northern Italy.

== History ==
Buildings at the site date from the 9th century; a fortress, from the 13th century. In 1448, the brothers Francesco and Guido Visconti, took refuge in this town and castle from the forces of the Ambrosian Republic. They divided the landholdings and portions of the castle. The fortress has been amalgamated from adjacent residences, all once surrounded by a single moat. From the brother Francesco, who owned the newer portion of the castle, descend the Visconti di San Vito; while from Guido, who owned the lower and older portions of the castle, descend the Visconti di Modrone.

The San Vito castle contains frescoes attributed to the school of Camillo Procaccini and an altarpiece by Cerano. The castle also has an extensive collection of barber plates.

Parts of the castle are used for private events and open for guided tours.

== Sources ==
- Beltrami, Luca (1907). Ville e castelli d'Italia: Lombardia e laghi (in Italian) (2 ed.). Tecnografica.
- Del Tredici, Federico; Rossetti, Edoardo (2012). Percorsi castellani: da Milano a Bellinzona: guida ai castelli del ducato (in Italian). Castelli del ducato. ISBN 9788896451021.
- Grisoni, Michela M.; Bertacchi, Cristina (2014). "Three castles in one: Castello Visconti di San Vito, Somma Lombardo (Varese)". In Villoresi, Valerio (ed.). Lombard villas and stately homes. Turin: AdArte. pp. 56–71. ISBN 9788889082546.
