= Palazzo Visconti di Grazzano =

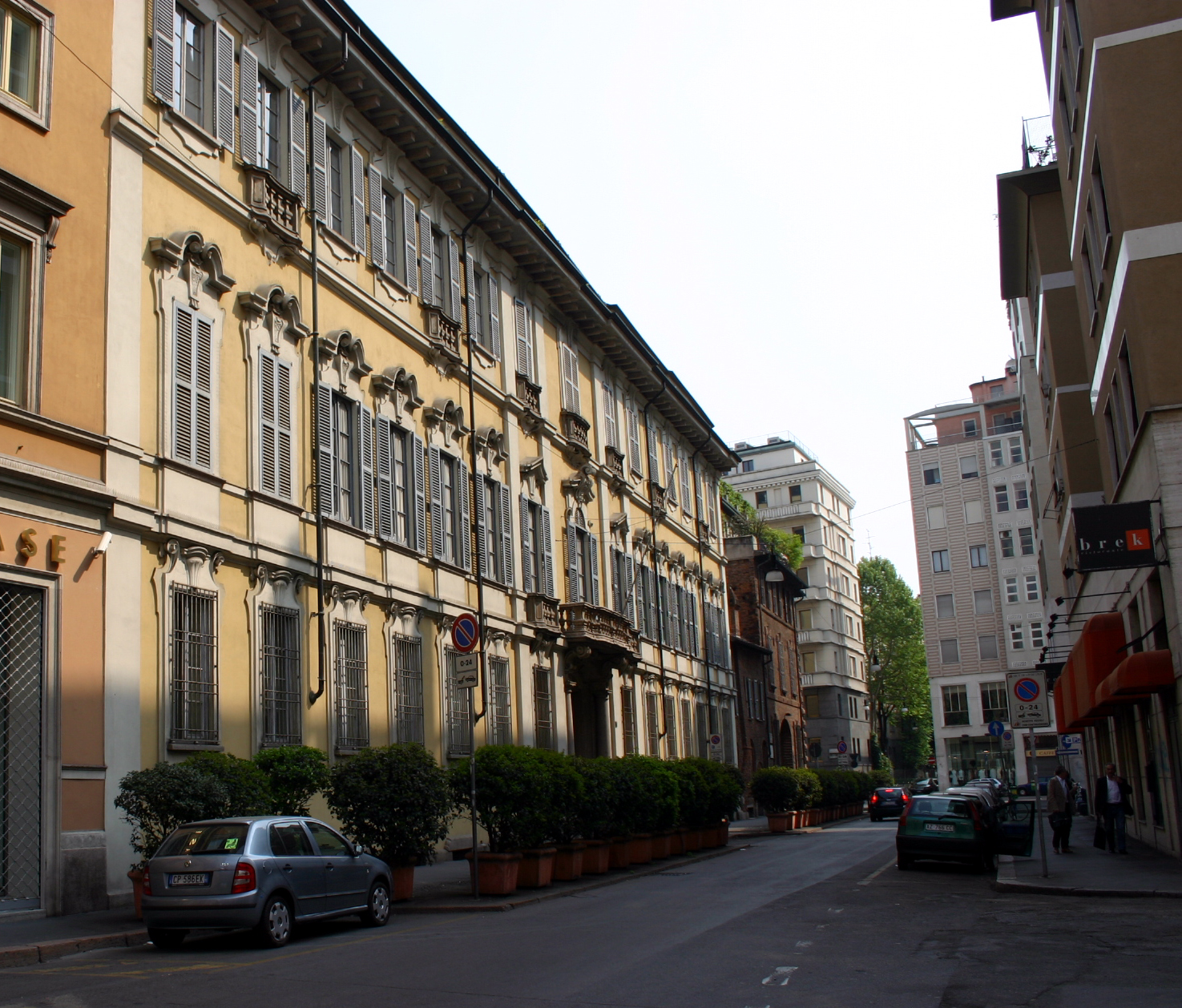
- Facade of Palazzo Visconti di Modrone in Milan
- Interactive map of the Palazzo Visconti di Grazzano area
- Alternative names: Palazzo Visconti di Modrone, Palazzo Bolagnos

General information
- Status: In use
- Type: Palace
- Architectural style: Baroque, Rococo
- Location: Milan, Italy, 8, via Cino del Duca
- Coordinates: 45.466377°N 9.199753°E
- Construction started: 18th century

Design and construction
- Architect: Giuseppe Meda

Palazzo Visconti di Grazzano, also known as Palazzo Visconti di Modrone or Palazzo Bolagnos, is a historical palace located in the centre of Milan, in Via Cino del Duca no. 8.

== History ==
The palace is the result of a series of remodelling and extension works carried out on the initiative of Giuseppe Bolagnos and performed on a nucleus of pre-existing buildings, the most important of which was the house received as a dowry from his consort Isabella Boselli. Although there are no traces of the architect who built it, in the 18th century the palace was already famous in Milanese circles for its much richer and more exuberant style than the usual Milanese dwellings, which tended to decorate the interiors more lavishly than the exteriors.

When Giuseppe Bolagnos died, he was succeeded by his second-born son Carlo. However, the latter died without heirs, determining, according to the testamentary dispositions left by Giuseppe Bolagnos, the passage of the palace to the Ospedale Maggiore di Milano, which in 1759 sold it by auction to the marquis Giuseppe Viani, who enlarged and embellished the palace, acquiring and incorporating the neighbouring buildings, a transformation that lasted until at least 1770.

In 1833, the property was purchased by Carlo Finelli for the sum of 360,000 Milanese lira, to then be sold to the patrician family of the Dukes Visconti di Modrone, a collateral branch of the Visconti family (founder and Sovereign family of the Duchy of Milan) would be a descendant a few years later, for the much higher sum of 750. 000 Milanese lira., who embellished the house with the Visconti stemmi that still decorate the house today.

During World War II, the building suffered heavy damage due to bombing: in the subsequent restoration, some areas of the complex were not spared from the building speculation that was widespread in Milan after World War I. Decorative interventions and frescoes were carried out, such as the Spring composition on the piano nobile, by the painter Filiberto Sbardella. In 1958 the palazzo was bought by the real estate company Lonate s.p.a.. The rooms located on the piano nobile and owned by Socrea s.r.l. are made available for public events.

== Architecture ==
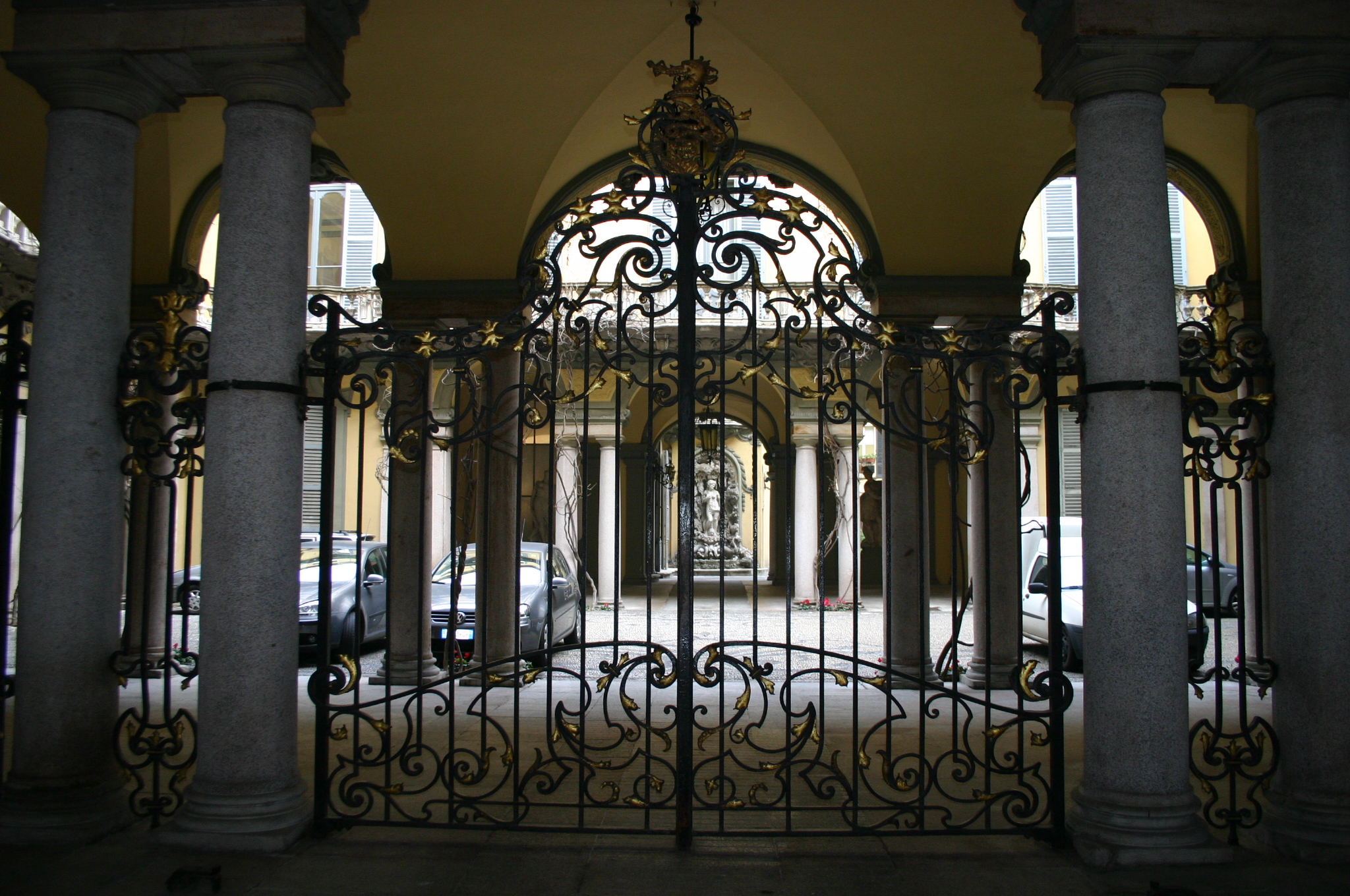
Palazzo entrance

The palace is one of the richest and most elaborate examples of Milanese rococo. The palazzo is built on three floors, the main door is surmounted by the large irregular balcony on the piano nobile: the windows are surmounted by various types of timpani mixtilinear gables. Entering through the main door, one arrives at the courtyard of the palace, surrounded by porticoes supported by coupled columns, which immediately gives onto a second courtyard, of which one immediately notices a small artificial grotto.

The interiors of the piano nobile are the result of two centuries of work: particularly noteworthy are the ballroom with 18th-century frescoes by Nicola Bertuzzi.

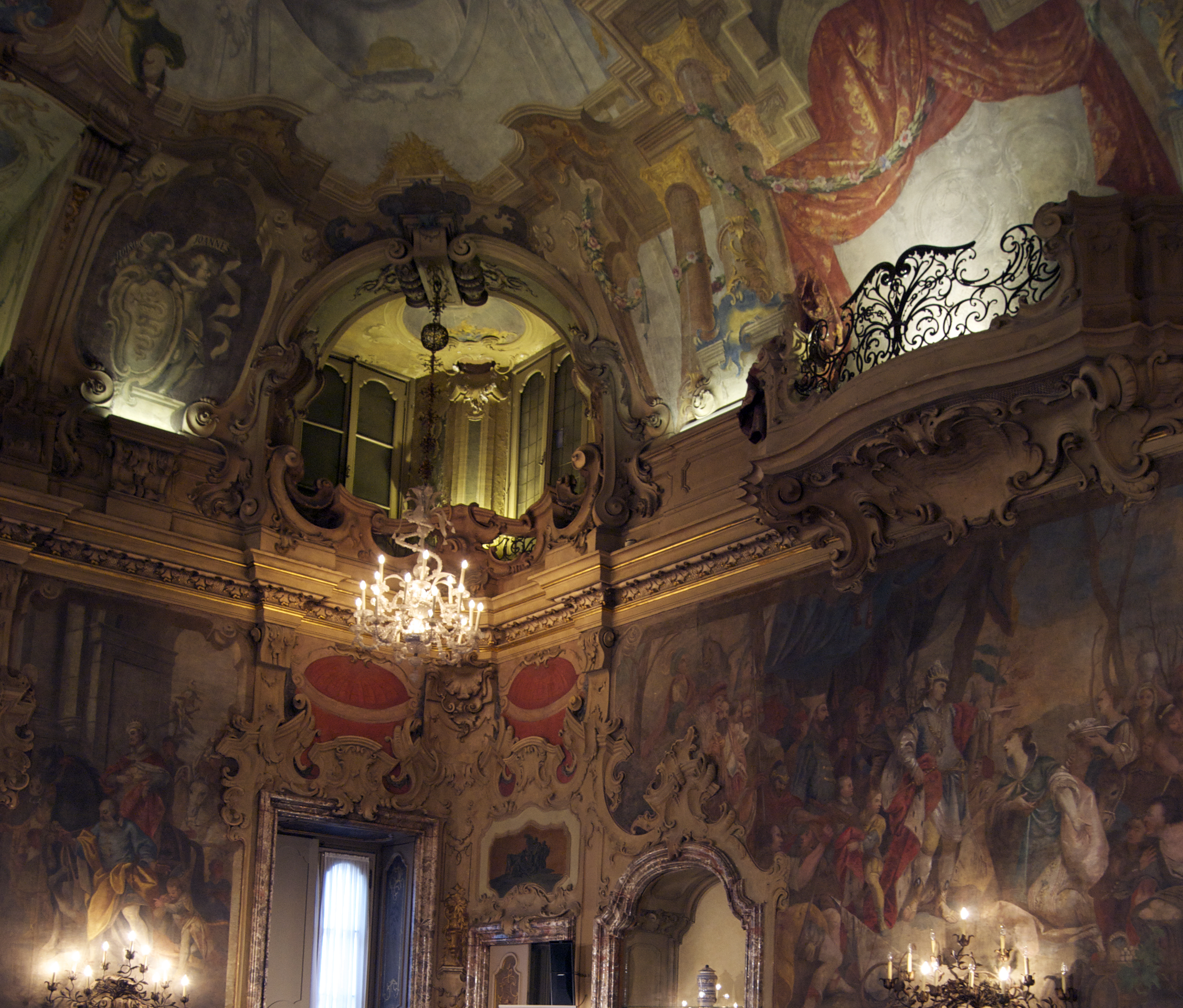
Frescoes main floor

== Sources ==
=== Italian sources ===
- Mascione, Maria, Palazzo Bolagnos, Viani, Visconti di Modrone a Milano (testo on line molto ricco di notizie storiche e immagini)
- Bascapè, Giacomo C., I palazzi della vecchia Milano, Milano, Hoepli 1945
- De Carlo, Valentino, Le strade di Milano, Milano, Newton & Compton 1998
- Lanza, Attilia - Somarè, Marilea, Milano e i suoi palazzi, Milano, LIbreria Milanese 2001
- Latuada, Serviliano Descrizione di Milano – tomo primo, Milano 1737
- Mezzanotte, Paolo, Itinerari sentimentali per le contrade di Milano, 4 voll., Milano, E. Milli 1955-58 (Edizione fuori commercio per la Banca Popolare di Milano)
- Pedrocco, Filippo, Canaletto, Firenze, Giunti 1995, Dossier n.102, pp. 19–20
- Pellegrino, Bruno, Così era Milano - Porta Orientale, Milano, Libreria Milanese, 1991
- Porta, Carlo, Poesie edite ed inedite, Milano, Hoepli 1946
