= Lorenzo de Paolis =

Italian cellist, composer, and conductor

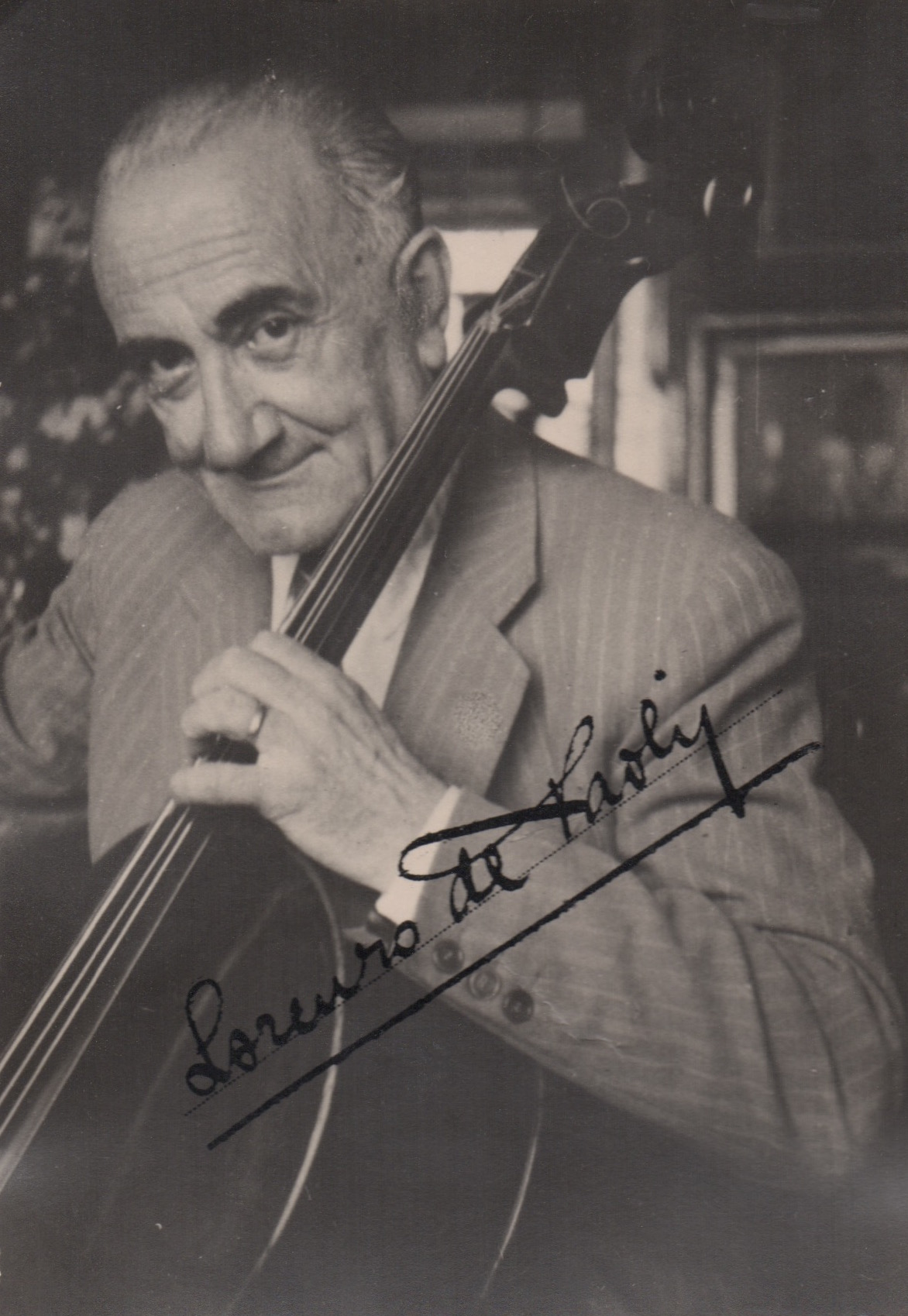
Lorenzo de Paolis

Lorenzo de Paolis (4 September 1890 – 29 October 1965) was an Italian cellist, composer, and conductor.

Lorenzo de Paolis was born into a family of artists and musicians. His father Luigi, from Rome, played and manufactured mandolins and guitars and was the owner of the company of construction and sale of musical instruments "Viscardo Maccolini - Musical Instruments in general", based in Via Cesare Correnti 3, in Milan.
