= Coty Award =

American fashion award (1943–1984)

The Coty American Fashion Critics' Awards (awarded 1943–1984) were created in 1942 by the cosmetics and perfume company Coty to promote and celebrate American fashion, and encourage design during the Second World War. In 1985, the Coty Awards were discontinued after the last presentation of the awards in September 1984; the CFDA Awards fulfill a similar role. It was casually referred to as "fashion's Oscars" because it once held great importance within the fashion industry and the award ceremonies were glitzy galas.

== History ==
The Coty (Avery Nabavian Award) Awards were conceived and created by Coty, Inc. Executive Vice President, Jean Despres, founder of The Fragrance Foundation and FiFi Awards, and Grover Whalen (a member of the New York City Mayor's Committee, and president of the 1939 New York World's Fair). The fashion publicist Eleanor Lambert was employed to promote and produce the awards.

The awards were given solely to designers based in America, unlike the Neiman Marcus Fashion Awards. Until its discontinuation in 1985, the Coty Award was considered one of the most prestigious awards in the field of fashion. The awards were designed by Malvina Hoffman. The womenswear awards are popularly known as Winnies; the menswear award which began in 1968 has no name. Repeat awards were the Return Award and the Hall of Fame award. Special Awards were also awarded to designers in specialist fields.

The popularity of this award began to decline in the late 1970s due to perceived commercial interests by the parent company. In 1979, designers Calvin Klein and Halston announced they would no longer accept the Winnie award. The same year, in 1979, Coty released the Coty Awards make up kit in order to profit off of the awards ceremony, which was perceived by the fashion designers to have cheapened the event. The newly founded Council of Fashion Designers of America (CFDA) appeared more democratic in ideology and began to compete with the Coty Award by 1980 with the CFDA Awards.

In June 1985, Donald Flannery, the senior vice-president of Pfizer, Inc., Coty's parent company, announced that since the awards had successfully brought America into the worldwide fashion scene, it was decided to discontinue them.

== Recipients of the award ==
=== 1943–1949 ===
Year	Winnie	Special Award(s)	Additional citations
1943	Norman Norell	Lilly Daché (millinery), John Frederics (millinery)	Hattie Carnegie (fashion designer & retailer), Clare Potter (American sportswear), Charles Cooper, Mainbocher (American couture), Claire McCardell (American sportswear), Valentina (American couture).
1944	Claire McCardell	Phelps Associates (leather accessories), Sally Victor (millinery)	
1945	Gilbert Adrian, Tina Leser, Emily Wilkens		
1946	Omar Kiam (of Ben Reig), Vincent Monte-Sano, Clare Potter	Ceil Chapman (party dresses), Helen Morgan (raincoats), Carolyn Schnurer (bathing suits), Wallace Mackey (play shoes), Morris Wolock (flat shoes, "shank's mare"), Brooke Cadwallader (scarves), Nina Wolf (jewelry)	
1947	Jacob H. Horwitz (junior fashions), Mark Mooring (couture design for Bergdorf Goodman), Nettie Rosenstein (high end wholesale), Adele Simpson (medium end wholesale)		The awards of 1947 recognised the work of the four main branches of the fashion industry: bespoke high-end design, high end wholesale, mid-priced wholesale, and junior fashion.
1948	Hattie Carnegie	Joseph de Leo (furs), Esther Dorothy (furs), Maximilian (furs)	
1949	Pauline Trigère	David Evins (shoes), Toni Owen (American sportswear)	

=== 1950–1959 ===
Year	Winnie	Special Award(s)	Return Award(s)	Hall of Fame	Additional citations
1950	Charles James, Bonnie Cashin	Mabel & Charles Julianelli (shoes), Nancy Melcher (lingerie)			
1951	Jane Derby	Anne Fogarty (prettiest dresses), Vera Maxwell (American sportswear), Sylvia Pedlar (lingerie)	Norman Norell, Pauline Trigère		
1952	Ben Zuckerman, Ben Sommers (of Capezio)	Karen Stark at Harvey Berin (concept of dressing), Sydney Wragge (concept of dressing)			
1953	Tom Brigance	Helen Lee (children's clothing), John Moore at Matty Talmack (evening wear)			
1954	James Galanos	Charles James (innovative cutting)			
1955	Anne Klein, Jeanne Campbell, Herbert Kasper	Adolfo (millinery)			
1956	Luis Estevez, Sally Victor	Gertrude & Robert Goldworm (knitwear)	James Galanos	Norman Norell	
1957	Leslie Morris, Sydney Wragge	Emeric Partos (furs)			
1958	Arnold Scaasi	Donald Brooks (influence on evening clothes), Jean Schlumberger (jewelry)	Ben Zuckerman	Claire McCardell (posthumous)	
1959				James Galanos, Pauline Trigère	

=== 1960–1969 ===
Year	Winnie	Special Award(s)	Return Award(s)	Hall of Fame	Additional citations
1960	Ferdinando Sarmi, Jacques Tiffeau	Rudi Gernreich (innovative body clothes), Sol Klein at Nettie Rosenstein (costume jewelry), Roxane of Samuel Winston (beaded evening wear)			
1961	Bill Blass, Gustave Tassell	Bonnie Cashin (deep-country clothes), Kenneth (leadership in hair-styling)		Ben Zuckerman	
1962	Donald Brooks	Halston (millinery)			
1963	Rudi Gernreich	Arthur and Theodora Edelman (leather design), Betty Yokova of Neustadter Furs Inc.	Bill Blass		
1964	Geoffrey Beene	David Webb (jewelry design)	Jacques Tiffeau, Sylvia Pedlar (Return Special Award)		
1965	Tzaims Luksus (fabric design), Pablo of Elizabeth Arden (leadership in make-up), Gertrude Seperack of Warner's (bodystockings and foundation garments)	Anna Potok of Maximilian (furs), Sylvia de Gay (young fashion), Edie Gladstone (young fashion), Stan Herman (young fashion), Victor Joris (young fashion), Gayle Kirkpatrick (young fashion), Deanna Littell (young fashion), Leo Narducci (young fashion), Don Simonelli (young fashion), Bill Smith (young fashion)			
1966	Dominic at Matty Talmack	Kenneth Jay Lane (costume jewelry)	Rudi Gernreich, Geoffrey Beene		
1967	Oscar de la Renta	Herbert & Beth Levine (shoes)	Donald Brooks	Rudi Gernreich	
1968	George Halley, Luba Marks	Giorgio di Sant' Angelo (fantasy accessories and ethnic fashions)	Bonnie Cashin, Oscar de la Renta		
1969	Stan Herman, Victor Joris	Adolfo (millinery), Halston (millinery), Julian Tomchin (fabric designs)	Anne Klein		

=== 1970–1979 ===
Year	Winnie	Menswear Award(s)	Special Award(s)	Return Award(s)	Hall of Fame	Additional citations
1970	Giorgio di Sant' Angelo, Chester Weinberg	Ralph Lauren	Steven Brody and Daniel Stoenescu of Cadoro, Alexis Kirk, Cliff Nicholson, Marty Ruza, Bill Smith (all for costume jewelry); Will & Eileen Richardson of Up Tied (Tie-dyed fabrics)	Herbert Kasper	Bill Blass	
1971	Halston, Betsey Johnson at Alley Cat	Larry Kane of Raffles Wear	John Kloss of Cira (lingerie), Nancy Knox (men's shoes), Levi Strauss & Co (worldwide fashion influence), Elsa Peretti (jewelry)		Anne Klein	Hall of Fame citation was Bill Blass.
1972	John Anthony	Robert Margolis of A. Smile Inc. (excitement in menswear), Alan Rosanes of Gordon Gregory Ltd. (excitement in menswear), Alexander Shields (excitement in menswear), Pinky Wolman & Dianne Beaudry of Flo Toronto (excitement in menswear)	Dorothy Weatherford of Mountain Artisans (patchwork and quality)	Halston	Bonnie Cashin	
1973	Stephen Burrows, Calvin Klein	Piero Dimitri	Clovis Ruffin (original young fashion), Joe Famolare (shoes), Don Kline (hats), Judith Leiber (handbags), Herbert & Beth Levine (shoes), Michael Moraux of Dubaux (jewelry), Celia Sebiri (jewelry)		Oscar de la Renta	
1974	Ralph Lauren	Bill Kaiserman of Rafael,	Stephen Burrows (lingerie), Stan Herman (lingerie), John Kloss (lingerie), Fernando Sánchez (lingerie), Bill Tice (lingerie), Sal Cesarani (menswear), John Weitz (menswear), Aido Cipullo (male jewelry)	Calvin Klein, Piero Dimitri (for menswear return award)	Geoffrey Beene, Halston	
1975	Carol Horn	Chuck Howard & Peter Wrigley at Anne Klein Studio	Bill Blass for Revillon America (fur design), Fernando Sanchez for Revillon America (fur design), Calvin Klein for Alixandre (fur design), Viola Sylbert for Alixandre (fur design), Monika Tilley for Elon (swimwear), Nancy Knox (leather menswear)	Bill Kaiserman of Rafael (for menswear return award)	Calvin Klein, Piero Dimitri (for menswear)	Hall of Fame citation was Geoffrey Beene.
1976	Mary McFadden	Sal Cesarani	American Sporting Gear (Sportswear (activewear)), Barbara Dulien (womenswear), Vicky Davis (men's neckwear), Lowell Judson (men's loungewear), Ronald Kolodzie (men's loungewear), Robert Schafter (men's loungewear)	John Anthony, Ralph Lauren	Herbert Kasper, Bill Kaiserman (for menswear)	
1977	Stephen Burrows, Donna Karan & Louis Dell'Olio for Anne Klein	Alexander Julian	Ted Muehling (jewelry), Fernando Sanchez (lingerie)		Ralph Lauren	Hall of Fame citation was Geoffrey Beene(contribution to American Fashion)
1978	Bill Atkinson, Charles Suppon	Robert Stock	Joan & David Helpern (shoes and boots), AMF Head Sportswear Co. (outstanding contribution to activewear), Danskin Inc. (exercise and sports clothing)	Mary McFadden		Menswear Hall of Fame citation was Bill Kaiserman
1979	Perry Ellis	Lee Wright	Barry Kieselstein-Cord (jewelry), Gil Truedsson (shoes), Joan Vass (knitwear), Conrad Bell (men's furs)	Alexander Julian (for menswear return award)	Mary McFadden	Hall of Fame citation was Geoffrey Beene, Halston, Calvin Klein, Ralph Lauren (for contributions to international status of American fashion).

=== 1980–1984 ===
Year	Winnie	Menswear Award(s)	Special Award(s)	Return Award(s)	Hall of Fame	Additional citations
1980	Michaele Vollbracht	Jhane Barnes	Jeffrey Aronoff (handwoven fabrics), Stewart Richer for Reminiscence (retailers), Ron Chereskin (menswear)			
1981	Calvin Klein, Perry Ellis, Geoffrey Beene	Jhane Barnes, Alexander Julian, Ralph Lauren	Barry Kieselstein-Cord (jewelry), Alex Mate & Lee Brooks (jewelry), Fernando Sánchez, Fabrice Simon (beaded evening wear), Hot Sox (hosiery), Robert Lee Morris (jewelry), Laura Pearson at Tijuca (knitwear), Andrew Fezza (menswear special award), Nancy Knox (menswear special award), Robert Lighton (menswear special award)			After Beene, Klein and Lauren all rejected their awards, it was decided that all nominees would receive awards.
1982	Adri	Jeffrey Banks	Susan Bennis & Warren Edwards (shoes), Jay Lord Hatters, Patricia Underwood (millinery), Ted Muehling (jewelry), Allen Veness (weaving and knitwear), Robert Comstock (men's outerwear), Zoran (men's separates)	Norma Kamali, Donna Karan & Louis Dell'Olio (of Anne Klein), Sal Cesarani (for menswear return award)		Geoffrey Beene (fifth Coty Award citation)
1983	Willi Smith	Alan Flusser	Perry Ellis (womenswear), Bill Blass, Alexander Julian, Carlos Falchi (handbags), Susan Horton, Selma, Jon & Barbara Weiser of Charivari	Perry Ellis (for menswear return award)	Norma Kamali	
1984	Adrienne Vittadini	Andrew Fezza	Milena Canonero (tailored clothing), Robin Kahn (jewelry), Barry Kieselstein-Cord (jewelry), Michelle & Janis Savitt (jewelry)	Jhane Barnes (for menswear return award)	Donna Karan & Louis Dell'Olio (of Anne Klein), Perry Ellis (for menswear)	

== See also ==
- List of fashion awards
