= Up Tied =

American textile house specialising in tie-dyed fabrics

Up Tied was an American textile house specialising in tie-dyed fabrics founded in 1968 by the husband and wife team Will and Eileen Richardson and Eileen's brother, Tom Pendergast. They won a special Coty Award for "major creativity in fabrics" in 1970.

== Company history ==
Will Richardson and his wife, who had worked as window-dressers, were given fabric samples by the Rit company, which Will declared he could do better. When challenged by Rit to prove it, Will and Eileen taught themselves in four days to tie-dye, producing a range of fabrics which met with the company's approval. The Richardsons subsequently showed their tie-dyed velvets and chiffons to fashion editors and designers, although with little success until Halston, who admired the technique's "limp, sensuous quality", placed a $5,000 order. When made up by Halston, Up Tied textiles were worn by the likes of Ali MacGraw, Naomi Sims, and Liza Minnelli.

The Richardsons, after less than a year in business, were being called the "best tie-dyers in the city", namely, New York City where they had a studio near Chinatown, Manhattan, on the floor above the Chinese American Democratic Union. In 1970, they were awarded a Special Coty Award alongside a number of other designers, such as Giorgio di Sant' Angelo, Alexis Kirk and Clifton Nicholson; whose work combined ethnic themes and influences with fine craftsmanship and an appreciation of folk art techniques. Up Tied's use of what was described as an "ancient Oriental art" of dying textiles fitted in with this theme. For the Coty fashion show, Up Tied's section was modelled by six dancers choreographed by Murray Louis.

Along with Halston, the fashion designers Donald Brooks and Gayle Kirkpatrick also used Up Tied fabrics. In 1971, the Richardsons gave a how-to lesson to Look where they demonstrated techniques for creating tie-dye fish and origami patterns upon alongside men's vests to create swimsuit tanks for women, alongside images of military surplus garments which they had customised by dying. According to Eileen, tie-dye fashions represented a "youthful trend away from rigidity and conformity".
