= Adrienne Steckling-Coen =

American fashion designer

Adri, photographed by Barbra Walz in 1978

Adrienne Steckling-Coen (1934-2006), known as Adri, was an American fashion designer whose label, Adri, was particularly successful in the 1970s-1980s.

Born Mary Adrienne Steckling on November 7, 1934, in St. Joseph, Missouri, Adri studied at the St. Louis School of Fine Arts. After winning the opportunity to be a guest editor for Mademoiselle's College Issue in 1955, she decided to move to the Parsons School of Design from where she graduated in 1958.

Whilst at Parsons, Steckling met Claire McCardell, who would heavily inspire her early design work. She worked as a fashion assistant for Oleg Cassini, Anne Fogarty (who taught her to celebrate femininity), and also for Sydney Wragge of B.H. Wragge (who taught her tailoring and the value of separates-dressing) before launching her own business, Adri Designs Inc., in 1966. Other labels she launched include Collectors Items and Clothes Circuit. Like her mentor, McCardell, Adri dedicated herself to designing for the modern, "unequivocally contemporary" woman. While her work was subsequently described as sportswear (an industry term describing easy-styled relaxed dressing, rather than literally sporting clothing), Adri told Women's Wear Daily just before her 1966 debut that her work was not sportswear, but clothes for women with active lifestyles. She was known for her trousers and culotte skirt designs, and focused on classic mix-and-match separates so that her customers could collect various garments over the years to assemble into personalized ensembles.

In 1971 the Smithsonian Institution held an exhibition titled "Innovative Contemporary Fashion: Adri and McCardell." In 1982 she was awarded the Coty Award for womenswear design. Soon after winning the Coty, she launched a menswear line. From the mid-1980s into the 1990s, she provided designs to Vogue Patterns to enable home dressmakers to create Adri garments themselves.

In 1976, Adri opened Adri Studio Limited on Seventh Avenue to make designer sportswear. It was still in business in 2006, operating out of Adri's loft to cater to private clients and individual orders, rather than wholesale manufacture.

Adri died at home on 5 November 2006 of Parkinson's disease, two days short of her 72nd birthday. Former colleagues, such as her assistant Nadia Abdella, and the company's former chief executive officer, Jeanne Atkinson, recalled her as both iconoclastic and a "real purist" as well as consistently elegant, and she remained working to the end.

She married Fabio Coen in 1982, and had two sons who survived her. Her archives are held by the Parsons New School of Design.
