= Joan Vass =

American fashion designer

Joan Vass in the 1980s

Joan Vass (1925-2011) was an American knitwear designer and founder of the company bearing her name.

== Early life and career ==
Joan Isabel Kaplan was born in New York City on 19 May 1925. She studied philosophy and history of art at Vassar and the University of Wisconsin, writing her thesis on Søren Kierkegaard. While at Wisconsin, she met and married her husband, the Abstract Expressionist painter and sculptor Gene Vass (1922-1996).

The couple moved to Buffalo after World War II, where Gene had his studies supported by the G.I. Bill and the pregnant Joan sat as an artist's model for students. In 1959, the Vasses lived in Rome, Italy, as Gene had been awarded the Prix de Rome, before returning to New York in 1960 and becoming part of the first group of creatives and intellectuals to originate the loft apartment community in SoHo, Manhattan. Their home at 159 Mercer Street was accessible only by the building's original industrial freight elevator.

Vass worked for the publishing companies Walker & Company and Harry N. Abrams as an editor of art books, wrote for Art in America, and was a fund-raiser and assistant curator for the Museum of Modern Art before launching her fashion business in the mid-1970s. Around the same time as she started her business, Joan and Gene separated. They were divorced in the late 1980s and Gene died in 1996.

== Fashion ==
Joan Vass did not train in fashion design, and was inspired to take up knitting after the actress Cynthia Harris recommended it to her. She employed local women to make her original designs up for her in the cottage industry manner. Vass explained that her intention was to enable older women to support themselves through their own skills, and that her workers chose their own times, some working full-time and others fitting in the work as and when they could, such as while on the bus to their other employment. Her first merchandise was knitted hats and scarves, followed by sweaters, and a couple years later in 1977, she launched her own label. Following an introduction to Geraldine Stutz, the president of Henri Bendel, Vass's knitwear became more widely known and was seen on magazine covers modeled by the likes of Farrah Fawcett and Candice Bergen. She was awarded a Coty Award in 1979 for "contribution to the international status of American fashion". Other awards Vass received were the Prince Machiavelli Prix de Cachet award in 1980 and the Smithsonian Institution's Extraordinary Women in Fashion award in 1978.

As she became more successful, Vass signed up with a South Carolina wholesale manufacturer Signal Apparel, which allowed her to sell her clothes in 400 stores across America, making multi-million pound sales. In addition to unique sweaters marketed as "O.O.K." (one of a kind), some of her most successful designs were a top based upon Marlon Brando's singlet in A Streetcar Named Desire and a James Bond inspired watch cap called the 007. She insisted on producing garments in classic styles and repeated designs, and regularly reissued designs rather than offering them solely for one season. Her work used natural fibers such as wool and cotton, and was known for being unstructured, quirky, and being constructed with selvages.

Although her business was widely successful and her designs were popular with clients including Jacqueline Kennedy Onassis, Ali MacGraw, and Brooke Hayward, Voss maintained it as much as possible as a family affair. She worked from home, one of the first designers to do so, with an unlisted phone number, before opening business in West 25th Street and eventually moving to 105 East 29th Street. Her three children were all involved in the business, with her son Jason trying to negotiate licensing deals and other agreements, her daughter Sara handling public relations, and her adopted son Richard Mauro having responsibility for Joan Vass U.S.A.. Vass had a reputation for being outspoken and contrary, such as wearing black clothing when most people were wearing Emilio Pucci's vibrant psychedelic prints. She was an active member of the Council of Fashion Designers of America, describing herself as an "old crone" due to her confrontational presence at meetings, although she had the respect and agreement of fellow members such as former CFDA President Stan Herman.

Vass retired in 2006, the same year that Global Sourcing and Design began its purchase of the Joan Vass company. In Spring 2007 Global launched the sublines Joan Vass Signature and Joan Vass Studio, and Vass's high end label closed. The acquisition of Joan Vass by Global was completed in 2010.

== Later life and death ==
Vass died in her sleep at home on 6 January 2011 following a fall several weeks earlier. She was survived by her three children.
