= John Moore (fashion designer) =

American fashion designer (1928–1996)

John E. Moore (February 21, 1928 – August 28, 1996) was an American fashion designer, active during the 1950s and 1960s.

== Early life and education ==
John E. Moore was born in 1928 in Wilson, Oklahoma, and raised in Alice, Texas, where his parents managed a lumber yard and appliance store. He studied under Norman Norell, and graduated from the Parsons School of Design in New York in 1950.

== Career ==
Moore worked as a designer for Elizabeth Arden, Jane Derby, and Mattie Talmack before founding his own label in 1963. His clientele included Angela Lansbury, Lisa Kirk, and Marilyn Monroe. Notably, he designed the dress Monroe wore at her wedding to Arthur Miller and another dress that malfunctioned during a public appearance. He also designed Lady Bird Johnson's inaugural gown in 1965.

In the late 1970s, Moore converted his store into an antiques shop, which he operated until his death.

Moore received the Coty American Fashion Critics Award in 1953. His designs are included in the collections of the Smithsonian Institution and the Metropolitan Museum of Art, among other museums.
