= Tijuca (disambiguation) =

Tijuca is a neighborhood in Rio de Janeiro.

Tijuca may also refer to:

- Barra da Tijuca, a neighborhood in Rio de Janeiro
- Tijuca (bird)
- Tijuca forest, Rio de Janeiro
- Tijuca Massif (pt:Maciço da Tijuca), rocky area in Rio de Janeiro
- Tijuca National Park, Rio de Janeiro
- Tijuca, a cargo steamship built in 1886
- Tijuca, a passenger steamship built in 1899
- Tijuca, a 1970s–90s knitwear label run by Laura Pearson
