= Herbert Kasper =

American fashion designer (1926–2020)

- Born: December 12, 1926; New York City, U.S.
- Died: March 1, 2020 (aged 93)
- Occupation: Fashion designer

Herbert Kasper (December 12, 1926 – March 1, 2020) was an American fashion designer known as Kasper. He studied English and advertising at New York University and fashion at the Parsons School of Design in New York from 1951–53 and l'Ecole de la Chambre Syndicale de la Couture Parisienne in 1953. He left NYU to serve in the US Army in Europe. After World War II he enrolled at Parsons, where he became a protégé of milliner Fred Frederics. After graduating, he returned to Paris for two years developing his skills in design while working for Jacques Fath, Christian Dior, and Marcel Rochas. When he returned to the US, he worked for Frederics at Mr. John.

Kasper's talent was for making inexpensive clothes look "exquisite" and expensive, which endeared him to several other Seventh Avenue manufactures in the 1950s. He then worked as a dress designer for Penart, Lord & Taylor in New York. His works were known as Kasper of Penart. In the 1960s he started to make clothing under his own label. In 1963, he won the Coty Award for American designers.

Joan Leslie (1902–1966) had a women's dress and sportwear company that Mr. Kasper worked for, when she died, Mr. Kasper became the head designer for the company and eventually became Vice-President for the company, the Lesley Fay Co. Inc. He left the company in 1985. He designed clothes for Joanne Carson, the wife of talk show host Johnny Carson, who described his clothes as being both feminine and sexy.

Mr. Kasper married Betsey Pickering in 1955, divorced 1958. He married Jondar Conning in 1979.

In 2011 (January 21 - May 1) his collection of Drawings and Photographs were shown at the Morgan Library in the exhibition Mannerism and Modernism: The Kasper collection of Drawings and Photographs. “Kasper was in some ways always the youngest person in the room. He had an unerring eye, a warm and droll sense of humor, and an insatiable curiosity.” Morgan Library & Museum Director Colin B. Bailey wrote of the collector.

== Quotes ==
Over a lifetime of designing I've evolved a philosophy that comes from creating clothes for a particular kind of American woman. (Who, by the way, I very much admire.) This woman is adventurous and vital with a lifestyle that demands she play many different roles throughout the day. It's the confident spirit of this kind of woman that inspires me most.

Whatever she's doing, running a home, a career, entertaining, mothering, traveling, I deeply believe this woman remains an individual. No one is going to tell her exactly what she has to wear, no matter what's currently in style. She wants and needs high style, high quality, fashion-conscious clothes that can last for more than one season…. And because I think I have an exceptional ability to anticipate trends, my clothes always have a "today" spirit. I'm constantly refining, improving, interpreting…trying to capture the essence of the times without being trendy. But from whatever source my ideas come from, I always keep in mind that lively, energetic, smart looking woman who is my customer. She's my motivation and my ultimate inspiration.—Herbert Kasper

== Awards ==
- Coty American Fashion Critics Award
- Cotton Fashion Award - 1972
- Maas Brothers Pavilion Design Award - 1983
- Cystic Fibrosis Foundation, Governor Award - 1984
- Ronald MacDonald House Award - 1984
