= Cesarani =

Cesarani is a surname. Notable people with the surname include:

- David Cesarani (1956–2015), British historian who specialised in Jewish history
- Salvatore J. Cesarani (born 1939), American fashion designer
