= Monika Tilley =

American fashion designer

- Born: Monika Theresia Nowotny; July 25, 1934; Vienna, Austria
- Died: December 23, 2020 (aged 86); Manhattan, New York, US
- Education: Academy of Fine Arts Vienna
- Occupation: Fashion designer

Monika Tilley (July 25, 1934 – December 23, 2020) was an Austrian-born American designer noted for designing loungewear and activewear. Many of her designs were featured on models in publications including the Sports Illustrated Swimsuit Issues. She focused on functional design and some of her designs were considered racy and provocative for their times. She was a founding member of the Council of Fashion Designers of America and two time recipient of the Coty American Fashion Critics' Award in the swimwear category.

== Early life ==
Tilley was born Monika Theresia Nowotny in Vienna, Austria, to Margarete (née Kinateder) and Franz Nowotny. Her father worked with the government in the department of agriculture, while her mother was a school teacher teaching English and physical education. She completed her master's degree from the Academy of Fine Arts Vienna despite her father's reservations against art being a viable career. She went to the United States on a grant from UNICEF and decided to stay back in New York and work in the fashion industry. Her parents were not pleased with her decision to stay back and are noted to have repeatedly called the consulate to have her return including asking them to "extradite her".

== Career ==
As a 29-year-old ski-wear designer for White Stag she was bullish on trends from the 1964 Winter Olympics and picked up the functional design focusing on clean lines, along with the caps with pom-poms, parkas, stretch pants, and boots, as a trend for activewear. She went on to create a line of designs for athlete Caitlyn Jenner during her time as a track athlete in the 1970s. She also designed the parade and honors uniforms for the United States' 1980 and 1984 Winter Olympics teams.

She designed swimwear for Sports Illustrated Swimsuit Issues and was noted to have designed more swimwear for the cover edition of the magazine than any other independent designer. Her creations were adorned by models including Christie Brinkley and Cheryl Tiegs when they modelled for Sports Illustrated Swimsuit Issues in the 1970s and 80s. In a style that has been described as 'racy' she designed swimwear that was considered provocative at that time. Many of her creations, including a famous nipple-baring white mesh swimsuit worn by Tiegs in the 1978 cover edition of the magazine, drew equal amounts of praise as well as objections from moralists and feminists.

She worked for brands like White Stag, Anne Klein, and Anne Cole before going on to start her own company Monika Tilley Inc. with clients including Levi Strauss & Co.

Some of her creations including the famous Sports Illustrated Swimsuit Issue cover nipple-baring white mesh swimsuit are a part of the collection at the Metropolitan Museum of Art. She was a recipient of two Coty American Fashion Critics' Awards in the swimwear category. She was a founding member of the Council of Fashion Designers of America and remained an emeritus member of the board.

== Personal life ==
Tilley (then Nowotny) married her husband, Merten Arthur Tilley in 1957, with the wedding taking place at the Hofburg Palace in Vienna. She had met Tilley when she was studying in Vienna. The couple would return and settle in Forest Hills, Queens.

Tilley died on December 23, 2020, in Manhattan, New York. She had been hospitalized earlier after suffering from multiple strokes. She was 86.
