= Jhane Barnes =

American fashion designer

- Born: 1954 (age 71–72); Phoenix, Maryland, U.S.
- Education: Fashion Institute of Technology
- Occupations: Fashion designer, product designer

Jhane Barnes is an American designer of clothing, textiles, eyeglasses, carpets and furniture, and the owner of the Jhane Barnes fashion design company. Barnes is known for incorporating complex, mathematical patterns into her clothing designs. She uses computer software to design textile patterns, which then translates the patterns into jacquard loom instructions, which are sent to mills to be woven into fabric.

== Design career ==
Barnes studied at the Fashion Institute of Technology. She launched her fashion company in 1976 with a $5,000 loan from her Fashion Institute of Technology Biology professor. The company's first design was a pair of pants which had no back pockets. This design became popular with celebrities and helped to launch her career.

In 1978, she bought her first loom, and quickly became known for her innovative textiles. A big part of what makes her work notable is her work with several mathematicians, including Bernt Wahl, Bill Jones and Dana Cartwright in creating some of her designs. She has been featured in Wired. She received the 1980 and 1981 Coty Menswear Award. She designed the tenth anniversary Orlando Magic uniforms. Her designs are sold at many upscale stores, including Saks Fifth Avenue and Nordstrom. Celebrities who have worn Barnes's clothing include Cher, Bette Midler, Elton John, Robin Williams, Daryl Hall and John Oates, and Richard Dreyfuss.

In addition to her success in the world of fashion, Barnes has been a prolific product, textile, carpet and furniture designer. Her awards include 4 Good Design Awards from the Chicago Athenaeum Museum of Architecture for her textile, furniture and carpet designs; a three-time winner for the Jhane Barnes Textile collection: “Best of NEOCON” in 1998, 1999 and 2000. Her work includes partnerships with Bernhardt Design, Lumicor, Kenmark Optical and Tandus Flooring.

== Awards and nominations ==
- 1980: Coty American Fashion Critics' Award -Coty Award:
- 1981: First ever Menswear Designer of the Year - CFDA
- 1981: Cutty Sark, Outstanding Designer of the Year, Menswear
- 1982: Cutty Sark, Outstanding Designer of the Year, Menswear
- 1983: IBD Award, Gold for first Knoll textile collection
- 1984: Coty American Fashion Critics' Award -Coty Award
- 1986: ASID American Society of Interior Designers Award for Knoll textile collection
- 1990: Woolmark Award for Menswear
- 1995: Best of Neocon Silver Award for Seating: Sofas & Chairs, Bernhardt (Tatami Lounge Collection)
- 2004: Calibre Lifetime Achievement Award

== See also ==
- List of fashion designers
