= Madeline Weeks =

American fashion editor

- Occupation: Fashion editor
- Employer: Conde Nast Publications
- Title: Fashion Director, GQ Magazine

Madeline Weeks is a fashion director, stylist and costume designer, once recognized for her editorial and design expertise.

Weeks studied Fashion Design at Parsons School of Design and The Fashion Institute of Technology. She lives and works in New York and Los Angeles.

Weeks began her career as a fashion designer, working for Ralph Lauren in design and advertising, a position that included styling advertising campaigns. She went on to work with the designer Zoran, where she managed the company and oversaw design, retail, as well as production and publicity. Later, Weeks created costumes for independent films, designed official pilot and crew uniforms for Michael Eisner's corporate jet, and helped relaunch Coach in 1997.

She also created print and broadcast advertising campaigns for brands including Netflix, Adidas, Rolex, Mercedes-Benz, Clinique, Tommy Hilfiger and Levi's.

Weeks continues to design and style looks for the Jonas Brothers world tour, photo shoots for Vogue, Vanity Fair and GQ, among others. She has created her own design & consulting business to collaborate with talent in multiple artistic disciplines. She designed the costumes for David Byrne's world tour in 2008, styled music videos, including Mark Ronson's production of the Amy Winehouse hit "Valerie",” The Foo Fighters, "Shame Shame", and styled major television and print advertising campaigns and personal image-making for celebrities like Jerry Seinfeld, Paul Simon and Hannah Gadsby.

In 2020, Weeks created a collection of faux fur coats, called First By Madeline, made in Los Angeles.
