= Sally Victor =

American milliner

- Sally Victor at work
- Born: Sally Josephs; February 23, 1905; Scranton, Pennsylvania, USA
- Died: May 14, 1977 (aged 72); Manhattan, New York, USA
- Occupation: Milliner
- Spouse: Sergiu F. Victor (m. 1927)
- Children: 1

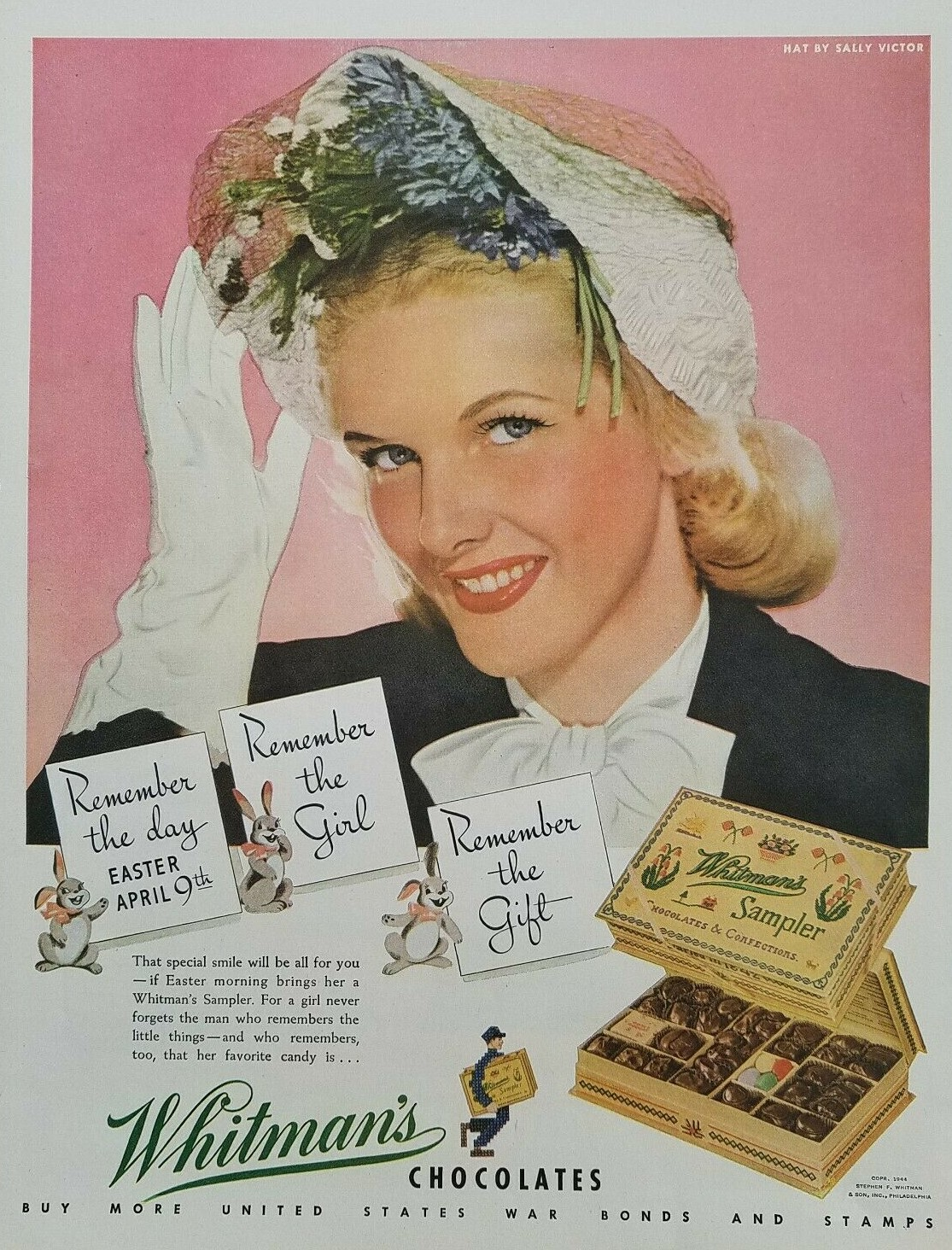
Advertisement for Whitman's Chocolates and a Sally Victor hat, Easter 1944

Sally Victor (née Josephs; February 23, 1905 – May 14, 1977) was a prominent American milliner from the late 1920s through the 1960s. Her designs were popular with Hollywood actresses such as Irene Dunne, Helen Hayes, and Merle Oberon, as well as First Ladies Mamie Eisenhower and Jacqueline Kennedy, and Queen Elizabeth II.

== Early life ==
Sally Josephs was born in Scranton, Pennsylvania. She took an interest in design at age eight, when her family moved to New York where her aunt had a millinery shop. As she reflected in a 1949 interview,

Like most kids, I liked to copy the grown-ups, so it seemed perfectly natural for me to start fashioning scraps of felt and ribbon into hats for my dolls. When I got a little older, my aunt taught me to help her retrim and shape hats for her customers and on the side, I started dreaming up hats for myself and my friends, too.

== Career ==
At 18 she began working in the millinery department of Macy's. Within a year she had become assistant millinery buyer, and three years later she was hired as chief millinery buyer at Bamberger's department store in Newark. After marrying millinery wholesaler Sergiu F. Victor in 1927, she gave birth to a son, Richard, and briefly retired. However she soon returned to work and became the head designer of Victor's firm, Serge.

In 1934 she established a fashion label under her own name, with a millinery salon on East 53rd Street in New York. Her hats began to be sold in high-profile stores, including Lord & Taylor on Fifth Avenue. Fortune compared her work with that of Lilly Daché and Mr. John.

Victor was regarded as an innovator, and her hats remained popular through her retirement in 1967. Along with Lilly Daché and Mr. John, she is seen as one of the most prominent milliners of the period.

She died at Doctors Hospital in New York on May 14, 1977.

== Style ==
Sally Victor drew inspiration from many diverse sources, including Native American art, Chinese lanterns, Japanese armor, and the works of Henri Matisse, Piet Mondrian, Rogier van der Weyden, and Frank Lloyd Wright. She was innovative in introducing synthetic materials into her hats alongside traditional ones.

Some of her popular product lines included "baby bonnets", "Pompadour hats", "Grecian pillboxes", "honey hives", and "Tudor tops". Designs intended for the mass market were sold through a subsidiary named Sally V.

Victor designed several hats for First Lady Mamie Eisenhower, including one known as the "Airwave" which she wore at her husband Dwight's inauguration in 1953. Former First Lady Eleanor Roosevelt also wore Sally Victor hats in the 1950s. Victor later created designs for Jacqueline Kennedy.

Throughout her career, Sally Victor emphasized making hats which were attractive, rather than being chic or avant-garde.

Good fashion is an individual matter. It is whatever makes you look better. I do not believe in any style that does not make the wearer prettier.

== Awards ==
- 1943 Coty Awards – Special Award for Millinery Fashion Inspiration (a patriotic collaboration of John-Frederics, Lilly Daché and Sally Victor)
- 1944 Coty Awards – Special Award for millinery
- 1956 Coty Awards – Winnie (womenswear) award
