= George Halley =

George Halley may refer to:

- George Halley (footballer) (1887–1941), Scottish footballer
- George Halley (couturier) (born 1930), American fashion designer
