= Kaiserman =

Kaiserman may refer to:

- Bill Kaiserman (1942–2020), American fashion designer
- Franz Kaiserman (1765–1833), Swiss painter; see Bartolomeo Pinelli
- 3880 Kaiserman, a minor planet
