= George Halley (couturier) =

American fashion designer (born 1930)

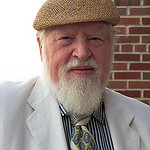
George Halley

George Halley (born December 11, 1930) is an American fashion designer awarded the Coty Award in 1968 shortly after opening his fashion house in New York City.

== Life and career ==
Born George Halley Sickle and raised in Alliance, Ohio, Halley worked on his family's farm until graduating high school. He initially tried for a scholarship at an art school in Cleveland, but the program was full. In 1949, at the age of 18, he hitchhiked to New York City to pursue his interest in fashion. His first job in New York was as an assistant to Baron Max von Waldeck, a designer from Austria. He worked with the Baron on some gowns and was allowed to show his own sketches to certain customers. The actress Rose Marie wrote of the Baron in her autobiography Hold the Roses: “He was adorable, with the accent and all – about forty, bald, and sort of pudgy. I loved him. I ordered three gowns . . . . I must say they were the most beautiful gowns I have ever seen or owned.”

Halley then started working as a porter at Lord & Taylor, but soon moved to draping the store's windows for Christmas. He progressed to working in the backrooms of several Seventh Avenue dress firms. He never received formal training, but did work for Charles James, Jo Copeland for Pattullo, Andrew Arkin, Richard and Sidney Blauner, Jeunesse, Tzaims Luksus, and Jane Derby, as well as the photographer Richard Avedon. While Halley was working for Arkin, Diana Vreeland, the editor-in-chief of Vogue at the time, saw a dress of Halley's that she liked. Afterwards, she often gave him space in her magazine, and once wrote him that seeing his dresses provided “the greatest possible pleasure.” Among the women he designed for were Dionne Warwick, Julie Andrews, Lauren Bacall, Julie Wilson, and Alexis Smith.

His first own collection consisted of "romantic" gowns in silk and satin that evoked the antebellum South. It was considered "too individualistic" by his employer, who fired him. However, it won him the backing of the husbands of two of his most devoted customers and he became a trendsetter. Halley's first show under his own label was in 1966 in the garden at the New York restaurant Lutece, later ranked by the Zagat Survey as the best restaurant in America for six consecutive years. As a thank you, Halley painted a portrait of Andre Surmain, Lutece's owner. Surmain was so pleased that he sent the picture to his mother in Gibraltar and kept a photo of it over Lutece's bar.

Halley's 1968 collection won the Coty award and made him known in fashion circles throughout the U.S. Prominent fashion publicist Eleanor Lambert said that one of his collections “blew a clean wind of change through this taste-minus style period.” Women's Wear Daily called him "a designer in a lovely world of his own.” Halley opened his fashion house on West 56th Street in Manhattan. His label lasted for about ten years.

== Private life ==
Halley was introduced to his future wife, Claudia Morgan, by Yvonne Presser, who was later known as the highest-paid runway model. Morgan told Halley that she had heard he could find good clothes for low prices, and asked him to buy her a cocktail dress on a limited budget. She was amazed when he returned with four. Both Morgan and Presser were models for designer Norman Norell. When Halley and Morgan married in 1958, Norell gave her away, and she wore a wedding dress of antique brocade that Norell had designed.

Halley later started a new line named for his wife. Claudia served as an inspiration and a critic of his work, and had a say in the choice of fabric. He once said: “I never design anything Claudia wouldn’t wear.” They separated in 1978.

Halley lives in the New York City area with his partner Yoshi Shimano. He continues to paint and to design and sew clothing for friends. He made several of the dresses his friend Julie Wilson wore in her cabaret performances, including the one pictured in her New York Times obituary.

== In the 21st Century ==
Halley's work has continued to be recognized decades after the end of his label. A 2013 auction sold nearly 40 vintage Halley dresses. In 2015, he was listed among the 10 designers to add to one's vintage collection: “Feathers, crystals, hand painted fabrics and fine workmanship are all things to expect from a George Halley gown.”

Several of his pieces are listed in the collection of the Costume Institute of the Metropolitan Museum of Art. His work has appeared on websites such as Etsy and Pinterest.

In 2012, he and a friend published a book on the work of Norma Grauman of Brody Embroidery. Halley had been a customer and good friend of Grauman, whose company (operating from the 1930s to the 1980s) specialized in work for high fashion designers, theatrical productions, and the Ringling Brothers Circus.
