= Giorgio di Sant' Angelo =

Argentinian fashion designer

Giorgio di Sant'Angelo
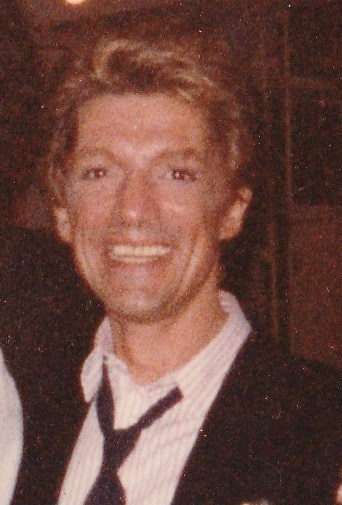
- Born: Jorge Alberto Imperatrice; 5 May 1933; Rosario, Argentina
- Died: 29 August 1989 (aged 56); New York. New York
- Education: Institute of Industrial Design, Barcelona, Spain; Sorbonne University, Paris, France
- Awards: Coty American Fashion Critics award, 1968, 1970; Council of Fashion Designers of America Award, 1988

Giorgio di Sant' Angelo (born Jorge Alberto Imperatrice; May 5, 1933 – August 29, 1989), commonly known as Giorgio Sant'Angelo, was an Italian/Argentinian fashion designer based in the United States. He was known for creating ethnic-inspired looks early in his career, for which he won the prestigious American Coty Fashion Critic's award in 1968 and in 1970. Using fabrics like tie-dyed chiffon, leather and cotton, he created romantic clothing that reflected the hippie culture of the era. But his innovative use of knitwear, which he continuously developed throughout his career, was often his signature and was an influence on other designers.

== Early years ==
Sant'Angelo was born as Jorge Alberto Imperatrice in Rosario, Argentina, to a middle class family. Son of Domingo Antonio Imperatrice and Leila Ratti, he had a younger brother, Hector Daniel Imperatrice (born 10 April 1945). Later in life, he said he was born a nobleman in Florence, Italy, the son of a Florentine count.

He received a degree in architecture at the University of Florence, then studied industrial design and ceramics. He also studied with Picasso for six months, as the result of winning an international ceramics competition, sponsored by the French government. Picasso encouraged his student to "trust his own restless creativity and to keep on trying new artistic ventures," and Sant'Angelo created an animated film cartoon and submitted it to Walt Disney. Impressed by the film's inventiveness, Disney brought him to Hollywood and gave him an apprenticeship. But unable to speak English well, Sant'Angelo was lost in the vastness of Los Angeles and quit after 15 days.

== New York ==
Sant'Angelo moved to New York City after his experience at Disney. He first worked as textile artist, and later worked in interior design. For fun, he started making Lucite and plastic jewelry. Catherine Murray di Montezemolo first noticed the jewelry, then later Diana Vreeland, who started featuring it in Vogue magazine. This set his career into motion. Ms. Vreeland recognized the talent that Sant'Angelo showed, and hired him as a freelance stylist. It was out of this collaboration that some of the most iconic fashion photographs of the 1960s were taken. Shots like the model Verushka wrapped in fur in the desert, or psychedelic flower makeup around one of Twiggy's eyes.

== Seventh Avenue ==
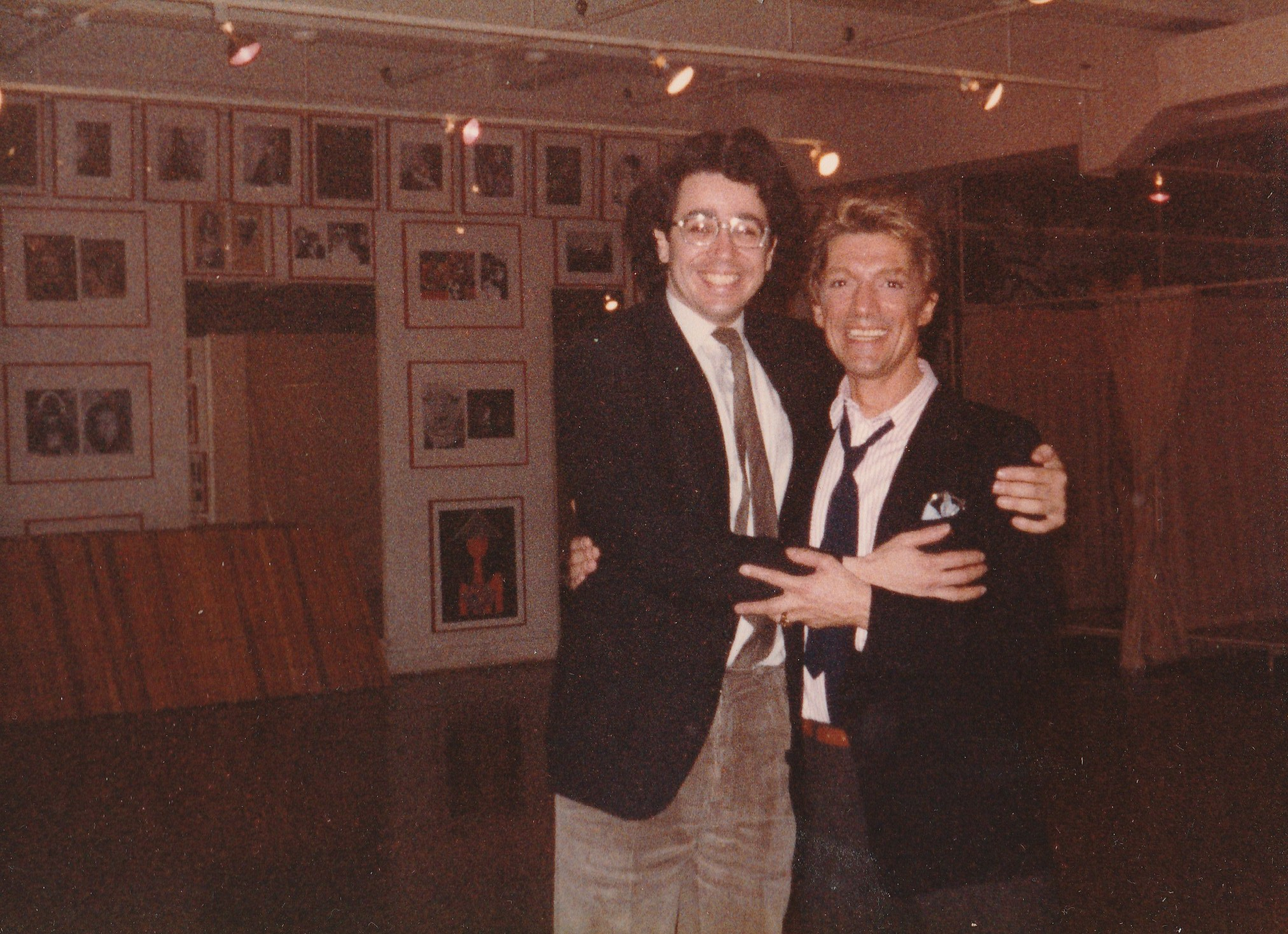
Sant'Angelo with friend, guitarist Michael Laucke who often provided the music for Sant'Angelo's New York fashion shows

Sant'Angelo opened his own ready-to-wear business in 1966. He experimented with knits, and developed new fabrications with textile mills like DuPont. He also collaborated with textile converters like Crantex, to create his own prints, and leather makers like Calderon, for his accessories. He cited various native and ethnic cultures as the inspiration for his collections, like the American Indian or the Bohemian Gypsy. But his most important contribution to modern women's clothing at the time was his liberating construction techniques and his use of stretch fabrics. He rejected the traditional shift with the zipper-up-the-back, and instead, designed clothing that wrapped, tied, hung or clung to the body. He didn't simply design clothes, he ornamented the body and made fantasy wearable. He made couture pieces for celebrities and entertainers as well. Eventually, he started to license his name and expand into cheaper, more affordable clothing. The first line was called Sant'Angelo 4U2, which were less expensive versions of his fantasy pieces. Then there was the 'Marjer Parts' line, which was also more affordable, but more trend-influenced. Later, he dropped the 'di' from his last name and licensed out his name as Giorgio Sant'Angelo. Unfortunately, much of that clothing did not have his own hand involved, and instead, was overly commercial and did not possess his innovative signature. In 1976, Sant'Angelo befriended guitarist Michael Laucke, whom he met through jewelry designer, philanthropist and former fashion model Elsa Peretti, and Sant'Angelo frequently hired Laucke to play at the launching of his new lines in New York, setting "the pace for a more subdued Sant'Angelo".

== Comeback ==
In the mid-1980s, Sant'Angelo added the "di" back to his last name and continued to design his high end signature line. Made almost entirely out of stretch knits, critics hailed it, confirming the return of his influence. The versatile, wrap stretch pieces of clothing, in unique materials, colors and patterns, proved an antidote to the overly tailored styles of the time.

He lived in Manhattan in his later years. He died of lung cancer at St. Luke's-Roosevelt Hospital Center at the age of 56. Designers like John Galliano and Marc Jacobs cited him as an influence and he was given a plaque on the 7th Avenue walk of fame along with his contemporaries such as Halston and Stephen Burrows.
