= Nancy Melcher =

American fashion designer specializing in lingerie

Nancy Melcher Diemand
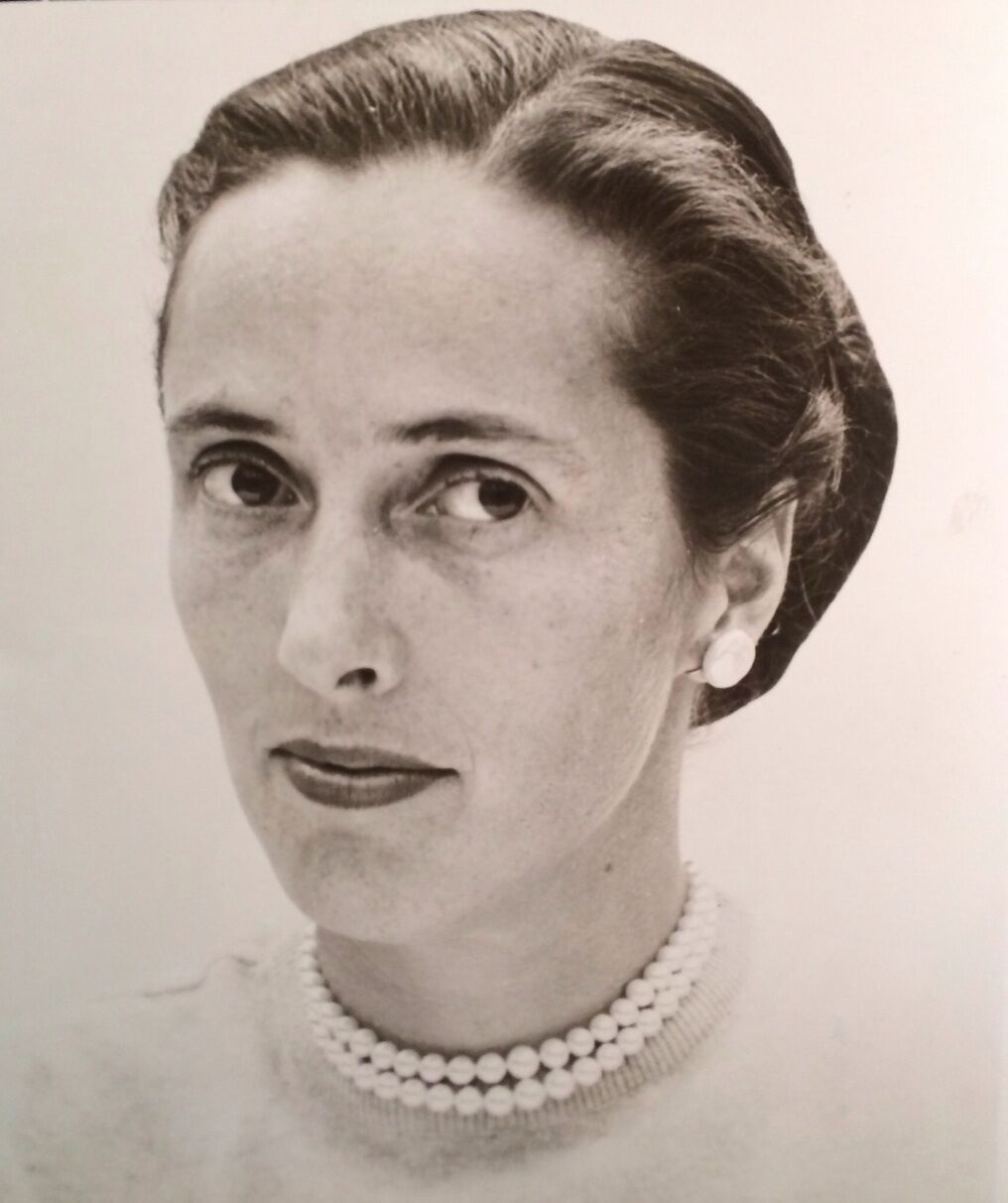
- Nancy Melcher in 1950
- Born: Nancy Melcher; 21 January 1916; Indianapolis
- Died: 28 March 2015 (aged 99); Middlebury, Vermont
- Known for: Lingerie
- Awards: Special Coty Award, 1950

Nancy Melcher Diemand (1916–2015) was a fashion designer specializing in lingerie. In 1950, she became the first underwear designer to win a Coty Award.

== Biography ==
Melcher was the daughter of the publisher Frederic G. Melcher and his wife, children's author Marguerite Fellows Melcher. She was born 21 January 1916 in Indianapolis, Indiana, and grew up in Montclair, New Jersey.

She studied at Williams College, Smith College, and the McDowell School for Costume Design in New York.

In 1942, she married John Anthony "Buzz" Diemand Jr., and the couple lived in Buckingham, Pennsylvania. The marriage lasted until his death in 1992. Aviation was one of Melcher's favorite pastimes, although she also studied watercolor painting and pursued many different handicrafts, from pottery to quilting to carpentry. After her husband's death, Melchard volunteered at the Porter Hospital cafeteria and other local charitable establishments. She died at the age of 99 in the Eastview nursing home, Middlebury, Vermont, on 28 March 2015, and was survived by her son and daughter.

== Fashion designer ==
Melcher joined the firm Vanity Fair in 1937 as a designer. Her work, in conjunction with clever advertising, helped make the firm famous and successful. In 1939, she patented a design for a combined corset and brassiere for Vanity Fair, which was approved in 1941. She was particularly known for her use of nylon, a synthetic fiber invented and produced by DuPont, who stated in 1950 that Vanity Fair was the first firm to commercially produce heat-set, permanently-pleated nylon lingerie.

Melcher won a Special Coty Award in 1950, making her the first underwear designer to be so recognized. The award-givers particularly noted her use of nylon tricot as original and having "brought new excitement and beauty to traditional and highly functional lingerie fashions."
