= Vicky Davis =

American menswear accessories designer

- Born: 1925
- Died: 2006 (aged 80–81)
- Occupation: Menswear accessories designer

Vicky Davis (1925 – September 5, 2006) was an American necktie designer based in New York.

== Early life ==
Born Victoria Wolkin, Davis lived in Michigan with her husband, Larry, and their two sons, and filled her time by acting as a PTA president for her sons' school. When their sons began growing up, Davis became aware that she would have to leave her role with the PTA, and find something to fill her time.

== Fashion design ==
While shopping for holiday clothes for her husband for a cruise break they were planning, Davis realised that available neckties were very dull and uninteresting. As a solution, she bought material and had a fellow PTA member make up 5-inch wide cravats that her husband wore on the holiday, to the admiration of fellow passengers. This inspired Davis to pursue a career in making neckties, by employing PTA members to sew in her basement. Eventually, with the support of Larry, Davis moved to New York from Michigan in her 40s to find workers and manufacturers who could meet the increasing demand for her work. Once there, Davis's business took off, and by 1982, she had become very successful. She was widely sold across the United States, in stores including Macy's and Bloomingdale's.

Her first designs were wide ties, in the kipper style, but in the late 1970s she accommodated the demand for skinny ties and became a champion for the new style. The film Annie Hall, which came out around the same time, helped give Davis's business a boost by inspiring fashion trends that coordinated with what she was selling. She disliked following set rules, stating that she was interested in designing for people, and encouraged customers to choose ties they liked, rather than solely focusing on what matched their clothing, or caring about their tie fitting their jacket-lapel width. Her ideal customer was an independent, creative young person who sought to be independent and individual.

The Vicky Davis logo featured her signature curly hair and large glasses, and Davis was well known in the industry for her strength of character and squeaky-voiced personality. In 2006, Gerald Andersen, the executive director of the MDFA (Men's Dress Furnishings Association), described her as being "comforting" and "like a den-mother to the neckwear industry," while the editor-in-chief of MR magazine, Karen Alberg Grossman credited her with "virtually" creating humorous ties as well as being a warm and generous person and a good friend, able to both rely on the goodwill of her professional friendships and be a supportive and good friend herself. Davis's sense of humor, passion and positively charged enthusiasm for her work made her popular with the fashion press as well as with colleagues and her peers. She was featured on The Phil Donahue Show.

From the beginning, her husband and sons had been actively involved in the business, and in 1978, her son, Rob, joined the company fresh from graduating Parsons. Rob became a designer in his own right for the label, and by 1981, his designs were being featured on magazine covers as much as his mother's work. In the mid-1980s Rob developed a separate label, and a tie from his first "Rob Davis for Vicky Davis" collection was worn by Charlie Sheen in the final scene of the 1987 movie Wall Street. The film was influential on men's fashion, encouraging many people to emulate the looks from the film, including "power ties" with strong color and pattern that were unlike previous traditional banker's ties.

Vicky Davis was awarded a Special Coty Award for neckwear in 1976. She also won a Cutty Sark award for innovative neckwear and accessories.

== Later life and death ==
After retirement, Davis lived in Greenwood Lake, New York. She died on September 5, 2006, at the age of 81 and was buried in Southfield, Michigan. She was survived by her husband and sons, and a sister and brother.
