= Pauline Trigère =

American fashion designer (1908–2002)

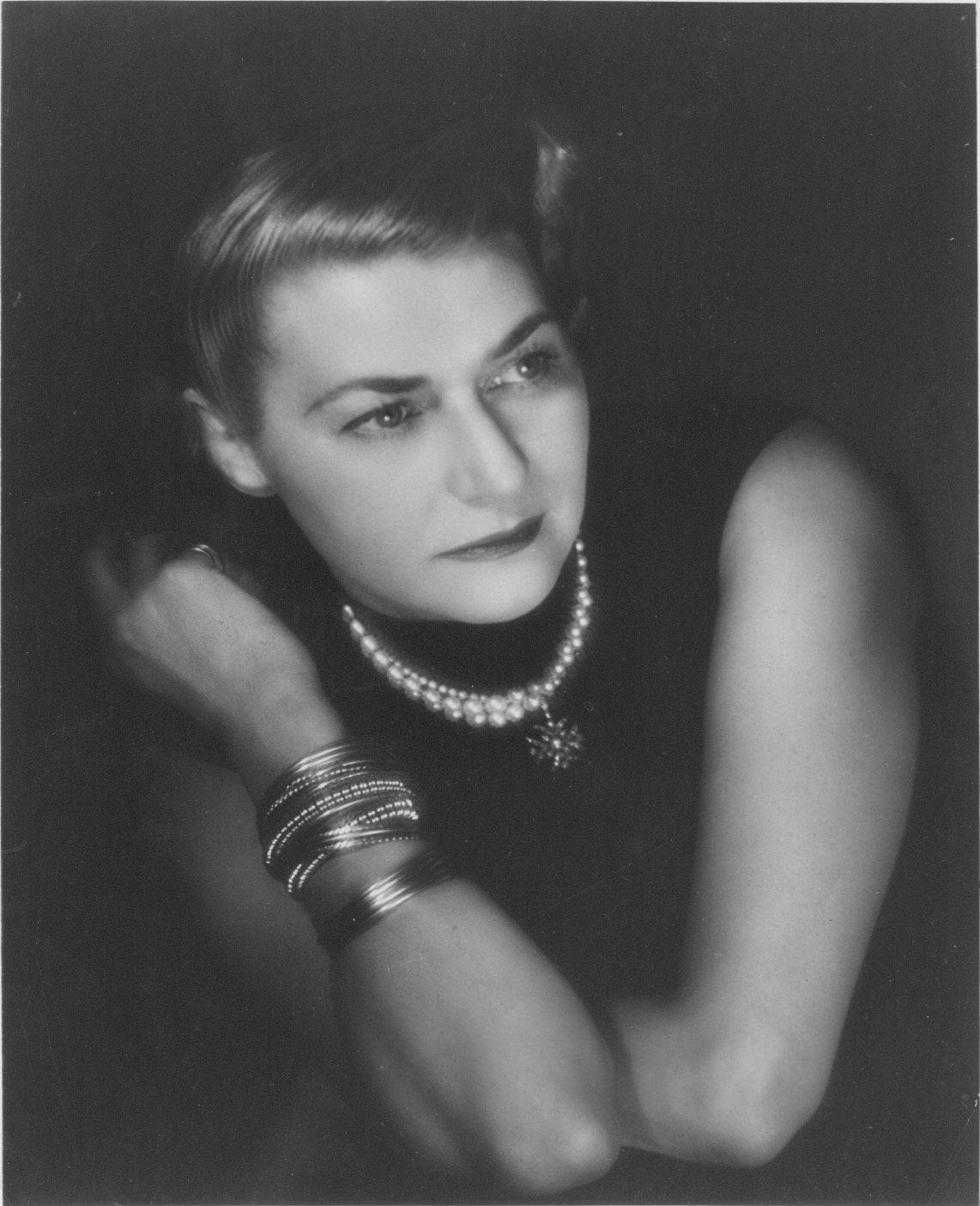
- Trigère in 1952
- Born: November 4, 1908; Paris, France
- Died: February 13, 2002 (aged 93); New York City, U.S.
- Education: Martial et Armand, Paris
- Occupation: Fashion Designer

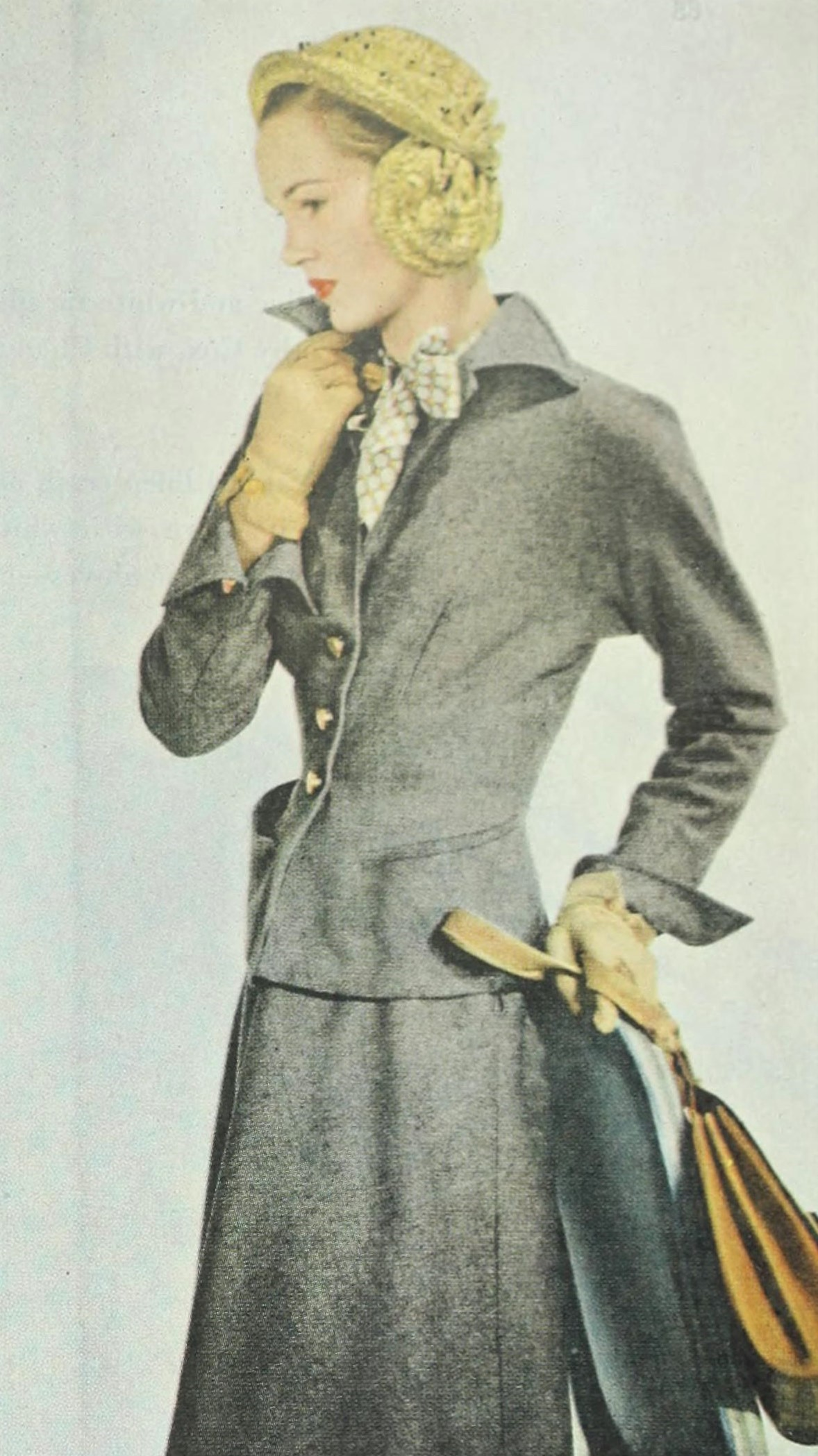
Suit by Pauline Trigère, hat by Hattie Carnegie, 1948

Pauline Trigère (November 4, 1908 – February 13, 2002) was a French and American couturière. She was famous in the United States during the 1950s and 1960s. She designed novelties such as the jumpsuit, the sleeveless coat, the reversible cape and the embroidered sheer bodice. She reinvented ready-to-wear fashion, matching form to function with bold prints and architectural silhouettes to create a distinctly modern female aesthetic. Trigère's loyal clients included Grace Kelly, Jacqueline Kennedy Onassis, Elizabeth Taylor, Kay Wiebrecht, and Evelyn Lauder.

== Early life ==
Trigère was born in Paris to Russian Jewish parents in the 9th Arrondissement, next to "Place Pigalle" Her father Alexandre was a tailor, while her mother Cecile was a dressmaker. Trigère was a proficient seamstress by age ten, often assisting her mother in altering women's clothes, and she designed her first dress in her early teens. At that age, however, Trigère was more interested in medicine than in fashion: she later noted that, despite dreams of becoming a surgeon, Alexandre forbade it ("he didn't want me playing with cadavers"). After graduating from Collège Victor Hugo in Issy-les-Moulineaux at age fifteen, Trigère apprenticed as a trainee cutter at Martial et Armand in the Place Vendôme, Paris. There she honed her expertise in cutting and designing women's clothing, as well as met her husband, Lazar Radley, in 1929.

== Career ==
Uneasy about the looming Nazi threat, the Radleys departed Paris for Argentina, making a pit stop in New York City, in 1936. Trigère did not foresee remaining in the United States, let alone starting her own business, when she arrived in Manhattan on December 24, 1936. In a 1984 interview, she said of this time in her life “I was really a little housewife with two small children and I had a husband who really didn’t want his wife to work." Convinced to remain in the United States by fellow designer Adele Simpson, Trigère found work first with Ben Gershal and later with Travis Banton at Hattie Carnegie. Following the attack on Pearl Harbor in 1941, Trigère departed Carnegie, where she was then earning $65 per week. With the aid of her brother Robert (she and her husband divorced shortly prior), Trigère launched her first collection of eleven dresses in January 1942.

She later described her label as born out of economic necessity rather than desire for fame: "there was no drive because I wanted to become a great designer. I had two small children and a mother and we all had to eat. That's the drive I had." Packing the collection in a suitcase and travelling by Greyhound Bus, Robert showcased the dresses to luxury retailers across the country. A group of American department store executives purchased the dresses and, one year later, Trigère took over Carnegie's lease and opened Trigère Inc.

Trigère won the first of her three Coty Awards in 1949, by which point she had expanded from custom dresses, suits and coats into women's read-to-wear. She also designed scarves, jewelry and men's ties, and developed a perfume line called Trigère. By 1958, annual sales at Trigère, Inc. had reached over $2 million; in the mid-1980s, they exceeded $6 million. Trigère was a featured designer in McCall's New York Designer collection of dress patterns for the home sewing market in the 1960s.

In 1961, Trigère hired model Beverly Valdes as her house model, and became one of the first high-status fashion houses in the United States to hire an African-American model.

In December 1973, Trigère traveled to Mount Mary University to give a demonstration of her cutting and draping techniques, appraise students works, and speak to them about her insights into the fashion industry.

Trigère ceased to take part in fashion weeks and closed her ready-to-wear storefront in 1994, moving out of her Seventh Avenue storefront to a smaller space in the Fashion District. There she established P.T. Concepts, a firm offering her scarves and jewelry. Trigère closed P.T. Concepts in 2000.

== Style ==
Like Chanel and Lanvin, Trigère did not sketch her designs; she cut and draped from bolts of fabric directly on models or mannequins. Although she was considered "a designer of classy, frill-less ready-to-wear," Trigère's work was inventive in many ways. In the 1940s, Trigère was among the first designers to use common fabrics such as cotton and wool in evening wear. Although her palette tended to be subdued, Trigère experimented with prints later in her career, as well as added unique accents to her dresses, capes, and coats, like fur trims and jewels. Her signature turtle appeared in many of her printed fabrics. In the 1960s, she introduced the jumpsuit as a fashion staple and, in 1967, designed the first rhinestone bra. Los Angeles Times writer Bettijane Levine described the glamour of Trigère's clothing: "They seem to lend stature or stage presence even to those who don't look commanding in some other designer's outfits. By virtue of their couture-type structure and tailoring, they make even average-height women look statuesque."

Trigère became the first significant designer to employ an African-American fashion model when in 1961 she hired Beverly Valdes for a permanent position in her store. In response, one major Memphis store threatened to pull their business but when Trigère held firm, the store relented and continued to buy her fashions.

Trigère's fashions were worn by many famous women including Beverly Sills, Evelyn Lauder, Lena Horne, Angela Lansbury, Bette Davis, and Wallis Simpson. Trigère also designed many of Patricia Neal's costumes for Breakfast at Tiffany's, additional dresses were designed by Edith Head.

In 1992, Trigère celebrated her 50th anniversary in fashion with benefit fashion show and dinner for 600 guests at the Fashion Institute of Technology in Manhattan. At the time, Trigère was considered to be the only designer to have stayed in business for 50 years. In 1993, Trigère received the Lifetime Achievement Award from the Council of Fashion Designers of America. In 2001, she was awarded the Order of the Legion of Honor.

Pauline Trigère's papers are held by Brandeis University Archives & Special Collections. More than thirty Trigère dresses and ensembles are housed at the Kent State University Museum Designer Archives, and her sketchbooks can be viewed by appointment at the June F. Mohler Fashion Library, located in Rockwell Hall. You can also find a selection of her garments in the Oklahoma Fashion Museum Collection, this includes a black & gold evening ensemble, a gold evening ensemble, and a full length two-piece red silk formal ensemble.

In 2021, creative director Franklin Benjamin Elman leads design for the Trigère collection.
