= Alexander Julian =

American fashion designer (born 1948)

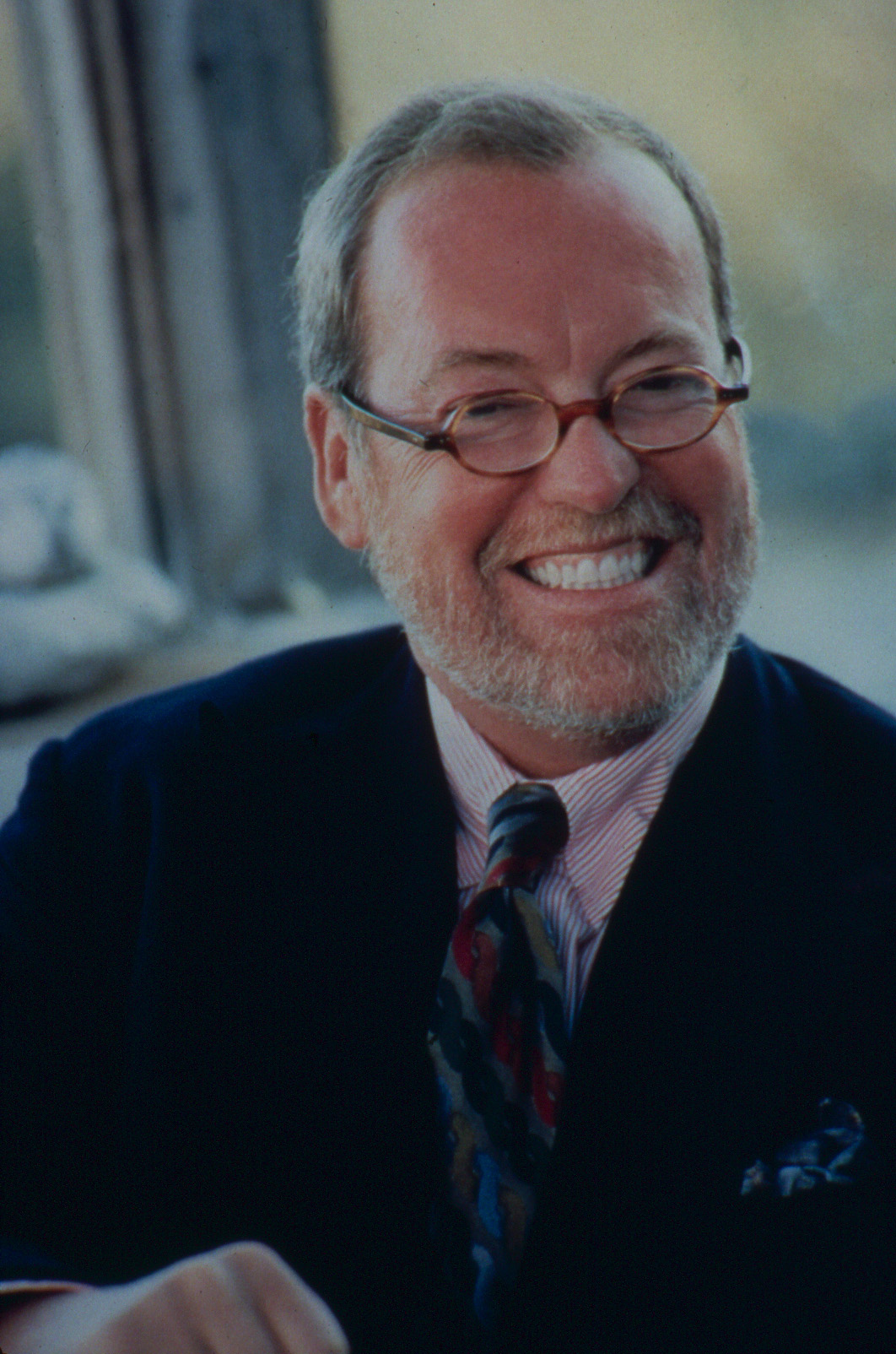
- Born: February 8, 1948 (age 78); Chapel Hill, North Carolina, U.S.
- Education: University of North Carolina at Chapel Hill
- Labels: Colours by Alexander Julian; Alexander Julian Private Reserve; Alexander Julian Home Colours
- Spouse: Meagan Mannell (?—present)
- Children: 7
- Awards: Coty Award

Alexander Julian (born February 8, 1948) is an American fashion designer, known for his "Colours" clothing brand and designing his own clothing fabric. Julian has won five Coty Awards for design and the Cutty Sark award three times.

== Background ==
Born to Mary Brady and Maurice S. Julian, he was raised in Chapel Hill, North Carolina. His father, Maurice S. Julian (1915–1993), opened a cycling shop in Chapel Hill, Julian's Cyclery, later becoming a clothier and opening Julian's in 1942. Julian pursued a degree in English at the University of North Carolina, Chapel Hill while working at his father's clothing store. Julian pleaded with his father to open a store of his own, and while his family was away for a month in the summer of 1969, Julian released one of his father's tenants from a lease, dropping out of school and at age 19 opening his first store, Alexander's Ambition. He subsequently bought out his father's interest, leading to a period where he and his father were in direct competition. In 1973 Julian campaigned for the Chapel Hill Board of Aldermen (town council), finishing fifth.

In 1988, Julian received a Distinguished Alumni award from UNC. The store is now located on the north side of Franklin Street and is called Julian's.

Julian had one child with his first wife. He has three children with his wife, the former Meagan Mannell and one child by a previous marriage. Two other children were placed for adoption.

== Career ==
In 1975 Julian moved to New York, founding the Alexander Julian Company. In the 1990s Julian consolidated his companies under a venture capital fund, which subsequently liquidated its fashion interests in 1995. Having essentially lost his clothing businesses. Julian later rebuilt his businesses, beginning again from his furniture line, which he had started in 1994 and not consolidated under the venture fund.

Julian designed the uniform for the Charlotte Hornets when they joined the NBA, and re-designed the University of North Carolina Tar Heels men's basketball uniforms. He created the trademark argyle pattern down the sides of the uniform, added bolder trim, and used different fabrics for the 1991-92 season upon Dean Smith's request. He also designed the stadium seating at Charlotte’s Knights Stadium for the Charlotte Knights minor-league baseball team in 1990, using seats in fourteen different colors to create a pattern not unlike a textile pattern.

In the early 1970s, Julian modernized traditional menswear with innovative new silhouettes and fabrics while introducing new colors and color combinations becoming the first American fashion designer to design his own cloth. In 1981, he started a successful menswear clothing line called "Colours by Alexander Julian". His textile design is part of the Smithsonian's permanent collection. Later, he branched out to furniture and home furnishings, and in 2008 moved his furniture licensing to Vaughan-Bassett.

In 1990 Julian designed the apparel for the Newman-Haas IndyCar team, including drivers Mario and Michael Andretti.

Julian was the costume designer for the 1992 Robert Altman film, The Player. In 2014 he designed a line of men's moisture-wicking cycling shirts that can be worn to lunch or the office after cyclings — for the Chapel Hill company, Performance Bicycle.
