= John Kloss =

American fashion designer (1937–1987)

- Born: John Klosowski; June 13, 1937; Detroit, Michigan, U.S.
- Died: March 25, 1987 (aged 49); Stamford, Connecticut, U.S.
- Education: Traphagen School of Fashion
- Occupation: Fashion Designer
- Years active: 1958–1987

John Kloss, born as John Klosowski (13 June 1937 – 25 March 1987) was an American fashion designer, known for his modern lingerie and sleepwear designs.

== History ==
John Klosowski was born 13 June 1937 in Detroit, Michigan. He studied at Cass Technical High School, learning about architecture. He moved to New York City and studied at Traphagen School of Fashion, graduating in 1958 in Costume Design. After briefly living in Paris, in 1963 he moved back to New York City and opened a custom dressmaking business. Henri Bendel, a women's accessories store based in New York City was credited with discovering John Kloss and providing him with early work.

His dresses in the 1960s were unconstructed jersey and crepe fabric, but worn tight to show the body shape. By the 1970s his dresses were more loose in shape.

Kloss received two Coty Awards, in 1971 and 1974, for his lingerie designs. His 1970s line of bras had an impact on the lingerie industry, John Kloss Glossies made by Lily of France, came in five bold colors, seamless, minimal, but still an underwired bra - for a braless-look.

He died at the age of 49 on 25 March 1987 in his home in Stamford, Connecticut from a carbon monoxide poisoning-related suicide. According to the New York Times, "Mr. Kloss had been under severe pressure because of tax problems in recent years, according to business associates."

Kloss' work is found in many public museum collections including at the Metropolitan Museum of Art (The Met), Victoria and Albert Museum, among others.
