= Bill Tice =

American fashion designer

Bill Tice (died March 9, 1995) was an American fashion designer known for his loungewear. He received a Coty Award in 1974.
