= Stan Herman =

American fashion designer

- Born: Stanley M. Herman; September 17, 1928 (age 97); Brooklyn, New York, U.S.
- Education: University of Cincinnati, Traphagen School of Fashion
- Occupation: Designer
- Years active: 1960s-
- Website: http://stanhermanstudio.com/

Stan M. Herman (born September 17, 1928) is an American fashion designer. He was President of the Council of Fashion Designers of America (CFDA), a position he held until 2006 at which time Diane von Fürstenberg took over the position. He is also known worldwide for his leading edge corporate uniforms.

== Early life ==
Stanley M. Herman was born in Brooklyn, New York, and grew up in a Jewish family in Passaic, New Jersey, His father owned a chain of silk shops. where he attended Passaic High School. Herman graduated in 1950 from the College of Design, Architecture, Art, and Planning at the University of Cincinnati. He continued his studies at the Traphagen School of Fashion, graduating in 1952 in Costume Design. Herman then served in the United States Army during the Korean War.

After the War, Herman moved to New York City. Fired from his first fashion design job, he worked in Broadway theatre at night while designing part-time during the day. He left show business to pursue fashion full-time after launching his first collection, which Women's Wear Daily declared an unqualified success. Herman then became head designer for ready-to-wear company Mr. Mort on Seventh Avenue.

== Career ==
Herman first designed a uniform after a request from the president of the Avis car rental company. He has since designed uniforms for many well-known companies such as Amtrak, Federal Express, JetBlue, Avis, Loews Hotels & Resorts, McDonald's, Trans World Airlines (TWA), U.S. Airways and United Airlines.

He served as president of the Council of Fashion Designers of America (CFDA) from 1991 to 2006. In 1993, Herman and CFDA executive director Fern Mallis consolidated the events known as New York Fashion Week by staging them in white tents in Bryant Park, branding it as "7th on Sixth".

Herman has designed a loungewear and sleepwear collection for QVC since 1993.

== Awards ==
Herman won three Coty Awards, between 1969 and 1974.

In 2006, Herman was awarded the Geoffrey Beene Lifetime Achievement Award by the CFDA.

He received an honorary doctorate from the University of Cincinnati in 2008.

== Personal life ==
At 24, Stan Herman met Gene Horowitz, a teacher and writer, with whom he was in a relationship for 39 years, until Horowitz died in 1991.
