= Bill Atkinson (designer) =

American fashion designer

William Atkinson (1916–1995) was an American architect and fashion designer working in the American sportswear style.

== Early life ==
Atkinson was born in Troy, New York, in 1916. He studied architecture and landscaping at Cornell University and worked for MGM as a set designer and Chrysler before launching a private architectural practice in 1945. He won the Prix de Rome for architecture in 1940. He was also a keen nature and fashion photographer.

== Fashion career ==
During World War II Atkinson made a skirt for his first wife out of bandanas as a way of getting around government rationing, which led to requests for similar garments and in 1950, he started a firm called Glen of Michigan in collaboration with a contractor. He designed sportswear (an American term for separates and relaxed dressing, rather than activewear for sports) collections for the Milwaukee-based firm, as well as heading up its childrenswear and junior lines. However Atkinson also offered actual sporting clothing, and in 1957 Sports Illustrated voted him Designer of the Year for his calico, corduroy and tweed designs which were equally wearable for traveling, spectating sports, or while playing golf and similar sports. He went on to collaborate with Sports Illustrated on a collection of golfing clothing for Spring 1958.

He finally created a design consultancy in 1970 called Presentations, and in 1974, in partnership with his second wife Jeanne Atkinson, a consultant in the fashion industry, created Bill Atkinson Inc. The company specialized in sportswear which was offered at reasonable bridge price points (bridging the gap between expensive and budget lines), one of the first to do so before it became a common fashion manufacturing practice.

In 1978, the Coty jury voted for him to receive that year's Coty Award for fashion design, and the following year, he won a Dallas Fashion Award. He sold his business to the Toronto-based sportswear company Highland Queen in 1982, officially retired from the fashion industry in 1984, and bought his name back from Highland Queen in 1985.

== Personal life and death ==
Atkinson was married twice. His first, to Sylvia F. Weaver, ended in divorce in 1960. He and Jeanne divorced in 1986. He died 20 August 1995 at home in Westport, Connecticut, of natural causes.
