= Victor Joris =

American fashion designer

- Born: April 25, 1929; Shreveport, Louisiana, U.S.
- Died: March 12, 2013 (aged 83); Shreveport, Louisiana, U.S.
- Resting place: Northwest Louisiana Veteran's Cemetery
- Education: Traphagen School of Fashion, École de la chambre syndicale de la couture parisienne
- Occupation: Fashion Designer
- Years active: 1945–1970s
- Awards: Coty Award (1969)

Victor Joris (1929–2013) was an American fashion designer and fashion illustrator. He was active between 1945 until the 1970s.

== Biography ==
Born April 25, 1929, in Shreveport, Louisiana. He attended C.E. Byrd High School. He went on to study fashion at Traphagen School of Fashion in New York City, graduating in 1945 in Costume Design and Sketching. He moved to Paris and studied at School Of Chambre Syndicale De La Couture Parisienne (École de la Chambre Syndicale de la Couture Parisienne) which is part of Fédération Française de la Couture. In Paris he was an assistant to fashion designers, Christian Dior and Pierre Balmain. Joris served two years in the United States Army, followed by a move to Hollywood to work for Columbia Pictures. At Columbia he worked with movie costume designer, Jean Louis. He eventually moved back to New York City and worked with Cuddlecoat New York and with the Jones Apparel Group, where he designed the Christian Dior Designer Sportswear Collection and the Jones New York line of women's apparel.

Joris pioneered the design of women's apparel including pantsuits, long coats and long sweater jackets.

His fashion design work was frequently featured publications such as Harper’s Bazaar and Women’s Wear Daily. Joris won a Special Award from the Coty Award in 1965 as a young designer and he won the Coty Award "Winnie" in 1969 for his Cuddlecoat New York designs. Some of his clients included Jacqueline Kennedy, Lady Bird Johnson, Pat Nixon, Julie Christie.

In the 1970s, after retiring from fashion, Joris began dog breeding and showing Shih Tzu dogs.

== Death and legacy ==
He died March 12, 2013, at the age of 83, in Shreveport, Louisiana and was laid to rest in Northwest Louisiana Veteran's Cemetery in Keithville, Louisiana.

Joris' work is in public permanent collections including the Metropolitan Museum of Art, Philadelphia Museum of Art, among others.
