= Kieselstein-Cord =

American design and fine art company

- Industry: Design, Fine Art
- Founder: Barry Kieselstein-Cord
- Headquarters: New York City, United States

Kieselstein-Cord (/ˈkiːzəlstaɪn/) is a brand founded by American designer, artist, and photographer Barry Kieselstein-Cord in 1972 in Manhattan, New York. Its products include jewelry, silver jewelry, belt buckles, bronze statuary, leather goods including handbags, eyewear, home furnishings, and accessories.

The designer has worked with Calvin Klein and Perry Ellis. The brand has been featured in a variety of internationally prominent publications including: Forbes, Los Angeles Times, The Times, The New York Times, Newsweek, Time, People, Robb Report, Vibe, Vogue, and The Wall Street Journal.

The brand has been featured on several films including: Sex and the City, E!, Law & Order, Hard Copy, CNN, and NY1.

The brand designation derives from the designer's original family names: Von Kieselstein and Winercord, originating from Austrian-German ancestry. Branches of the family immigrated to the U.S. from the mid-1800s to 1900.

== History ==
=== Early years ===
After graduating Parsons School of Design in combination with a program at New York University, Kieselstein-Cord entered the field of advertising where he won several awards including the Illustrators Society Award (New York), the International Hollywood Radio & Television Society Award, and multiple Art Directors Club of New York Awards. In 1972, he founded Kieselstein-Cord, with the mission to create a totally vertical American luxury company from basic concept to retail platform based on the historic precedence of French ateliers under King Louis XIV, and not dissimilar to the concept of Louis Comfort Tiffany's earliest establishment. However, Kieselstein-Cord built his firm with a unique, contemporary vision.

=== 1970s–present ===
In 1971, Kieselstein-Cord began experimenting with sterling, however, the bulk of his early work was produced with plastic remnants left over from the 1930s and 1940s. By late 1971, he had progressed to sterling and natural materials, such as seasonally discarded deer-horns and leather trimmings. His first significant sale was to Bob M Lee, a big-game hunter and then owner of the Hunting World stores. The resulting profits from that sale allowed Kieselstein-Cord the facility to purchase his first large scale amount of sterling silver. Based on the accumulation of that material, he produced his first full sterling collection in 1972. The collection was presented to George Jensen's general merchandise manager, Charles Dishman. Dishman referred Cord to Remica Russell, the fine jewelry buyer for George Jensen. Russell agreed to buy the collection and represent Kieselstein-Cord at Jensen's U.S. flagship store on Madison Avenue in New York City. The debut of Kieselstein-Cord at Jensen was an immediate success and led to the start of an international following. Among the many fans Kieselstein-Cord started to develop was the famous Spanish bullfighter El Cordobés, who bought the designer's large horse-head buckle, Diane Keaton, Cat Stevens, Liz Smith, and others. 1972 to '75 were pertinent growing years for the brand. Increasing publicity and groundbreaking design direction afforded Kieselstein-Cord extensive coverage in the national press. At this juncture, Kieselstein-Cord started touring the country to expand his business. He established the brand in secondary cities across the United States (i.e. Oklahoma City, OK, Cleveland, OH, Louisville, KY, etc.). His primary goal was large scale distribution of exquisite handmade luxury products through America's leading specialty retailers at that time (i.e. Saks Fifth Avenue, Henri Bendel, and Bonwit Teller among others). Among these retailers was Lou Lattimore in Dallas, TX, where Kieselstein-Cord's products captured the eye of the then women's fashion buyer CeCe Eddy (later to become Kieselstein-Cord's wife and lifestyle brand model, now divorced and known today as CeCe Cord). During this period of growth, Kieselstein-Cord began to expand his employee base, bringing in young, talented, international craftspeople, and imbuing them with his mission and dedication to his artistic design vision.

In 1972, Valentino fashion director Eve Orton introduced Kieselstein-Cord to Calvin Klein. In 1973, Klein won his first Coty Award, showcasing Kieselstein-Cord's designs on his models. Klein continued to showcase Kieselstein-Cord's designs with his work, up through winning his second Coty Award in 1974. By 1979, Kieselstein-Cord, now a recognized American luxury brand, won his first Coty Award. In 1973, Kieselstein-Cord created a seminal piece for Mick Jagger's 30th birthday: a sterling silver skull necklace.

In 1976 The designer introduced one of the most important divisions of his company, which were status belt buckles. Although the price points were considered high for the time—$275 for a sterling silver buckle on an alligator strap—they were an aesthetic breakthrough and an incomparable value. The collection allowed Keiselstein-Cord to enter a broader market. Andre Leon Talley of Women's Wear Daily was the first to cover the collection, and later interviewed Kieselstein-Cord in Interview Magazine. Talley's story caught the eye of Jade Hobson at Vogue. Within six months of its introduction, Kieselstein-Cord's now famous, seminal Winchester buckle appeared on fourteen consecutive pages of Vogue, photographed by Helmut Newton. This catapulted the already rising Kieselstein-Cord to stardom, which allowed his work to reach a larger, sophisticated, and fashionable audience eager to embrace new symbols of status and success. The increasing sales of the buckles and popularity of the designs facilitated an economic boom for the company in a generally recessionary period. This resulted in an expansion of Kieselstein-Cord's production and design capabilities. Despite the fact that ever-increasing commodity prices were shrinking the general consumer's appetite for precious metals-products, the artist-designer continued to expand in the face of high demand for his work.

This period also ushered in a collaboration with designer Perry Ellis. Kieselstein-Cord designs began to appear in Ellis' runway shows. Further, Ellis allowed Kieselstein-Cord to showcase his work post-shows in the Perry Ellis showroom. As a thank-you, Kieselstein-Cord designed and produced a unique set of sterling silver baby duck candlesticks to run the length of Ellis' dining room table. The association served as a springboard to prominence for the brand and continued for many years. English writer Jonathan Moore profiled this in his posthumous book about Perry Ellis.

During the course of working with Ellis, Kieselstein-Cord had the first opportunity to work with Isaac Mizrahi. In 1991 Kieselstein-Cord introduced its first purse collections, which included the Alligator Trophy bag, which can be seen in the Met and the Louvre. Six years later in 1997 Kieselstein-Cord introduced its first eyewear collections. In late 2010, after thirty-eight consecutive years, Barry Kieselstein-Cord placed his company on a limited period of hiatus. In late 2012, he reemerged to enter a new period of activity, marked by the successful publication of his first book, Awarded—the first step in the company's return to full-time active business. During the artist's absence, designated employees have continued to support the brand.
