= Jeanne S. Campbell =

American fashion designer

Jeanne S. Campbell (1919–2002) was an American fashion designer active from the 1940s to the 1970s. She was part of the American sportswear movement alongside Bonnie Cashin and Claire McCardell.

== Biography ==
Jeanne grew up in Pittsburgh, and studied at the Pittsburgh Art Institute. After graduating, she opened her own business in Clearwater, Florida, near her family's summer home. Following the outbreak of World War II, Jeanne joined the Civil Aeronautics Administration as a cartographer, where she met her future husband, Lieutenant Edward A. Campbell. They had a son and daughter, Edward and Jean. Jean described her mother as being strong-willed and stern but nontraditional, and fiercely ambitious, maintaining a well-groomed appearance while also being prepared to do hard work herself, such as putting up a ceiling. In 1964, Jeanne divorced Edward Campbell, and moved to Westhampton, New York, where she ran a bed-and-breakfast business from a house that they had converted there. She continued to commute from Westhampton to work until her retirement in 1977, while maintaining the bed-and-breakfast business until shortly before her death.

Jeanne Campbell died in 2002 following a stroke, aged 82, at her daughter's home in Oxford, New York, survived by her children and her ex-husband.

== Career ==
The Campbells relocated to New York after the War, and Jeanne started working as a designer for a company called Loomtags. During her time there she won a 1951 Merit Award from Mademoiselle, and was recruited the same year to design for Sportswhirl under the "Jeanne Campbell for Sportwhirl” label.

Campbell was known for her classic, understated designs that were designed to be stylish rather than trendy, and described her work as "a no-age, no-price look, and it's up to the person who wears it to make the look.” One of her signature designs was the sheath dress, which she is credited with popularizing. She was credited with helping popularize the market for affordable separates in the mid-20th century. Her designs were modeled on magazine covers such as Vogue, Harper's Bazaar and Glamour, and worn by Ava Gardner, Lynda Bird Johnson, and Liza Minnelli. In 1961, Life cited Campbell as one of the leading designers of junior fashion alongside Anne Fogarty, Anne Klein and Eloise Curtis; specifically noting Campbell's unusual colour use and surprising fabrics as well as her affordability. The four women were also noted as being multiple award-winning "influential stylesetters" who, by wearing their own clothes, proved that wearing "junior fashion" was not about being young, but having the right attitude and personal style.

Campbell was awarded the 1955 Coty Award for her knit sheaths, and the 1958 American Sportswear Designer of the Year Award from Sports Illustrated. The latter award, which was voted for by six hundred fashion retailers and executives, was the first time that all the winners of the Sports Illustrated Award had been women, with the other recipients being Bonnie Cashin and the swimwear designer Rose Marie Reid, who each received a newly-designed trophy depicting a wire dress form. Campbell's trophy was inscribed "To the women's sportswear designer who, during the past year, has made the most significant contribution to American sportswear through a specific collection, idea or innovation." Later, in 1970, she was one of 15 American designers to be named by Women's Wear Daily as the Women of the Year.

Campbell retired from Sportwhirl in 1977, but continued to support young designers both in New York at the Parsons School of Design as an instructor and judge, and regularly traveling abroad as a consultant to fashion industries and a fashion design tutor in Barbados and Peru. When she died, Parsons established a scholarship in her name.
