= Fabrice Simon =

American painter

- Born: Fabrice Simon; January 29, 1951; Port-au-Prince, Haiti
- Died: July 29, 1998 (aged 47); New York City, New York, U.S.
- Education: Fashion Institute of Technology
- Occupations: Fashion designer, artist

Fabrice Simon (January 29, 1951 – July 29, 1998) was a Haitian-American abstract artist and fashion designer, best known for his handmade beaded party dresses that were popular during the 1980s.

Simon immigrated to America in 1964, and subsequently attended the Fashion Institute of Technology. He won a special Coty Award in 1981. His clientele included many celebrities, among them socialite Cornelia Guest and singer-actress Whitney Houston.

== Death ==
On July 29, 1998, Simon died of AIDS in New York City at the age of 47.
