= Andrew Fezza =

American fashion designer

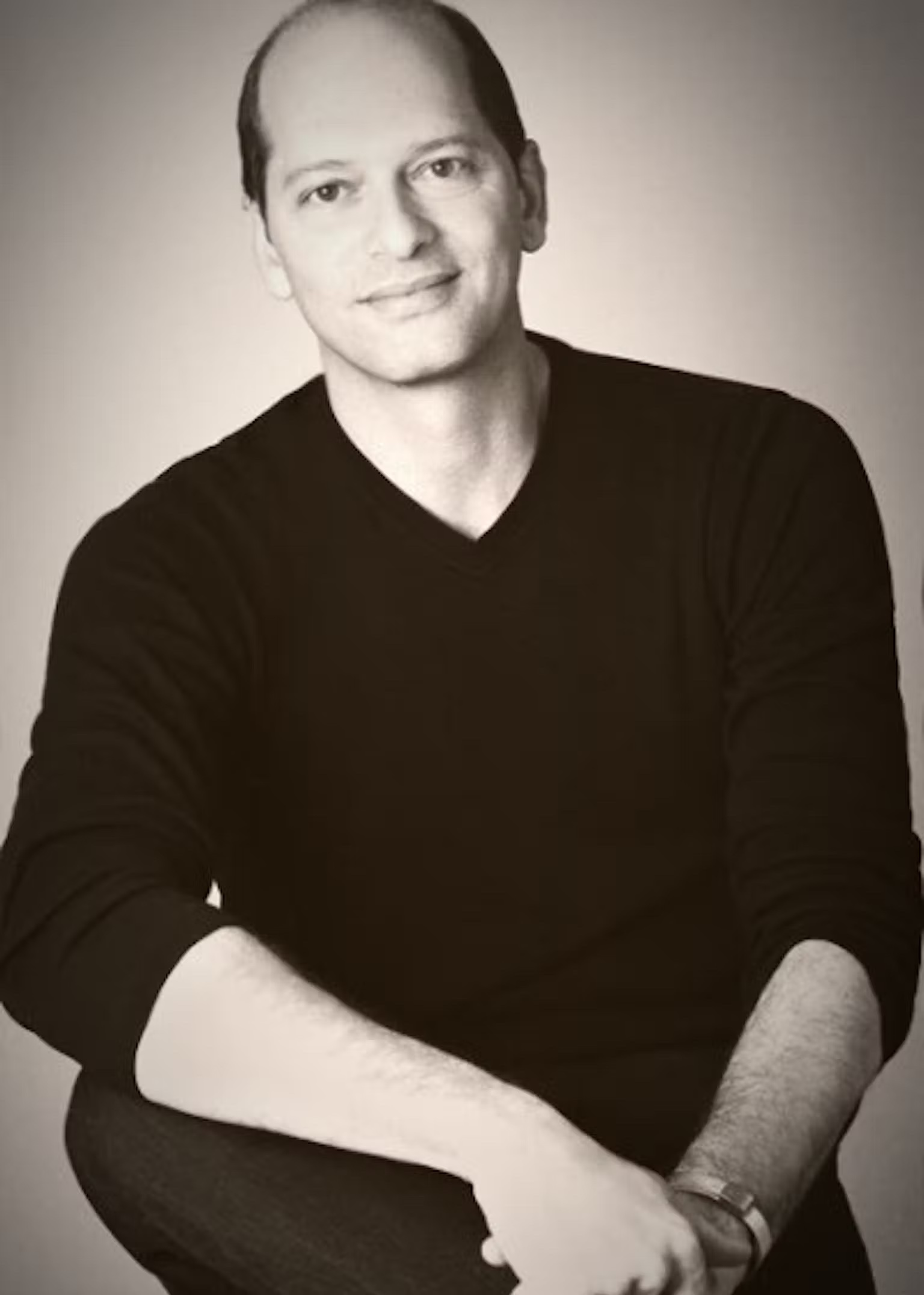
- Born: 1955 (age 70–71); Connecticut
- Education: Boston College, Fashion Institute of Technology
- Known for: Fashion design
- Spouse: Marilyn Fezza
- Website: www.andrewfezza.com

Andrew Fezza is an Italian American menswear designer, sometimes described as the "Giorgio Armani of America".

== Early life ==
Andrew Fezza was born in 1955 in Connecticut, and studied biology and sociology at Boston College with the intention of becoming a dentist. Following a visit to Florence where he saw Italian fashions first hand, he enrolled at the Fashion Institute of Technology in New York where he met his future wife, Marilyn.

== Career ==
After graduation, Fezza worked as a design assistant for the womenswear company Schrader Sport on Seventh Avenue, while producing a line of men's sweaters in the evenings that were bought by the New York menswear shop 'Camouflage'. In 1979, he and his future wife, Marilyn, launched their apparel company in a small apartment in Greenwich Village, specializing in men's sportswear and leather clothing. They added a womenswear line in 1984, which was designed by Marilyn.

Andrew Fezza was presented by the GFT USA Corporation (a subsidiary of the Italian company Gruppo GFT), which had already provided support to the successful designers Emanuel Ungaro, Louis Féraud and Valentino, and launched Giorgio Armani to fame. GFT, who in 1988, retailed Armani suits for $700–900 apiece, wanted to offer comparable quality but lower-priced (at $300–400) suits to the consumer with a tighter clothing budget, and following market research, decided that their new line needed a name designer, ideally a young American creating European-style garments. Fezza fit this profile, and as he was not a "big star", would not cost GFT too much money to acquire. His Firma line, offering the Armani look for lower prices, was a commercial success, and Fezza, according to the GFT marketing and image people, was "a designer people can relate to." Although the Firma line was in demand, GFT were careful to limit its availability, stating in 1988 that they were "building a whole romantic image [...] creating a hero" and wanted to keep the line exclusive and avoid overselling. By 1992, Andrew and Marilyn Fezza were taking in $21 million a year in clothing sales.

In 1992, Fezza left GFT, launching his solo collections for spring 1993. His plan was to shift the focus of the Andrew Fezza brand to sportswear rather than tailoring, and offer more unisex clothing under his Fez brand, which he introduced in 1991. He also reduced prices, making his products more affordable, selling shirts for $75 rather than $150, and sport coats for $175 to $325, rather than $375–550.

In 2010, Andrew and Marilyn created a multimedia production company called Seven Sisters Productions, LLC. 7Sisters Media is a global female empowerment platform "designed to disrupt mainstream media and create intelligent, meaningful programming tailored to young women."

== Awards ==
In 1984, Fezza was the last recipient of the Coty Award for menswear. His win was seen as significant as the Coty Awards had been criticized for becoming too predictable. Fezza had previously been nominated in 1981, when he received a Menswear Special Award following an executive decision by the organisers that, as Calvin Klein, Geoffrey Beene, and Ralph Lauren had all rejected their Cotys, all nominees would receive an award.

Fezza has also received the Council of Fashion Designers of America Award for Menswear, the Cutty Sark Award for Outstanding Designer, and the Chrysler/Cartier Stargazer Award for Best New American Designer.
