= Celia Sebiri =

American jewelry designer

Celia Sebiri (1913-2006) was an American jewelry designer active in the 1940s-1980s.

== Biography ==
Sebiri was born 17 March 1913, and studied at Hunter College. Her husband was a meat broker, and in the 1970s, they lived on Greenwich Square, Washington. She died on 1 April 2006, aged 93, in New York. Her daughter, Karen Sebiri, also became a jewelry designer.

== Jewelry design ==
As a jewelry designer Sebiri was known particularly for her work in silver, which she treated as if it were more valuable than it already was. She also worked with natural materials including ivory and tortoiseshell, although the Endangered Species Act of 1973 led to Bonwit Teller having to take her work off sale after they and she realized that the hawksbill sea turtle was an endangered species. In 1974 Sebiri described her inspirations as coming from anywhere from passages of literature to dried up leaves.

In 1973 Sebiri won one of two Special Coty Awards for jewelry (that year's other jewelry Coty recipient was Michael Moraux of Dubaux) for her work, which was described as sinuous and featuring animal motifs. In the 1980s she designed jewelry for Avon.
