= Pablo Manzoni =

Italian make-up artist (1939–2022)

Pablo Manzoni (15 July 1939 – 2 February 2022) was an Italian make-up artist who, as Pablo of Elizabeth Arden, was awarded the Coty Award in 1965 for leadership in cosmetics.

== Biography ==
Manzoni was born Count Paolo Michaelangelo Zappi-Manzoni di Giovecca in Bologna, Italy, son of Count Ubaldo Zappi-Manzoni di Giovecca, a surgeon, and wife Ersilia Monti. He is technically Count Pablo Manzoni, although he stated in 1985 that he does not use his title.

At the age of 17, Manzoni persuaded the Elizabeth Arden salon in Rome to employ him, despite his lack of experience. Whilst there, he worked with clients such as Sophia Loren, for whom he used his trademark eyebrow-bleaching technique to enhance her eyes. Another early Manzoni trademark was the use of false eyelashes. At 24, Manzoni relocated to Manhattan, New York, where from 1964 to 1979, known only as "Pablo," he was creative director for Elizabeth Arden. In 1965, his eye-makeup techniques were so influential that he was awarded the Coty Award in recognition for launching a worldwide style. As a leader in the field of fashionable, elaborate eye-makeup, Pablo was extremely popular with fashion editors and society women during the 1960s. Manzoni stated in 1966 that the jewel-studded or flower-decorated eyes he created for the fashion press were intended to inspire the reader, rather than to be exactly copied. Despite this, he had clients asking him to reproduce the designs for actual wear. In 2011 Manzoni expanded on this, explaining that the "festive eyes" he created for Vogue and Harper's Bazaar were intended for shock value and publicity purposes, but that when at work he created subtle make-up for clients.

In 1979 Manzoni left Elizabeth Arden to embark upon a solo career, for which he reclaimed his surname. By 1985, as well as dealing with private clients, Manzoni was working as a make-up consultant for Neiman Marcus. In 1990, he was Creative Director for the La Prairie cosmetics line.

Manzoni died from complications from back surgery on 2 February 2022, at the age of 82.
