= Bill Kaiserman =

American fashion designer (1942–2020)

- Born: William Jay Kaiserman; September 8, 1942; Brooklyn, New York, U.S.
- Died: January 20, 2020 (aged 77); Manhattan, New York, U.S.
- Occupation: Fashion Designer
- Spouse(s): Mildred Jo Lyons (divorce); Angelina Rosario Rodriguez (until his death)

William Jay "Bill" Kaiserman (1942 – 2020) was an American fashion designer, and a four-time Coty Award-winning designer (1974; 1975; 1976; 1978).

Kaiserman established a design studio in the Italian design community in Milan, and developed a designer business in Europe and Asia. He was awarded the Cavaliere Del Lavoro (Knight for Labour) award from the Italian government for his role in developing Italy's reputation in design, fabric and production innovation.

== Early life ==
He was born 8 September 1942 in Brooklyn, New York. He studied acting with Uta Hagen, before pursuing fashion design.

== Career ==
He was a self taught designer and founded the Rafael Company in 1970. He entered women's wear in 1976. By 1979, the company had US$30 million in sales for its men's and women's collections business, which included sportswear, clothing, eveningwear and swimwear. The designer also developed an international clothing licensing business (Van Gils, Netherlands) under the Bill Kaiserman Label. During this time Bill Kaiserman also won three Coty awards as well as the first ever Hall of Fame award for Best American Designer.

In 1982, Bill Kaiserman moved to Milan, Italy, to develop an international designer business under Bill Kaiserman Label. During the eighties and through partnerships with international companies like Mitsui, and Kashiyana, the Bill Kaiserman Label grew in popularity in Europe, Asia and America.

In the early 1990s, Bill Kaiserman returned to the U.S. to develop a U.S. licensing business with companies like Hartz & Co.; Format; Mondo, Inc, and American Fashion, Inc. He has helped other labels by designing new collections, such as Avirex's AVX line.

In 1997, Bill Kaiserman created Skin Finish, a revolutionary new coating for fabrics that is patent-pending. In 1998, Bill Kaiserman launched Skins, a street-wear inspired sportswear collection for men and women. Skins being sold to American department and specialty stores. In 2000, he introduced Skins, a streetwear-inspired sportswear collection for men and women.

== Family ==
He married Mildred Jo Lyons in 1971 and that marriage ended in divorce. His second marriage was to Angelina Rosario Rodriguez in 1990.

He died 20 January 2020 in Manhattan, New York, from complications from a stroke and pneumonia.
