= Laura Pearson =

American fashion designer

Laura Pearson is an American former fashion designer specializing in knitwear under the Tijuca label. She won a Special Coty Award in 1981 for her knitwear, which was particularly successful through the 1980s.

== Career ==
Pearson had never studied fashion before, in her early 20s, she traveled to Brazil and Ecuador and met Ecuadorean knitters who were part of a cooperative started by the Peace Corps. After first starting out by importing Ecuadorean sweaters for one season, in 1976, Pearson decided to start designing her own knitwear under the Tijuca label back in New York. At first, she employed 30 Ecuadorean workers to knit her designs, a number which increased to 150 by 1982. At the time, her sweaters, for both men and women, were unlike anything else seen on the market, with their textures, boldness and use of South American Indian motifs, and she won a Special Coty Award in 1981. In 1987, The New York Times described Tijuca's sweaters as retaining a human element in their "thick, burly feel", and described how the original craftspeople had dyed the wool in cauldrons over open fires.

Pearson subsequently diversified into socks, and was then employed by the Signal Apparel Corporation to create mass-produced cotton machine-knits under the "Laura Pearson USA" label. While the cotton knits retained Pearson's signature bold graphics and textures on simple shapes such as cardigans, jackets, and mix-and-match skirts and pants, they were designed to be comfortable, have a long fashionable life and remain stylish for years rather than in the short term. Designs had names like "Laura's Backyard", "Falling Leaves" and "Barn Door", and were inspired by a wide range of sources, including the designer's own backyard at her home in Sag Harbor, New York. One design for Fall-Winter 1986-7 was inspired by aerial views of Uruguayan farms. She described her work as art-to-wear, and in 1988, the Deseret News described her work as "Sweater collectibles."

Her fashion business ran for 25 years. Pearson moved to Sarasota, Florida in 2009 and now works as a realtor.
