= Helen Lee (fashion designer) =

American children's fashion designer

- Born: 1909; Knoxville, Tennessee, US
- Education: University of Tennessee; Art Students League (New York); Traphagen School of Art (New York)
- Occupation: designer of children clothes
- Awards: Coty Award in 1953; Neiman-Marcus Award in 1958; Ethel Traphagen Award in 1970

Helen Lee Caldwell (1909 – March 13, 1991) was an American fashion designer of children's clothes. She founded her own label, Designs by Helen Lee Inc., in 1955.

== Biography ==
She was born in Knoxville, Tennessee, in 1909. She studied at University of Tennessee before moving to New York City and studying at the Art Students League of New York and at the Traphagen School of Fashion (class of 1926, Costume Design).

She worked as a fashion designer for Youngland Inc., Sears, Roebuck & Company, Saks Fifth Avenue, Alyssa and her own company, Designs by Helen Lee Inc., creating clothes for boys and girls.

She won the main fashion prizes: in 1953 she won the Coty Award for her “significant influences in the development of good taste and charm in children’s fashion” and she received the Neiman Marcus Fashion Award in 1958. She was also the winner of the Etherl Traphagen Award in 1970. She created many patterns for McCall's.

She retired in the late 1970s. She died on March 13, 1991, in Knoxville, Tennessee.
