= Council of Fashion Designers of America =

American trade association

Coordinates: 40.726267°N 73.995138°W

- Abbreviation: CFDA
- Formation: 1962; 64 years ago
- Founder: Eleanor Lambert
- Type: Trade association
- Legal status: Nonprofit organization
- Purpose: To strengthen the impact of American fashion in the global economy
- Location: Manhattan, New York City
- Fields: Fashion
- Members: 428 (2024)
- Chairman: Thom Browne
- CEO: Steven Kolb
- Website: cfda.com

The Council of Fashion Designers of America, Inc. (CFDA), founded in 1962 by publicist Eleanor Lambert, and headquartered in Manhattan, is a not-for-profit trade association comprising a membership of over 370 American fashion and accessory designers. The organization promotes American designers' participation in the global economy.

In addition to hosting the annual CFDA Fashion Awards, the organization develops future American design talent through scholarships and resources in colleges, and postgraduate schools. The CFDA also provides funding and business opportunities for working designers. Through the CFDA Foundation, the organization engages in various charitable activities.

== History ==
The first president of the CFDA was Sydney Wragge (1962–1965). Founding members included Bill Blass, Donald Brooks, Betty Carol, Jane Derby, Luis Estevez, David Evins, Rudi Gernreich, Helen Lee, Bud Kilpatrick, Jean Louis, John Moore, Norman Norell, Sylvia Pedlar, Sarmi, Arnold Scaasi, Adele Simpson, Gustave Tassell, Pauline Trigère, Sydney Wragge, and Ben Zuckerman.

Diane von Furstenberg served as chairman for 13 years from 2006 until 2019, followed by Tom Ford, who served for three years. As of January 2023, Thom Browne is the group's chairman. Steven Kolb was the CEO and President from 2006 to 2026.

== CFDA Fashion Awards ==
The CFDA Fashion Awards were founded in 1980 with the first awards given in 1981. They honor and showcase excellence in fashion design. They have been sometimes referred to as "the Oscars of fashion". In 1997, the CFDA Fashion Awards began including emerging designers.

Nominations are submitted by the Fashion Guild, a group of over 1,500 CFDA members including fashion editors, retailers, and stylists. Award winners are determined by vote and announced at an annual black tie event held in Manhattan.

Since 2022, Amazon Fashion is the presenting sponsor of the event.

Winners of the fund include Telfar Clemens (2017), Kerby Jean-Raymond of Pyer Moss (2018), Christopher John Rogers (2019), and Melitta Baumeister (2023).

== Programs ==
The CFDA pursues a range of programs aimed at designers, students, at the industry at large.

Current and recent programs include:

For Designers:

- CFDA/Vogue Fashion Fund
- CFDA | Genesis Aouse AAPI Design + Innovation Grant
- CFDA x eBay Circular Fashion Fund
- Tiffany & Co. x CFDA Jewelry Designer Award

For Students:

- The CFDA Scholarship Fund includES the Veronica Beard Creative Futures Scholarship and The Geoffrey Beene Award among others. Past recipients include Peter Do (2013), Michelle Ochs (2006) AND Jack Mcollough (20010.

=== CFDA/Vogue Fashion Fund ===
The CFDA/Vogue Fashion Fund was established to help emerging designers and cultivate the next generation of American fashion talent.

=== Tiffany & Co. x CFDA Jewelry Designer Award ===
Established in 2024, the CFDA partners with Tiffany & Co. for the stated purpose of recognizing and uplifting outstanding American jewelry designers who are committed to driving inclusivity with the design industry. Awarded recipients are selected by a committee of industry experts.

=== Fashion Targets Breast Cancer ===
Since 2011, the council has led an annual campaign to promote the initiative and partners with well known fashion icons. In 2017, Fabletics partnered with Fashion Targets Breast Cancer to produce an activewear collection. A portion of all sales for the collection would be donated to target breast cancer screening and treatment.

== Publications ==
CFDA publications include:

- American Fashion Home
- American Travel
- Scheips, Charlie (2007). American Fashion. Council of Fashion Designers of America (CFDA). Assouline Publishing. ISBN 978-2759401611.
- Hastreiter, Kim; Beene, Geoffrey (2008). Geoffrey Beene: An American Fashion Rebel. Assouline Publishing. ISBN 9782759402663.
- Pratts Price, Candy; Glasscock, Jessica; Tavee, Art (2008). American Fashion Accessories. Council of Fashion Designers of America (CFDA). Assouline Publishing. ISBN 9782759402861.
- Marsh, Lisa; Stewart, Martha (2009). American Fashion Cookbook. Council of Fashion Designers of America (CFDA). Assouline Publisher. ISBN 9782759404056.
- Bryan, Robert E. (2009). American Fashion Menswear. Assouline Publishing. ISBN 9782759404094.
- Suqi, Rima A. (2010). American Fashion Designers at Home. Council of Fashion Designers of America (CFDA). Assouline Publishing. ISBN 9782759404711.
- Mears, Patricia (2012). IMPACT: 50 Years of the CFDA. Council of Fashion Designers of America (CFDA). Harry N. Abrams. ISBN 978-1419702310.
- Von Furstenberg, Diane; Alba, Jessica (2014). The Pursuit of Style: Advice and Musings from America's Top Fashion Designers. Council of Fashion Designers of America (CFDA). Harry N. Abrams. ISBN 978-1419706219.
- Systrom, Kevin; Kolb, Steven (2015). Designers on Instagram: #fashion. Council of Fashion Designers of America (CFDA). Harry N. Abrams. ISBN 978-1419715587.
- Moore, Booth (2018). American Runway: 75 Years of Fashion and the Front Row. Council of Fashion Designers of America (CFDA). Harry N. Abrams. ISBN 978-1419726484.
