= Tzaims Luksus =

American artist and fashion designer

Tzaims Luksus (born James Henry Luksus, January 1, 1932) is an American artist and fashion designer. Luksus worked as a lecturer and consultant at the Fashion Institute of Technology.

== Biography ==
Luksus was born in Chicago, Illinois, U.S. on January 1, 1932, the son of John James [Prince Ivan Yusefovitch Yusupov-Luksiev] and Beulah Maude Wingfield-Driver-Luksus. He studied architecture at the University of Pennsylvania, the Pennsylvania Academy of the Fine Arts (1956) and the University of the Arts and continued studies of fine art at the Atlanta Art Institute, L'accademia di belli arti di Venezia and the Art Academy of Florence, Massachusetts and fine art and Medieval Studies at St Edmund Hall at Oxford University in England.

=== Career ===
Since his interest in architecture was based upon classical Greek and architecture of the Italian Renaissance, he was not interested in structural steel and glass. He then continued seriously as a painter of fine art traveling throughout Europe. He took up weaving in Greece and printing in Venice and returning to Philadelphia in 1961 he presented graphics on silk in print for international fashion designers and became a full-fledged fashion designer showing in New York in 1966 and in Paris in 1968. He created the Print Explosion internationally in the haute couture during the 1960s and became what the international press regarded the New Christian Dior in fashion design.

Luksus began his career in fashion in 1960 in Athens & Venice 1961 in Philadelphia. He operated his own textile wool weaving mill and silk printing production and design studio in Bennington, Vermont, and a couture/ready to wear house: TZAIMS LUKSUS at 550 Seventh Avenue in New York City. In the mid-1970s, he left fashion and fabric design and manufacturing to return to fine arts. He presented a collection of oils on canvas and paper to the American Academy at Rome for a Prix de Rome in 1981 that was published in folios in 1991 by the Vermont Foundation of the Arts: Theaum Press. In 1986 he created TZ.L International Ltd and became a perfume artist, launching his Parfumerie Luxus creating MAN ALIVE and IMMORTELLE under the TZ.L label.

His fabric/fashion work and paintings are in the permanent collections of the Metropolitan Museum of Art, Chicago Art Institute, Smithsonian Cooper-Hewitt National Design Museum, the Wadsworth Atheneum, St. Edmund Hall, Musée des Tissus, and other major museums and private collections throughout the world including the Los Angeles County Museum of Art. Among his written works is a play, The Polymachaeroplagidies (1980), and biographic novel, Striking With The Sword of Heaven (1981), a photographic book, The Prince of Prints: The Memoires & Artistry of Tzaims Luksus, FRSA, and the operas Pericles & Xerxes, Zanoni, La Fenice, and Jiullietta di Stromboli.

He was on the faculty of the Haystack Mountain School of Crafts, lecturer and consultant at the Fashion Institute of Technology and lecturer at Pratt Institute, Parson School of Design, and universities around the US. He founded the Vermont Foundation of the Arts (1989), the Vermont Academy of the Fine Arts (1989), the Vermont Academy of Music (1995), the Bennington Opera House (1995), the Bennington Council on the Arts (1989), Palm Beach Baroque Opera, Inc., Palm Beach Bel Canto Opera, and Key West Foundation of the Arts, of which he is also the president and executive director.

== Recognition ==
Luksus won both the Neiman Marcus and Coty awards in 1965. He was elected by council to the Royal Society of Arts as a Life Fellow in 1974 for achievement in promoting arts throughout the world and encouraging manufactures and commerce internationally. He is listed in Who's Who in America, Volume 35:1968-1969 through the 39th Edition-1976:1977 and Who's Who in the World, Fifth Edition: 1980–1981.

Luksus's home in Old Bennington, Vermont, contains an historic George Stevens & Co pipe organ made in 1842.
