= Sydney Wragge =

American fashion designer

Sydney Wragge (1908–1978) was an American fashion designer active during the 1940s, 1950s and 1960s. Working as B.H. Wragge, he was particularly renowned for his American sportswear, with the historian Caroline Rennolds Milbank declaring him the leader in mix-and-match separates and interchangeable wardrobe design.

== History ==
In the 1930s and 1940s, Wragge, along with John Weitz, was one of the few male "pioneers" in the female-dominated world of early American sportswear design. The fashion journalist Sally Kirkland, looking over the development of American sportswear, compared Wragge's design ethos to that of a later designer, Ralph Lauren, declaring that they shared impeccable taste and an eye for the best possible fabrics and prints. He was known for his versatile work, offering jackets that worked with both full and narrow skirts, and two-piece dresses that worked equally well as interchangeable blouses and skirts. In the 1960s, he updated his work to successfully meet the demands of the next generation for even more practical, pared-down clothing. When curating his major exhibition of American sportswear for the Metropolitan Museum of Art in 1998, Richard Martin noted that many of Wragge's former customers still retained the capsule wardrobes they had originally bought in the 1940s and 1950s.

Wragge won his first Coty Award in 1952, a special award for "concept of dressing," and was awarded a second one in 1957. He also received the Neiman Marcus Fashion Award in 1961.

He was the first president of the Council of Fashion Designers of America, a trade association of prominent American fashion and accessory designers that was founded in 1962 by Eleanor Lambert, and held the post until 1965.
