= Barbra Walz =

American fashion photographer

Barbra Walz (née Turner; 1950/1951 – June 18, 1990) was an American fashion photographer. Her photos of clothes and of designers themselves appeared on covers and in the pages of publications like the New York Times Magazine, GQ, Parade, Rolling Stone, and Town & Country.

== Early life ==
She was born in 1950 or 1951 to Stanley and Pauline Turner. As a teenager, she was diagnosed with cancer which led to the loss of one of her legs. She studied fashion and photography at the Pratt Institute in New York, and was inspired at a lecture at NYU by photographer Jill Krementz, where she talked about her work taking pictures of authors.

== Career ==
Walz photographed clothing, but became particularly well known for fashion photography of fashion designers. Her work appeared on covers and in the pages of publications like the New York Times Magazine, GQ, Parade, Rolling Stone, and Town & Country. Her portraits attempted to provide a glimpse into their lives, with settings in a variety of both everyday and exotic settings.

She published her first book, The Fashion Makers, in 1978, treating designers as celebrities at a time when they were first entering popular culture. Accompanying her photos is text by New York Times fashion reporter Bernadine Morris, who interviewed the subjects. Eleanor Lambert wrote about "fashion's first family album" for the Field Newspaper Syndicate, saying "there has never been a better job of blowing away the mists and dissolving the clichés about such style deities as Diane von Furstenberg, Bill Blass, Ralph Lauren, Calvin Klein and Oscar de la Renta than the young American photographer's marvelously penetrating studies of fifty famous designers."

Her second book, Starring Mothers, was published in 1987, focusing on famous mothers and their kids. According to the New York Times, "it was considered one of the best photographic books of the year and was included in a group show by the International Center of Photography." As with her first book, she worked with a writer to provide profiles of her subjects, which included Carly Simon, Anna Fisher, Amy Irving, and Debbie Allen.

== Personal life ==
Walz met her husband, interior designer Kevin Walz, at Pratt. A New York Times Magazine article detailed their shared work and living space in a former factory in downtown Manhattan. They had two daughters together. She died of breast cancer on June 18, 1990, at the age of 39.
