= Zoran (designer) =

American fashion designer (born 1947)

- Born: Zoran Ladicorbic; 1947 (age 78–79); Serbia, Yugoslavia
- Label: Zoran
- Awards: Coty Award, 1982

Zoran Ladicorbic (born 1947), known as Zoran, is an American fashion designer who launched his business in 1976. He is particularly known for extremely minimalist, understated garments following the American sportswear principle, in neutral colors (occasionally red, purple or blue) and high quality natural fabrics such as silk, linen and cashmere wool. His clothes have been described as "Gap for the very rich", and as "revolutionary" due to being designed without "built-in obsolescence".

== Early life ==
Born in the Banat in 1947, Zoran trained as an architect before migrating to the United States in 1972 where he worked in clothing retail and as an accessory designer for Scott Barrie before launching his label. In 1983, Zoran stated that he considered himself an American.

== Fashion ==
Zoran's first collection, produced in 1976, offered five simple, one-size-fits-all designs made in white or black crepe-de-chine; all he could afford at the time. This collection, named "Five Easy Pieces", was sold through Henri Bendel, where it sold out quickly, leading to increasingly larger orders. In 1982, Zoran offered some of his garments in cotton knit for summer, which enabled a wider range of customers to afford them, and also produced velour resort wear which could be worn both on the beach and for formal occasions.

Zoran received his first Coty Award nomination in 1980, but did not win until 1982, when he was awarded a Special Award for menswear separates. He was also shortlisted for the Coty in 1983, but declined his nomination.

By 1983 Zoran's name had become a byword for clothing that reflected his minimalist purity of line. He was based in Greenwich Village, rather than in the Seventh Avenue, the focus of New York's garment industry. Also in 1983, with the exception of Barneys, Zoran pulled his clothes from sale through the major American stores, and opened his first shop in Washington D.C. Whilst also selling clothes through the London boutique Browns, he also chose to focus on private clients such as Queen Noor of Jordan, Isabella Rossellini and Lauren Hutton. By 1999, he was again selling through department stores such as Saks Fifth Avenue.

In 1993, Zoran described his approach to fashion as "simplicity in fabric and way of cut. You cannot produce complicated clothes or spend 10 days making a dress. Mine is all done by scaling measurements. I use the body as the land, as when building a house." Suzy Menkes described his work at the time as based on loose and easy fits, playing only with proportion, color and texture, such as lining chiffon with lamé, or pairing velvet with alpaca.

Although his clothes were extremely expensive and the designer refused to allow them to be reduced in price, they consistently sold well. In 1999, The New York Times noted that wholesale revenues of Zoran were probably around the $25 million mark; with profit margins equivalent to those of Armani. Philip B. Miller, the then chairman of Saks, declared that Zoran was ranked "at the very top".

While regularly referred to as "reclusive and recalcitrant", and as someone maintaining a "low profile", Zoran is noted for his strong opinions. In 1983, he declared that the only jewelry a woman should wear with his clothing should be her children or her husband. In the same interview, when asked what designers he admired, alongside Coco Chanel, he declared Chairman Mao Zedong's wife, Jiang Qing "the ultimate designer, the designer of the century", for having helped create the uniform worn by a billion Chinese. In 1993, he told Menkes, "Clothes should never touch the body," declaring that only prostitutes wore tight clothing. Zoran's clients have recalled being advised not to wear make-up or painted toenails with his clothing, with Gloria Vanderbilt describing how when the designer saw her wearing an Armani suit at a book reading, he promptly covered her outfit with one of his own chiffon stoles.

Zoran relied on the loyalty of his customer base and the high quality of his deliberately logo-free clothing for his success, notably avoiding publicity, advertising, and licensing deals under his name. He rarely held fashion shows. In the early 2000s he withdrew from traditional retail and since 2014, is believed to work on a private basis for individual clients.
