= Sylvia Pedlar =

American fashion designer specialising in lingerie

- Born: June 1, 1900; New York
- Died: February 26, 1972 (aged 71); New York
- Label: Iris Lingerie
- Awards: Coty Award (1951; 1964), Neiman Marcus Fashion Award (1960).

Sylvia Pedlar (1900–1972) was an American fashion designer specialising in lingerie. She is the only designer to have won the Special Coty Award more than once, in 1951 and 1964.

Born Sylvia Schlang in 1900 in New York, she was an art student at Cooper Union and the Art Students League of New York before marrying William A. Pedlar. In 1929 she launched her own business, Iris Lingerie, which she headed through to its closure in 1970.

For her success Pedlar relied on the high quality of her product rather than employing salesmen or purchasing advertising. She is credited with creating super-short babydoll nighties in the early 1940s as a response to fabric shortages during World War II, although she hated the term "baby doll" and refused to use it. One of her most famous innovations was the easily removable toga-inspired négligée specially designed for women who slept in the nude. She used the toga theme throughout her career, with one négligée prominently featured in 1962 by both Life and Harper's Bazaar. She also reworked Victorian styles such as the traditional modest flannel Mother Hubbard nightgown, which she produced in sheer flowing cotton, and reproduced nineteenth-century whitework embroidery by machine to such a high standard that her work rivalled luxurious handmade French lingerie. Examples of Pedlar lingerie are held by the Costume Institute, and archival material dating from 1946-1967 is held by the Fashion Institute of Technology.

Pedlar died in New York on the February 26, 1972.
