= Salvatore J. Cesarani =

American fashion designer

- Born: September 25, 1939 (age 85); New York City
- Awards: Coty Award for Menswear- 1974, 1975, 1976

Sal Cesarani is an American fashion designer particularly known for his tailored menswear, which has made him a triple-Coty Award winner.

== Early life and education ==
Sal Cesarani was born Salvatore J. Cesarani on September 25, 1939, New York City, to Vincenzo and Carmela Cesarani.

He is a graduate of the High School of Fashion Industries and the State University of New York. Between 1959 and 1961 he studied design at the Fashion Institute of Technology, New York.

He married Nancy Staluppi on September 29, 1962. They have two children.

== Career ==
Cesarani started out in 1961 as a junior designer for Bobby Brooks, a women's sportswear company, and as a window dresser for Paul Stuart's menswear store. Between 1970 and 1972, he was a merchandising director for Polo Ralph Lauren. He began designing under the label Country Britches from 1973–1975, and briefly designed for Stanley Blacker before founding his New York based fashion label, Cesarani Ltd in 1976. It started as a menswear brand, with womenswear introduced the following year. The Cesarani brand was relaunched in 1993.

Cesarani menswear is noted for its styling and adventurousness, drawing inspiration from sports clothing, classic 1930s and 1940s slouchy tailoring, and the style of Cary Grant and Gary Cooper. He deliberately avoids the mundane, favoring unexpected touches such as peaked lapels on single-breasted jackets or tartan evening blazers. His work has been described as Anglo-American, combining the quality of British tailoring with American sensibility.

He designed the uniforms for the Olympic torch-bearers and ceremonial officials at the 1980 Winter Olympics. He also created a strip for the short-lived soccer team Philadelphia Fury. In 1980, he dressed Lucie Arnaz in the TV film The Mating Season.

In addition to his ongoing design work, Sal Cesarani is a faculty member at the Parsons The New School for Design, where he teaches fashion design and the theory of fabric selection. He is also a member of the Council of Fashion Designers of America.

== Awards ==
Sal Cesarani's menswear won him two Special Coty Awards for Menswear in 1974 and 1975 before winning the main Menswear Award in 1976. In 1982, he was awarded the Coty Menswear Return Award. He has also won the Fashion Group Award of Boston (1977).
