= Donald Brooks =

American fashion designer (1928–2005)

- Born: Donald Marc Blumberg; January 9, 1928; New Haven, Connecticut
- Died: August 1, 2005 (aged 77); Stony Brook University Hospital; Stony Brook, New York
- Education: Syracuse University; Yale University

Donald Brooks (January 9, 1928 – August 1, 2005) was an American fashion designer and creator of the "American Look" founded in the 1950s and 1960s. He had an immense passion for stage and film, designing well over 3500 costumes. His efforts were recognized with an Emmy Award and numerous other honors; he was also nominated three times for the Academy Award and once for a Tony.

== Biography ==
He was born as Donald Marc Blumberg in New Haven, Connecticut, on January 9, 1928. Brooks attended Syracuse University, where he began studying art. He then attended the Yale University School of Drama, where he first decided to become a costume and clothing designer. He studied design at the Fashion Institute of Technology and then the Parsons School of Design in New York. Brooks' first job in the fashion industry was as a window designer for department store Lord & Taylor. The former vice president of Lord & Taylor, Gerald Blum (his life partner with whom he lived at 969 Park Avenue in NYC) described Brooks: "As an American Designer, he never relied on Paris, Milan or that kind of thing, as many designers do,". The window designs brought a lot of attention to Brooks. This would him the job position of taking over Claire McCardell's place of designing Townley Frocks in 1958. He attracted the attention of Dorothy Shaver, the store's president, who hired him to design a clothing line that year.

By the 1960s, Brooks was a preeminent figure in American fashion, cited by The New York Times as one of "the three B's of fashion" alongside Bill Blass and Geoffrey Beene. In 1962, Brooks became one of the founders of the Council of Fashion Designers of America. This endorsed Brooks' popularity, in a matter of a decade he was able to win three Coty Awards made for Broadway and Hollywood. This was the beginning spark for Brooks' career in the costume design world. He opened his first store in 1963.

In addition to his work on Seventh Avenue, Mr. Brooks also designed the costumes for numerous Broadway plays. The 1963 production of "No Strings" which starred Diahann Carroll, incorporated some of Brooks' designs which rewarded him with the New York Drama Critics' Award. Brooks was nominated for three Academy Awards for his pieces in "the Cardinal" of 1963, "Star" of 1968, and "Darling Lili" of 1970. He worked under his own label from 1965 to 1973. Throughout this time, he designed sweaters for Jane Irwill, shoes for Newton Elkin, furs for Coopchik-Forrest and many designs for different department stores.

In 1971, he explored the field of drapery fabrics and bed linens and created designs for the well-known department store, Burlington. His success in theatrical designs continued through this time. In 1982 Brooks won an Emmy for his pieces in the TV show "The Letter" which starred Lee Remick. His awards include The New York Drama Critics Award, a Tony nomination, and the Emmy Award. He was also the recipient of three Coty Awards for fashion and the Parsons' Medal of Distinction.

Towards the end of his career, Brooks' designs were placed in the 2003 Parsons exhibit. The galleries showed a range of his designs, one being his evening wear.

He died on August 1, 2005, at Stony Brook University Hospital in Stony Brook, New York.
