= Mr. John =

American milliner

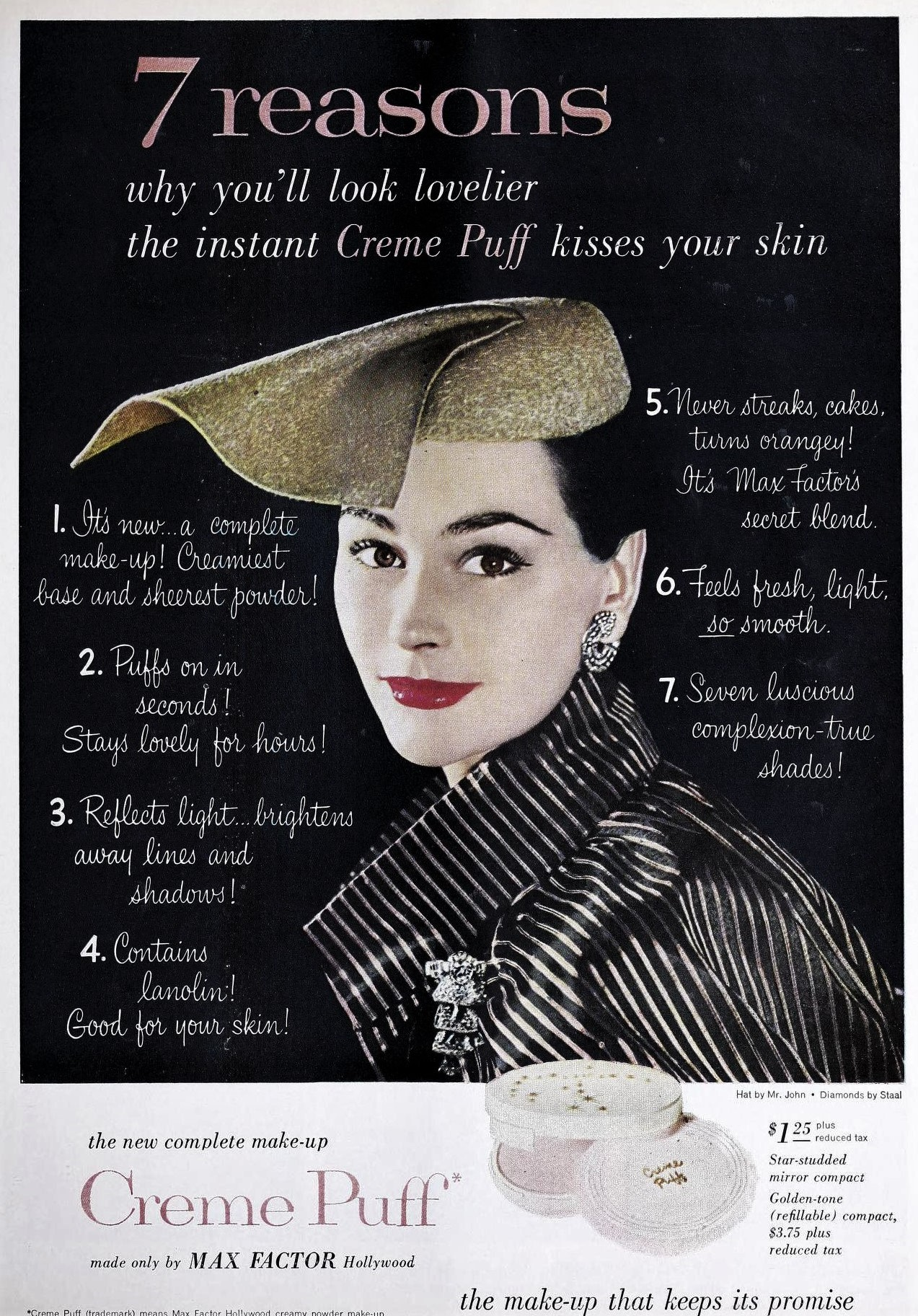
1954 advertisement, (with Max Factor)

John P. John (March 14, 1902 – June 25, 1993) was an American milliner. According to the New York Times, "in the 1940s and 1950s, the name Mr. John was as famous in the world of hats as Christian Dior was in the realm of haute couture".

Born John Pico Harberger in Munich, Germany, Mr. John studied medicine at University of Lucerne, and art at the Sorbonne. Mr. John immigrated to the United States in 1919. He apprenticed to his mother, Madame Laurel, as a dressmaker, before forming a partnership with Frederick Hirst, as milliners known as John-Frederics, in 1929. He started his own millinery company, Mr. John, Inc., in New York in 1948.

Mr. John Inc's most famous work was for Vivien Leigh in Gone With The Wind. African American designer Mildred Blount, who worked for the company, was uncredited at the time for her work on the 19th century-style hats. After a long association with Hollywood and Broadway, demand for Mr. John hats grew exponentially.

A famous anecdote about Mr. John goes that a woman came into his shop in urgent need of a hat. He built one up right on her head, but she balked when he named his price. He then disassembled the pieces and handed them to her. "That's $3.59," he said, "You make it."

Mr. John was an early licensor of his name & image. He partnered for that purpose in 1953 with Louis Blum of Kent Jewelry for Men as a licensee for Men's Costume Jewelry.

Mr. John was a humble man and attributed all of his success to Mary Pickford.

In 1993 Mr. John died at 91 in his Manhattan apartment.

== See also ==
- Milliner
