= Jane Derby =

American fashion designer

Jane Derby (born Jeanette Fleming Barr; May 17, 1895 – August 7, 1965) was an American fashion designer.

== Biography ==
Jeanette Fleming Barr was born in Rocky Mount, Virginia in 1895. She first worked as an apprentice designer before opening her own business in 1936 in New York. She later opened Jane Derby, Inc., in 1938, which she ran continuously until her death in 1965 (with the exception of during World War II). She was one of the first fashion designers to show the short dinner dress. In 1951 she received the Winnie award of the Coty American Fashion Critics' Awards.

She was married to Arthur Lawrence Derby from 1915 until his death in 1961, and in December 1964 remarried to Ross Cuthbert (1892-1970), a former Olympic ice hockey player and retired lieutenant colonel of the British Army. Derby had children, including a son, Arthur (1916-1944), who was killed in action in World War II.

Derby died in Bermuda in August 1965, aged 70. Oscar de la Renta then took control of her company, having worked there before her death.
