= Adele Simpson =

American fashion designer (1903–1995)

- Born: Adele Smithline; December 8, 1903; New York City, New York, U.S.
- Died: August 23, 1995 (aged 91); Greenwich, Connecticut
- Occupation: Fashion designer

Adele Simpson (December 8, 1903 – August 23, 1995) was an American fashion designer with a successful career that spanned nearly five decades, as well as a child performer in vaudeville who danced in productions with Milton Berle and other entertainers.

== Design career ==
Born Adele Smithline, she was the fifth daughter born to Latvian immigrants. At 21 she completed her design curriculum at the Pratt Institute. Simpson took the place of her older sister, Anna, as head designer for Ben Gershel, which was a prominent 7th Avenue ready-to-wear fashion house. Some years later she began work for Mary Lee, a business also based on 7th Avenue which she bought in 1949 and renamed Adele Simpson Inc. She introduced her medium-priced line of clothing in New York the same year. Like many other American fashion designers who worked within a manufacturing context in New York's Garment District, earlier in her career Simpson adapted French couture and presented it with an American ready-to-wear translation.

=== Prominence ===
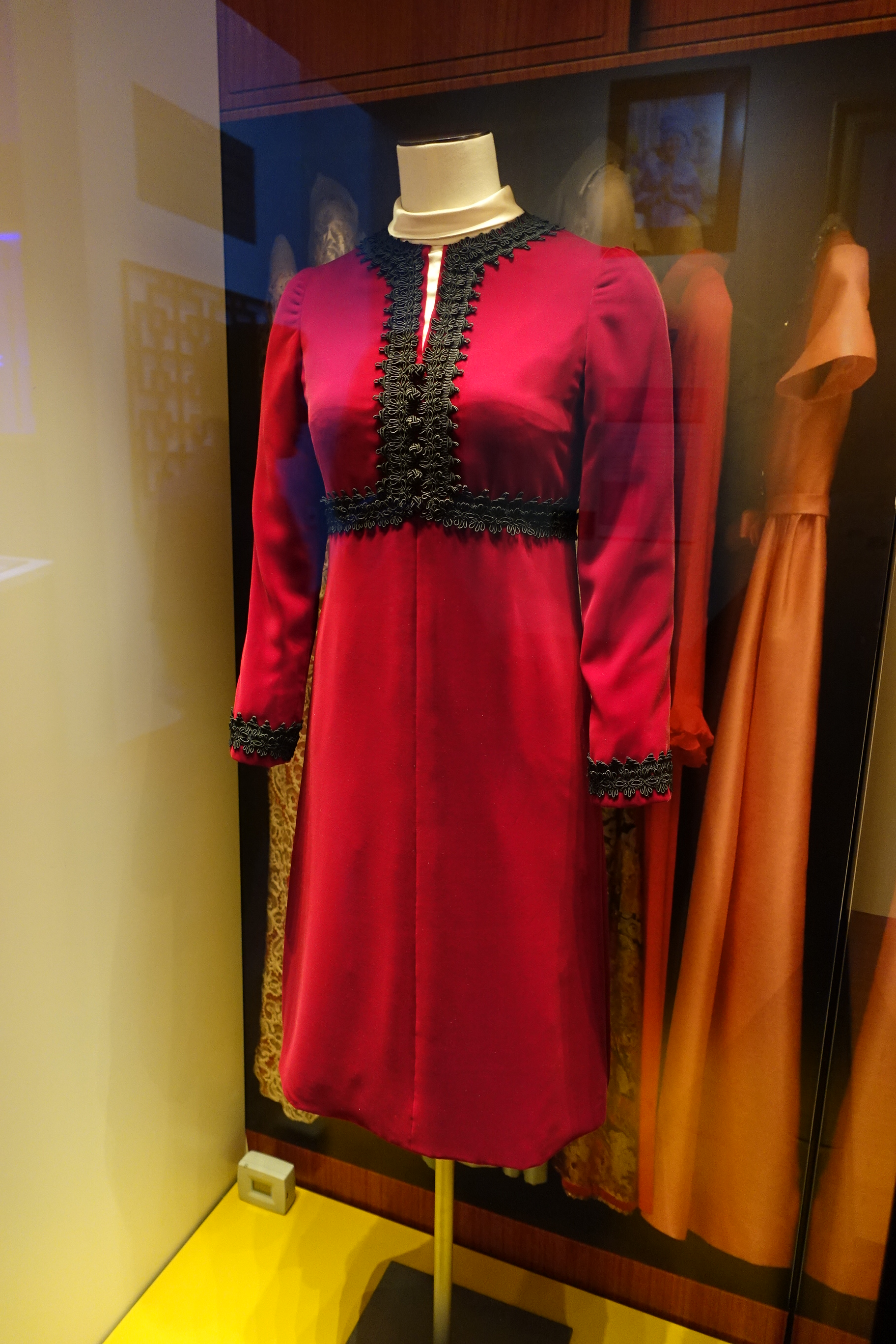
Pat Nixon's China banquet dress designed by Adele Simpson, worn on February 21, 1972 during the President's historic visit to the People's Republic of China, Richard Nixon Presidential Library and Museum

Simpson received many commendations and awards for her fashion designs, including the 1946 Neiman Marcus Award for Distinguished Service in the Field of Fashion, the 1947 Coty American Fashion Critics Award, and the American Academy of Achievements Award. She was also recognized as the inaugural winner of the Cotton Council's Cotton Fashion Award for innovative use of cotton in cocktail dresses, essentially "bringing cotton out of the kitchen." As her career developed, Simpson was frequently recognized for this innovative use of fabrics in her designs.

Her collections were highly visible in the United States, highlighted in both department stores and in the media. For example, her designs were available at Bonwit Teller, B. Altman, and Saks Fifth Avenue. The March 3, 1947 Life Magazine has pictures of Simpson's crocus suit. The spring attire was constructed of sheer wool crepe. The cuffs of the jacket are made of linen and its buttons are high and snug. It has a petal-white collar. A September 22, 1947, Life magazine featured an article entitled "Newest styles give every woman's figure a chance". These fall fashions included an Adele Simpson green satin afternoon dress with a dropped shoulder line for $50, and a gold brocade dress with an off-the-shoulder neckline, which retailed for $79.

Lady Bird Johnson, Pat Nixon, and Barbara Bush also wore Simpson-designed clothing during their time as First Ladies. Simpson designed a wrinkle-resistant yellow street-length coat and matching dress and hat for Lady Bird Johnson for the August 1966 wedding of her daughter, Luci Johnson. Pat Nixon's 1973 inaugural gown - a turquoise blue silk organza and silver silk lame princess-line dress - was also designed by Simpson.

=== Design Inspiration ===
Simpson often travelled internationally and drew inspiration from the fashions and material culture of other cultures. She collected fabrics, trimmings, accessories, and toys, all of which inspired her designs. For example, sari fabrics were incorporated in a collection she showed in the New York World's Fair, and Simpson's 1970 fall collection featured Japanese-styled, high-necked, hobble-skirted dresses in Japanese silk prints. Her work and collections were celebrated in the Fashion Institute of Technology Museum's 1978 exhibition "1001 Treasures of Design," which included objects and clothing from around the world paired with Simpson's own designs. That same year she donated her collection of artifacts, magazines, and costumes to FIT, though she continued designing following that.

=== Later years ===
Simpson continued to design into her 70s before she retired in 1985. Her daughter, Joan Raines, and her son-in-law, Richard Raines, maintained the business prior to selling out to Barron Peters in 1991. Based in Lowell, Massachusetts, the firm chose not to continue the Adele Simpson line. Barron Peters later filed for bankruptcy.

== Death ==
Simpson died at her Greenwich, Connecticut home in 1995. Her husband, Wesley Simpson, a textile executive, died in 1976. Aside from her daughter, Simpson was survived by a son, Jeffrey, also of Manhattan. She had three grandchildren.

== Museum Collections ==
- Texas Fashion Collection, Denton, TX
- Indianapolis Museum of Art, Indianapolis, IN
- FIDM Museum, Los Angeles, CA
