= House dress =

Informal, simple dress

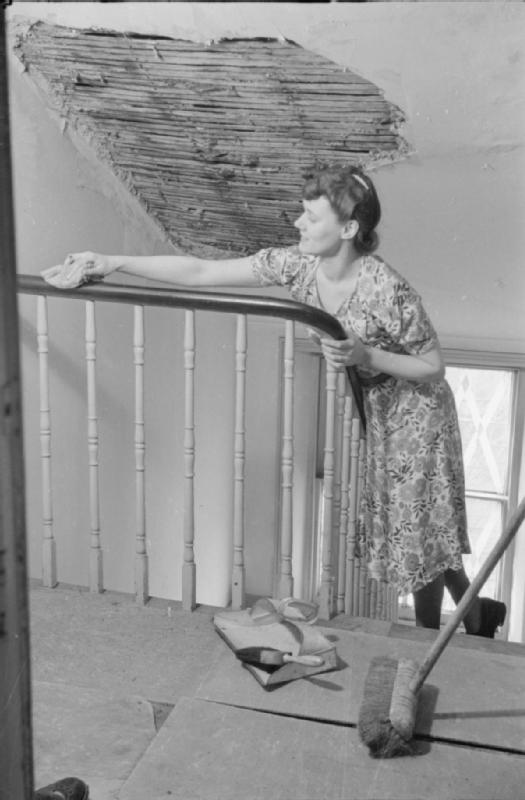
A housewife in London wearing a printed cotton house dress in 1941.

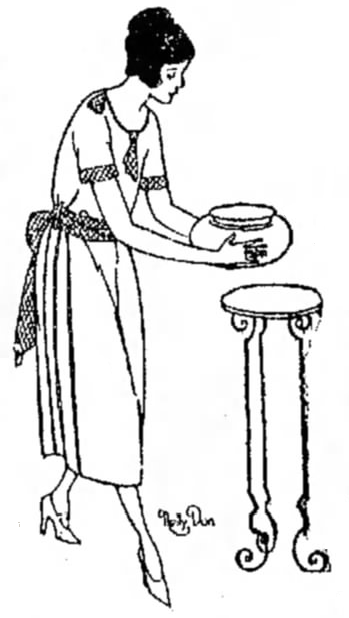
Nelly Don house dress, May 1922

A house dress is a type of simple dress worn informally at home for household chores or for quick errands. The term originated in the late 19th century to describe at-home garments designed for maximum practicality and usually made from washable fabrics. It is directly descended from the Mother Hubbard dress. House dresses are also known as dusters in American and Philippine English, a term which also encompasses the muumuu. Such dresses were a necessary part of the housewife's wardrobe in the early twentieth century and could be widely purchased through mail-order catalogues. The house dress remains a contemporary and frequently worn garment in some parts of the world.

Although an informal garment, the house dress, particularly during the 1950s, was intended to be stylish and feminine as well as serviceable. The concept of attractive house dresses was popularised in the late 1910s by Nell Donnelly Reed, whose "Nelly Don" housedresses (manufactured by The Donnelly Garment Company) established that house dresses could be both attractive and practical. The company, renamed Nelly Don after Reed's retirement, quickly became one of the most successful American clothing manufacturers of the 20th century. Some designers became known for house dress designs, such as Claire McCardell, whose 1942 'popover' wrap dress was equally wearable as a house dress, a dressing-gown, a beach cover-up or even a party dress. The house dress version of McCardell's popover came with a matching oven glove.

Today, house dresses remain in common use in areas where women are frequently full-time homemakers. It may also be used as an informal term for a dress that is mainly worn at home or as a leisure garment.
