= Potholder =

Personal protective equipment

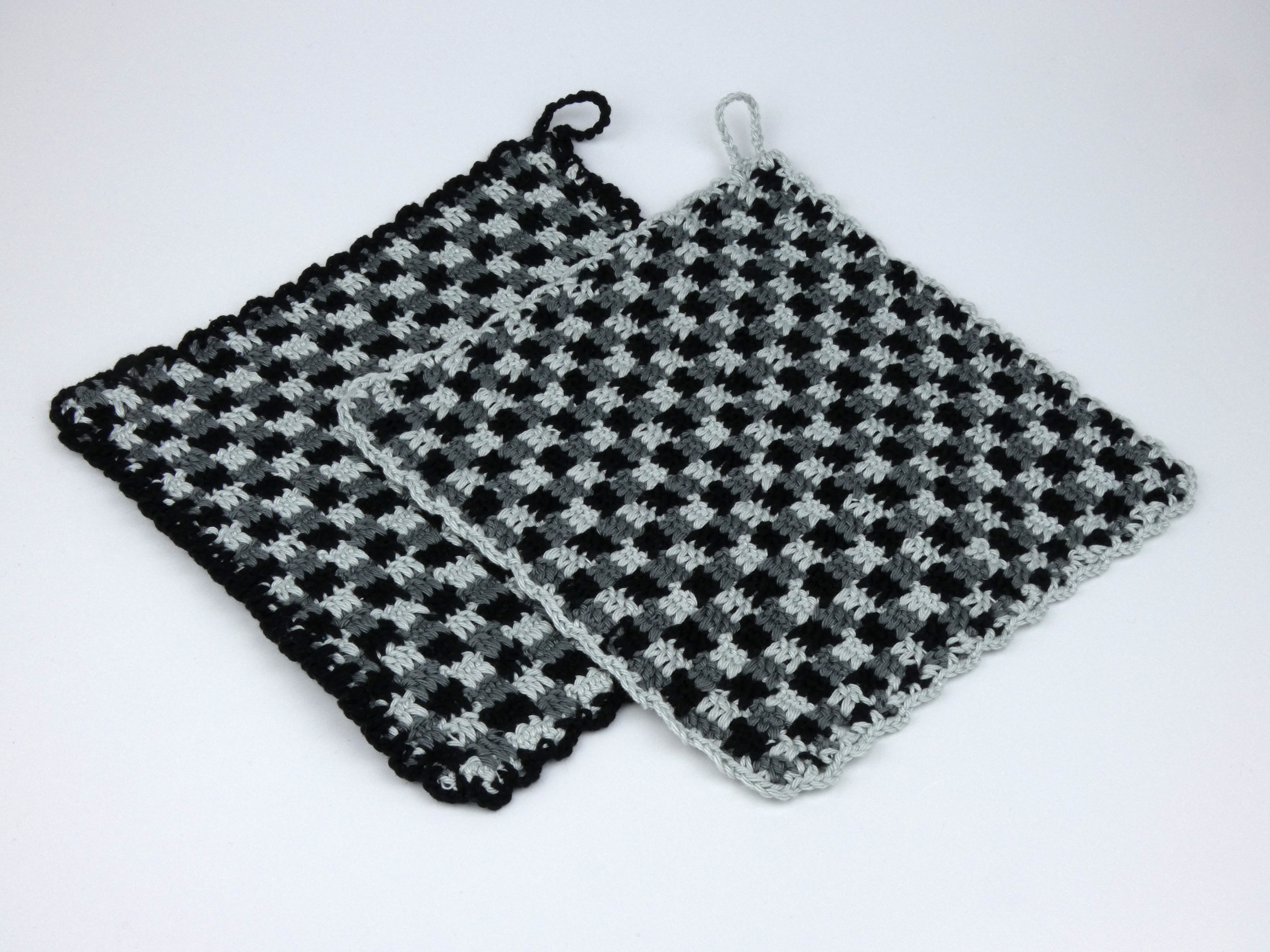
Crocheted potholders

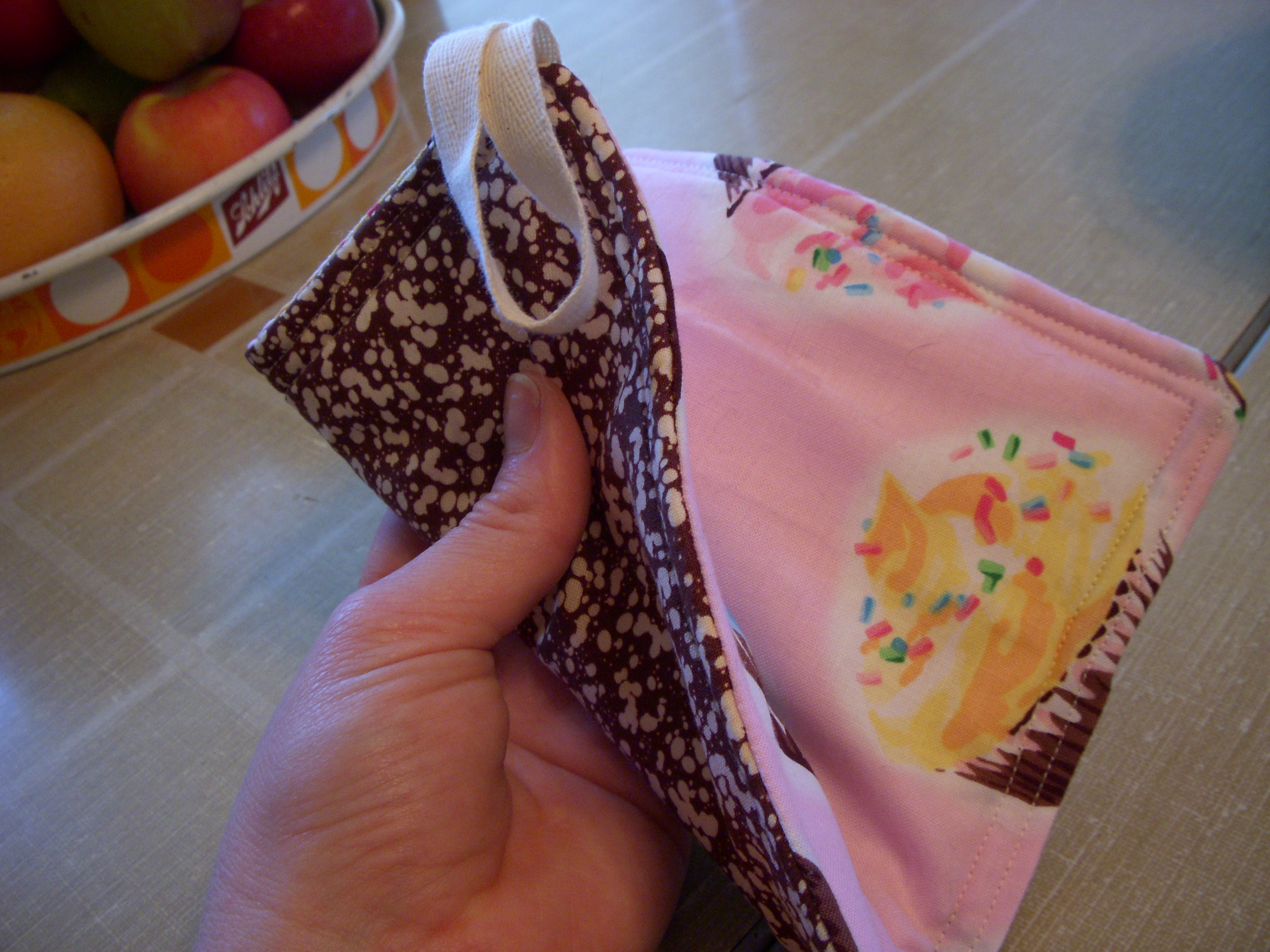
A potholder made from multiple fabrics

A potholder is a piece of textile (often quilted) or silicone used to cover the hand when holding hot kitchen cooking equipment, like pots and pans. They are frequently made of polyester and/or cotton. Crocheted potholders can be made out of cotton yarn as a craft project/folk art.

A potholder offers protection for only one hand at a time. To lift a pan with two hot handles using both hands, two potholders are needed. For holding a hot piece of equipment, the potholder is folded around it and grasped with the hand. Generally a rubber surface will be on one side to grip and a fabric side to absorb the heat on the other side.

When made of textile fabric, potholders typically have an inner layer of a material providing thermal insulation sandwiched between more colorful or decorative outsides. The most common type commercially available nowadays has the form of a square, with a side length varying from 5 inches (13 cm) to 10 inches (25 cm) and slightly rounded corners, and a textile loop at one of the corners for hanging.

== Cultural uses ==
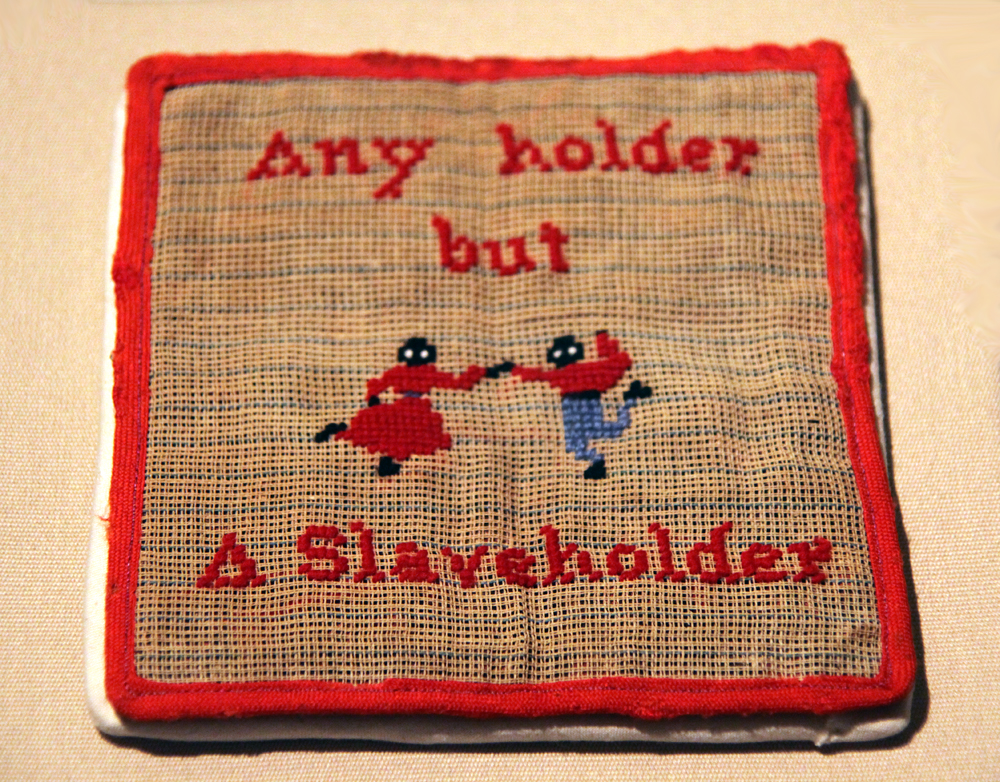
A mid-1800s abolitionist pot-holder, from the Smithsonian Museum of American History

Throughout the potholder's history, it has also been used as a representative symbol of various cultural movements. During the United States Abolitionist Movement, they were displayed by women who wanted to show their support for the Abolitionist cause. These provided women with some way to casually identify as part of the Abolitionist Movement without overtly expressing such. Additionally, it is sometimes used by Cajun cultures as part of their Mardi Gras masks. During the internment of Japanese Americans during World War II, the interred Japanese created several potholders out of various colored fabrics in order to reflect their own culture. This was done to break up the monotony, as the colorful nature of the crafts was in stark contrast to the generally bland surroundings of the camps.

== Style development ==
The earliest records of potholders in the United States stem from the early 1800s, when potholders were made out of lace, as well as crocheted and embroidered. The usage of lace fell away at the same time as the popularization of geometric patterns on potholders, lasting up until the late 1970s. At the same time, applique methods began to become popularly used around the 1960s, and remained the most popular method, alongside of quilting up through the 1970s to the present.

== Materials ==
The textile potholder was nonexistent in art or writing until around the 19th century. Evidence in art points towards hooks that were used to carry hot-handled pots in ancient Greece, but it wasn't until the Antislavery Bazaars of the mid-19th century that equivocally the first home-made potholders were made. These crafts were illustrated with various designs and advertised the phrase 'Any holder but a Slave Holder." By creating such a political craft, which shares similar dimensions and fabrication with the contemporary potholder, women who may have never associated with the abolitionist movement had the opportunity to do so. The popularity of potholders is concomitant with the rise in proliferation of magazines. In these magazines, patterns were given for 'teapot holders' which strongly resemble potholders. Insulation capability was limited in early models. Since their genesis as standard household items, potholders have been largely associated with home crafting, and crocheting has long been the leading method in this strain followed by knitting and patchwork. Needlework patterns in the 1950s were often impractical and over-designed with holes and elaborate spacing that would burn the user or wear out the holder quickly. In the 1970s, quilting and applique-made potholder patterns gained popularity, enduring into the present day.

== Safety ==
Potholders are a form of personal protective equipment. They are used in kitchen settings to protect the kitchen staff from heat related injuries. However, one issue with having pot holders in commercial kitchens is that they are not sanitary. According to Food Service Technology 2.2, research has shown that Potholders are one of the sole culprits of cross contamination in the kitchen. This occurs when someone in the kitchen is working with raw food and then uses a potholder without proper sanitation. When the next person uses the potholder, they are subject to all the germs left behind previously. Another issue with potholders is that the materials that they are made out of are often not water resistant, making them impossible to wash. This poses a problem because kitchens are full of accidental spills, and if a potholder becomes soiled, it can be difficult to clean. If a pot holder becomes wet in any way, it becomes a steam burn risk. Because of these risks, potholders have been banned from commercial kitchens in New Zealand, but there is no sign of this happening in the United States anytime soon.

== Wool ==
Pot holders need to withstand temperatures over 400 °F (200 °C) to protect skin from hot dishes and make a potentially harmful task harmless. A common fabric used for potholders is wool because it can withstand very hot temperatures.

Wool's flame resistance and high ignition temperature make it especially suitable for use as a potholder. Wool is high in sulfur and nitrogen, which promote flame-resistance. Wool can be heated to over 1,000 °F (540 °C) before the igniting of this fabric. Even when the fabric comes in contact with flames it does not disseminate the flame. This provides an even greater protective quality with wool's low flame temperature and the inability for flames to spread throughout the fiber. When wool is heated to a certain degree, it begins to "char" on the outside. This can provide a protective outer layer on the outside fabric. When the char on the outside of the fabric is consistent with the original properties of the wool, it can produce a safer version of the product. When the heat is directly applied to the fabric, the "char" forms a semi-liquid state which can be wiped off the fabric providing no evidence of the heat contact.

== Home production ==
In the early days of "do it yourself" reliance and domestic craftwork, projects like quilting, sewing, knitting, and crocheting were used for both labor and leisure. These activities are commonly used methods to make potholders. Craftwork of this nature has often been associated with women and children as a tradition to be passed down from mother to daughter since before the eighteenth century. By the mid-eighteenth century, it was seen as the woman's duty to decorate and fill their home with these different types of homemaking crafts. Potholders appeared as one of these crafts in the late nineteenth century, usually marketed to accompany kettles and teapots.

Patterns to create potholders at home were first seen in the United States in pamphlets and magazines, including periodicals like Workbasket, whose primary target audience consisted of the middle and working classes. This appearance of needlework patterns in magazines began around 1880 and continued to be prominent through the 1930s. During the Depression Era, designs for potholders were being published by the household press as well as makers of yarns and threads. This period of time is when potholders blossomed into the useful, diverse art form that is recognized by needleworkers today.

Common types of potholder making at home include quilting, knitting, and crocheting. These techniques use different mediums such as yarn or scraps of fabric in order to create potholders of all different colors and patterns. Many "DIY" tutorials teach how to make a simple square potholder, but there are also many that teach a variety of shapes, sizes, and designs, including little houses or flowers. These homemade kitchen tools are often considered good for home decor or gift giving.

== In advertising ==
By the early 20th century, potholders were regularly featured in United States' advertisements. They were featured in magazine and newspaper ads for kitchen appliances, usually providing protection between a woman's hands and her pot or pan of freshly cooked food. The appliance being advertised would often be featured as a backdrop. A typical advertisement would show a young, smiling woman using potholders to remove her freshly cooked bread from the oven. Though the advertisement would usually be for an oven or stove, the potholders are featured as a mainstay in a trendy young woman's kitchen.

== See also ==
- Oven glove
- Mittens
