= Mother Hubbard dress =

Loose-fitting Victorian gown with long sleeves and a high neck

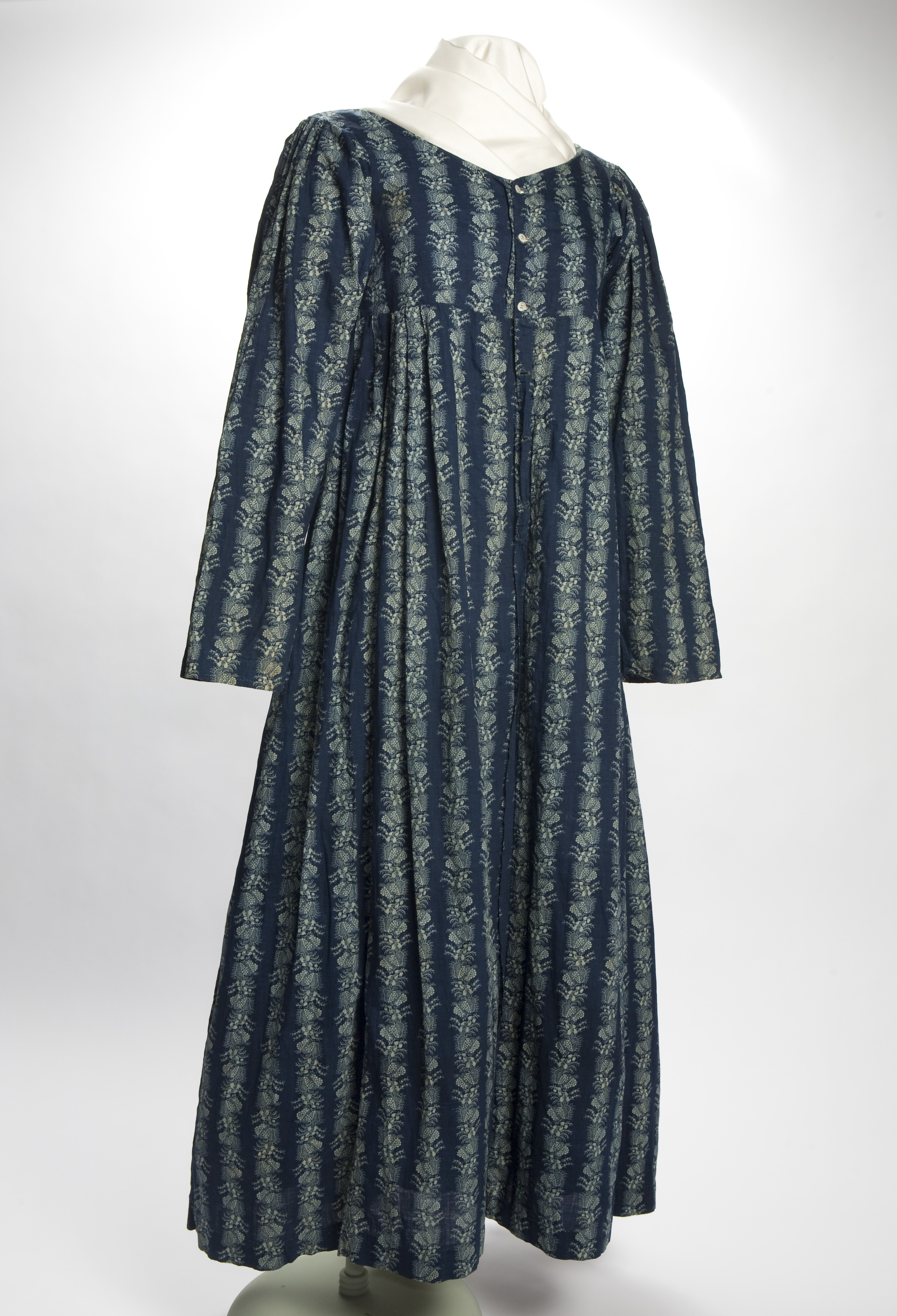
Day dress, American 1820

A Mother Hubbard dress is a long, wide, loose-fitting gown with long sleeves and a high neck. It is intended to cover as much skin as possible. It was devised in Victorian western societies to do housework in. It is mostly known today for its later introduction by Christian missionaries in Polynesia to "civilise" those whom they considered half-naked savages.

Although this Victorian garment has disappeared in most of the world, as a muumuu, it is still worn by Pacific women, who have altered it into a brighter and cooler garment, using cotton fabric, often printed in brightly colored floral patterns. It is today seen as smart or formal attire and is often worn to church.

== History ==
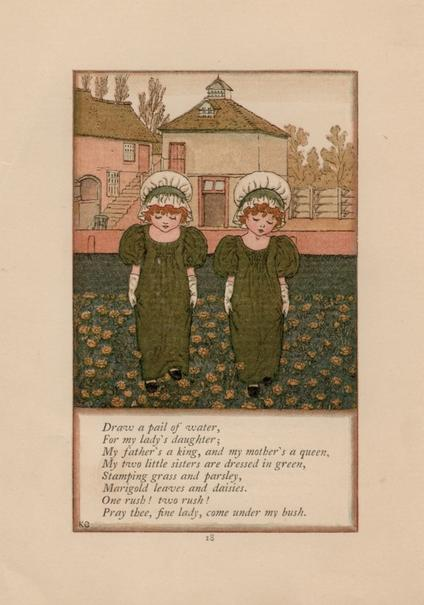
Smocked dresses worn by children in Kate Greenaway's popular books of nursery rhymes. 1881

In the 1880s the artist Kate Greenaway illustrated popular books of English nursery rhymes showing children in smock dresses. These came to be a popular style of children's dress which were given the name 'Mother Hubbard' by fashion writers at the time after the nursery rhyme character in the books.

Around the same time a dress reform movement arose that sought to free western women from the tight and relatively impractical fashion of small, corseted waists and heavy skirts. The smock dress with full length sleeves proved very adaptable to both size and shape and migrated up the age groups until it became comfortable day wear for women of all ages and across social classes.

Contemporary with this in Victorian times Christian missionaries began to spread the gospel to native peoples living in lands controlled by western countries. The Mother Hubbard garments were insisted upon by the missionaries, who were often horrified to find a flock of near-naked people in their churches. They were distributed widely in Africa, South Asia, and the Pacific. They have influenced modern dress in all these areas, but particularly in the Pacific islands where they persist today.

== Pacific island dress ==
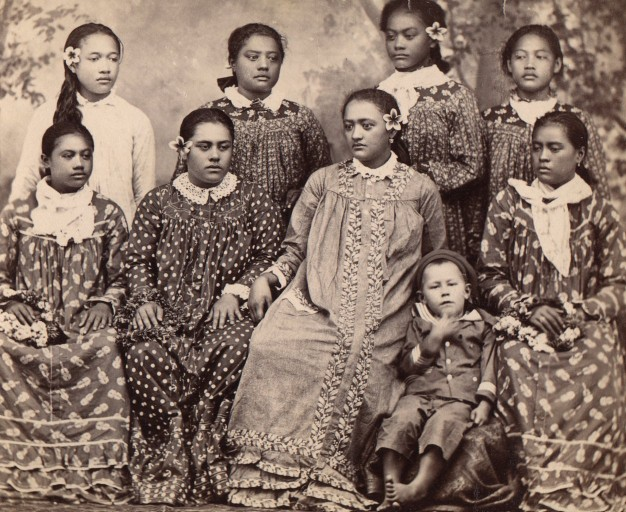
Tahitian girls in their "grandmother's dresses" between 1880 and 1889.

Names and designs vary. In Hawaii, it is called holokū. There, a derivative, the muʻumuʻu, is highly similar, but without the train, and therefore even easier to make. In Tahiti, the name was ʻahu tua (empire dress, in a sense of colonial empire); now, ʻahu māmā rūʻau (grandmother's dress) is used. In Samoa and Tonga, the design has taken on a two-piece form, with classic mother hubbard blouses (long, wide, loose-fitting with puffy sleeves) over ankle-length skirts, called "puletasi" and "puletaha," respectively. In Marshallese, the name is wau ([wɑːu]), from the name of the Hawaiian island of Oahu. The missionaries who introduced it in the Marshall Islands came from Oahu. In New Caledonia, these dresses are referred to as robes missions (Mission Dresses) or robes popinées. New Caledonian women wear these dresses when playing their distinctive style of cricket. In Papua New Guinea, the form of dress is known as meri blaus, which in Tok Pisin means women's blouse. It is considered formal local attire. In the 1960s and 1970s many women in Tarawa, Kiribati and a few i-matang women wore a garment which was referred to as a Mother Hubbard. Whilst the lower half of the body was covered with a wrap-around (lavalava) or a skirt, the top half was worn a very loose low-necked blouse short enough to expose a band of flesh at the waist. The latter was usually worn without underclothes.

== Elsewhere ==
In India and much of South Asia, these dresses are referred to as "Nighties" or "Night-gowns". Indian women wear these dresses for convenience and comfort at home, particularly around only the family members when they are not expecting company. They also usually drape a scarf around the neck for modesty.

== See also ==
- House dress
