= Bernie Sanders mittens meme =

2021 viral Internet meme photograph

Excerpt of the original photograph which later became an Internet meme

The Bernie Sanders mittens meme refers to a photograph of Bernie Sanders, a U.S. senator from Vermont and former presidential candidate, seated during the inauguration of Joe Biden and wearing a face mask and distinctive mittens, which went viral. The photograph became an Internet meme, inspiring altered versions in which Sanders was placed in historical photographs and other humorous contexts. The popularity of the meme resulted in increased visibility for Sanders and demand for the mittens.

== Background ==
When the inauguration of Joe Biden occurred on January 20, 2021 during the COVID-19 pandemic, a photograph of Vermont senator and former presidential candidate Bernie Sanders was taken by Agence France-Presse photographer Brendan Smialowski. It depicts a masked Sanders sitting on a folding chair, spaced apart from other attendees. He is wearing winter clothing, most noticeably a large, fluffy pair of mittens, which were made by Vermont elementary school teacher Jen Ellis. The photograph became a popular Internet meme.

== Memes and merchandise ==
The photograph led to a number of edited and altered versions, in which Sanders was placed into various popular and historical photographs, in a manner similar to that used in the tourist guy meme, including into scenes from Batman, Star Trek and Wayne's World. A website was created to allow the picture of Sanders to be placed into any Google Street View photograph. Subsequently, merchandise was manufactured using the photo; this included plates, T-shirts, stickers, and wine glasses. Sanders responded good-naturedly to the meme and its various derivatives, and he decided to sell sweatshirts featuring the photograph to raise money for charity; the proceeds amounted to at least $1.8 million. In January 2021, IKEA shared the meme in an advertisement featuring their products as a form of reactive marketing.

As a result of the meme, Ellis received thousands of requests for the mittens; although she had stopped regularly making mittens, she took advantage of the publicity to make three pairs to be auctioned for charity and her daughter's college fund. Ellis has collaborated with Darn Tough Socks to produce a range of socks with the same pattern as the mittens, the proceeds of which will go towards food banks in Vermont. Knitting writer Kate Atherley welcomed the interest in mittens resulting from the meme and in an article in The Guardian gave details on how to create a similar pair of mittens. The Burton Snowboards jacket worn by Sanders has also increased its popularity, leading to the company donating 50 of them to the Burlington Department for Children and Families.
