= Wrap dress =

Dress with a front closure formed by wrapping one side across the other

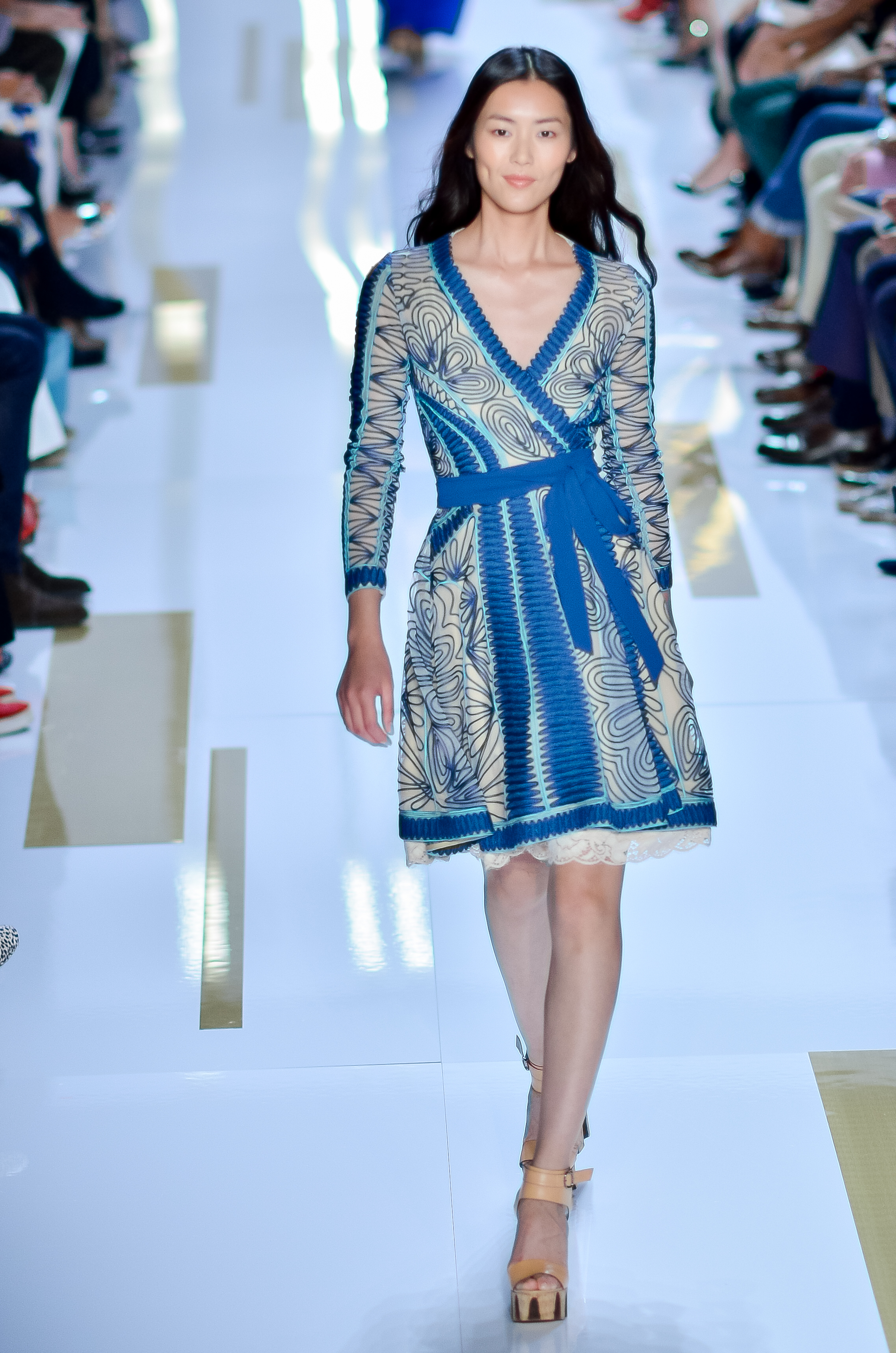
- Type: A garment with wrap over front closure
- Material: Diverse
- Place of origin: Asia, especially influenced by China and Japan
- Introduced: Europe and United States

"Wrap dress" is a generic term for a dress with a front closure formed by wrapping one side across the other, and is fastened at the side or tied at the back. This forms a V-shaped neckline. A faux wrap dress resembles this design, except that it comes already fastened together with no opening in front, but instead is slipped on over the head. A wrap top is a top cut and constructed in the same way as a wrap dress, but without a skirt. The design of wrap-style closure in European garments was the results of the heavy influences of Orientalism which was popular in the 19th century. (Note: Such as British tea gowns of the 19th century)

== History ==
Wrap-over neckline which closes to the right side originated in China and can be traced back to the Shang dynasty (1600 to 1046 B.C) before spreading to other countries (such as Korea and Japan) while wrap-over neckline which closes to the left were basic styles of garments which were widely used in Central Asia and East Asia, as well as Europe, from West Asia.

=== East Asia ===
==== China ====
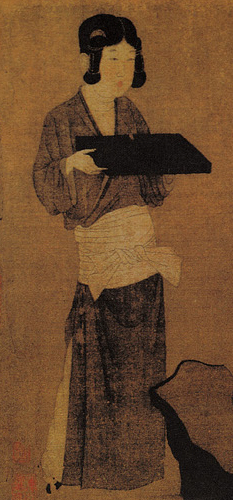
Woman wearing a jiaoling pao with a wide belt enclosing the waist, Tang dynasty

The traditional clothing of the Han Chinese, Hanfu, are traditionally loose, wrap-style garments; these include wrap-style robes, such as the shenyi (which sews a top and a skirt to form a dress), the zhiduo, the daopao, and the jiaoling pao (a one-piece dress), etc., as well as wrap-style upper garments, such as the chang'ao and ru, etc., and as short-sleeved or sleeveless wrap-style upper garment such as banbi and dahu, etc. (Note: See the relevant pages for sources and more detail information; other wrap-style Chinese garments could also include the Banbi) The Chinese wrap-over neckline typically closes on the right side like the alphabetic letter《y》and is referred as jiaoling youren (Chinese: 交领右衽; lit. 'intersecting collar right lapel') but can occasionally close on the left side under some circumstances in a style known as jiaoling zuoren (Chinese: 交领左衽; lit. 'intersecting collar left lapel'). (Note: See the page Garment collars in Hanfu for sources and more detail information)

Quju shenyi tied with a large sash, China, 704–223 B.C.

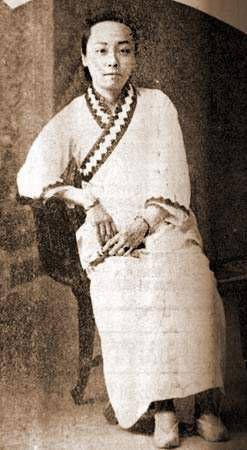
Sai Jinhua in a long-length paofu; a type of hanfu, 1920s

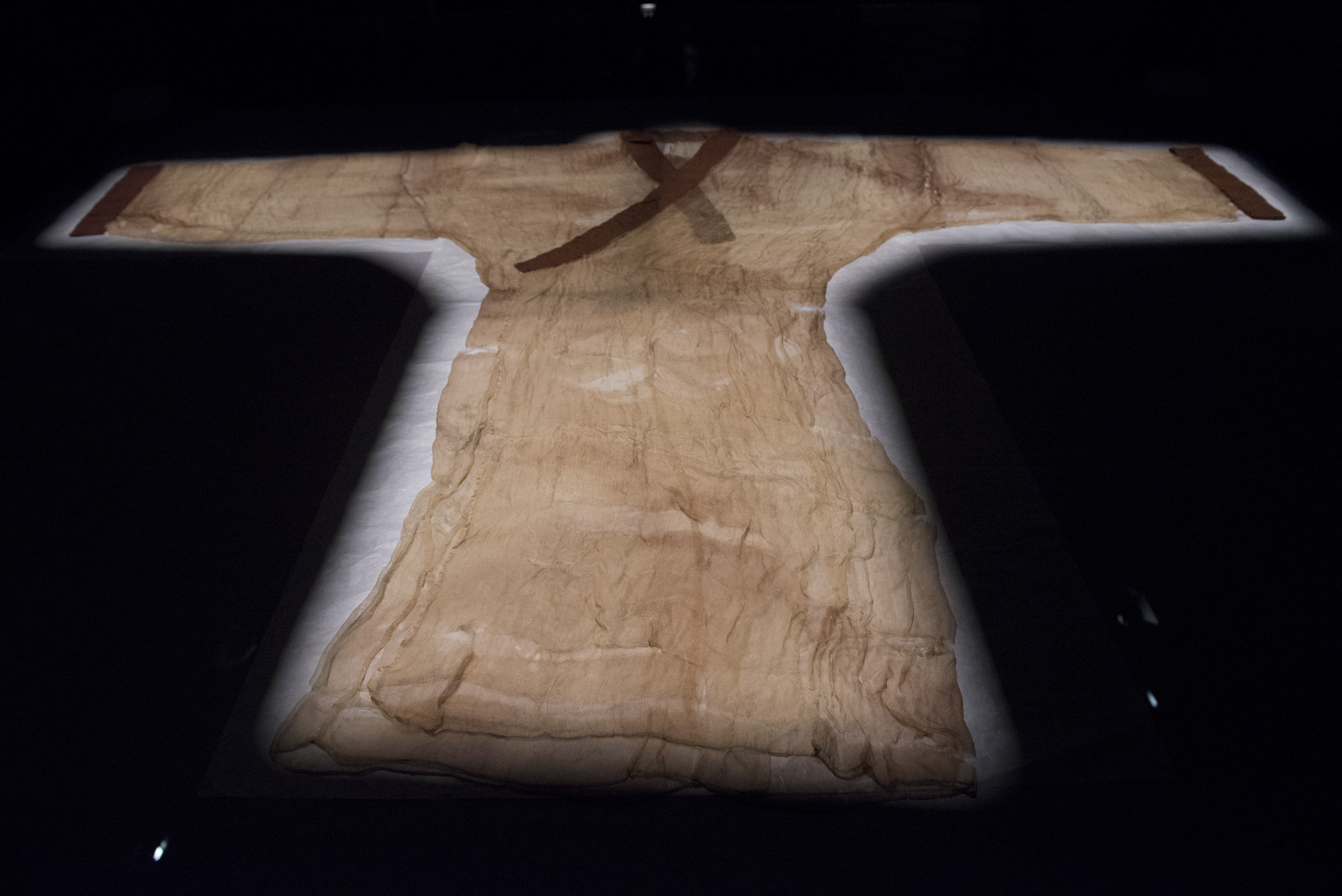
Zhiju shenyi, unearthed from the Mawangdui tomb, Han dynasty

==== Japan ====
The jiaoling youren was adopted by the Japanese in 718 AD through the Yoro Code which stipulated that all robes had to be closed from the left to the right in a typical Chinese way.

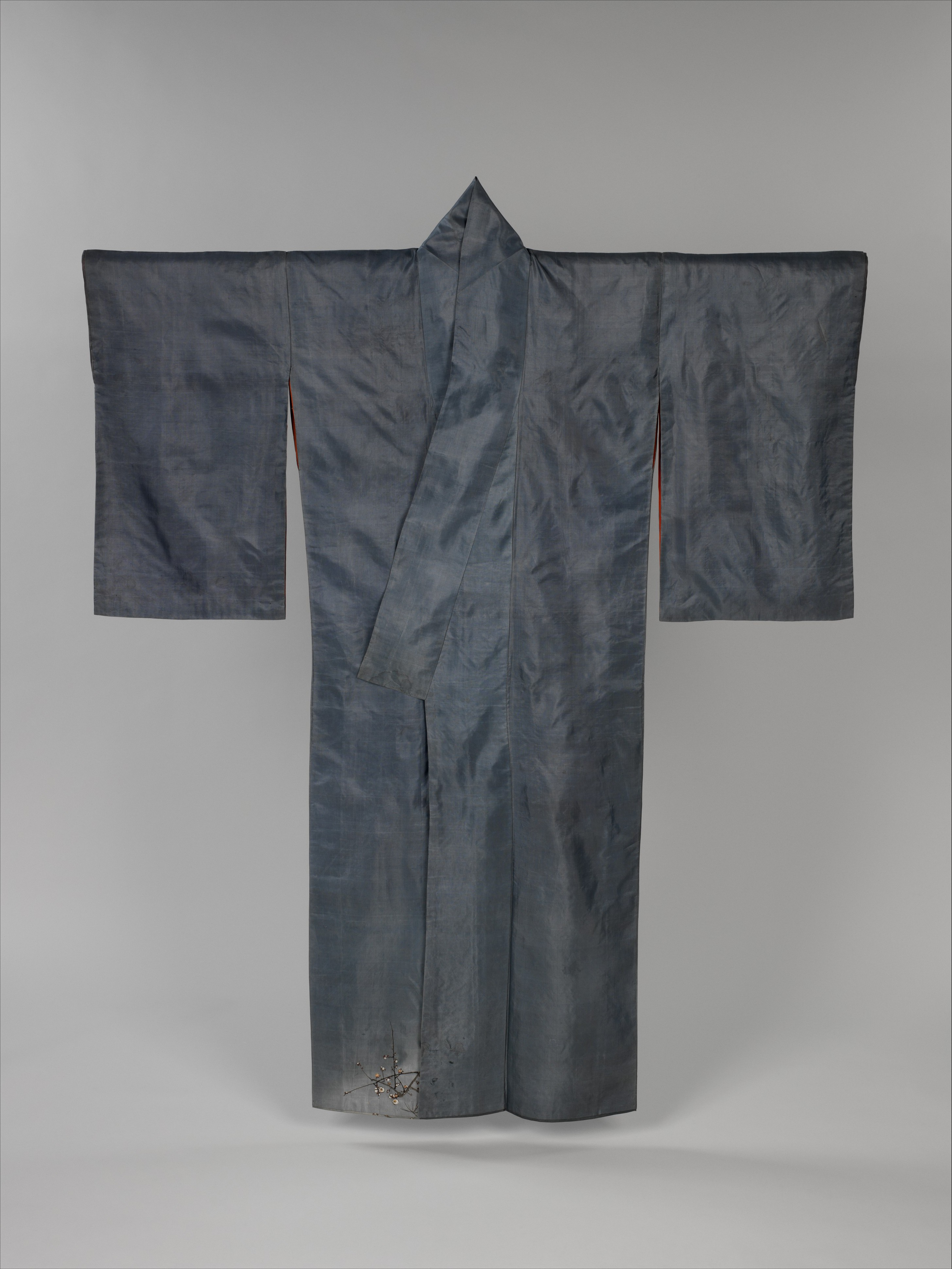
Kimono, second half of 19th century

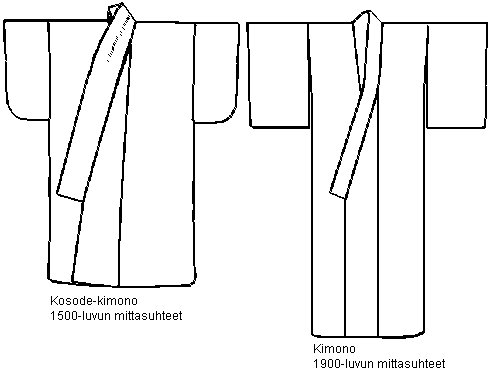
Wrap-design of the Japanese kosode and kimono

Wrap-style garments which were tied with sash have very ancient origins in China and were later introduced in Japan influencing the design of the kimono. The kimono originated from the Chinese jiaoling pao, which gained popularity in the 8th-century Japanese court.

=== Orientalism, Europe, and America ===
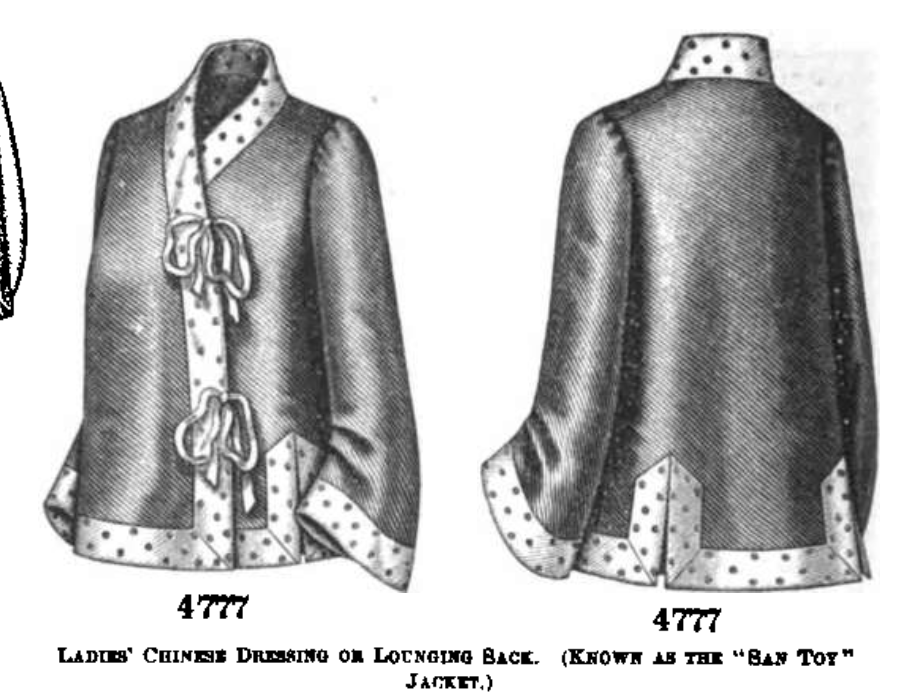
San Toy (#4777), the Ladies' Chinese dressing or lounging sack, a design published in 1901 in The Delineator, Volume 57, p. 210

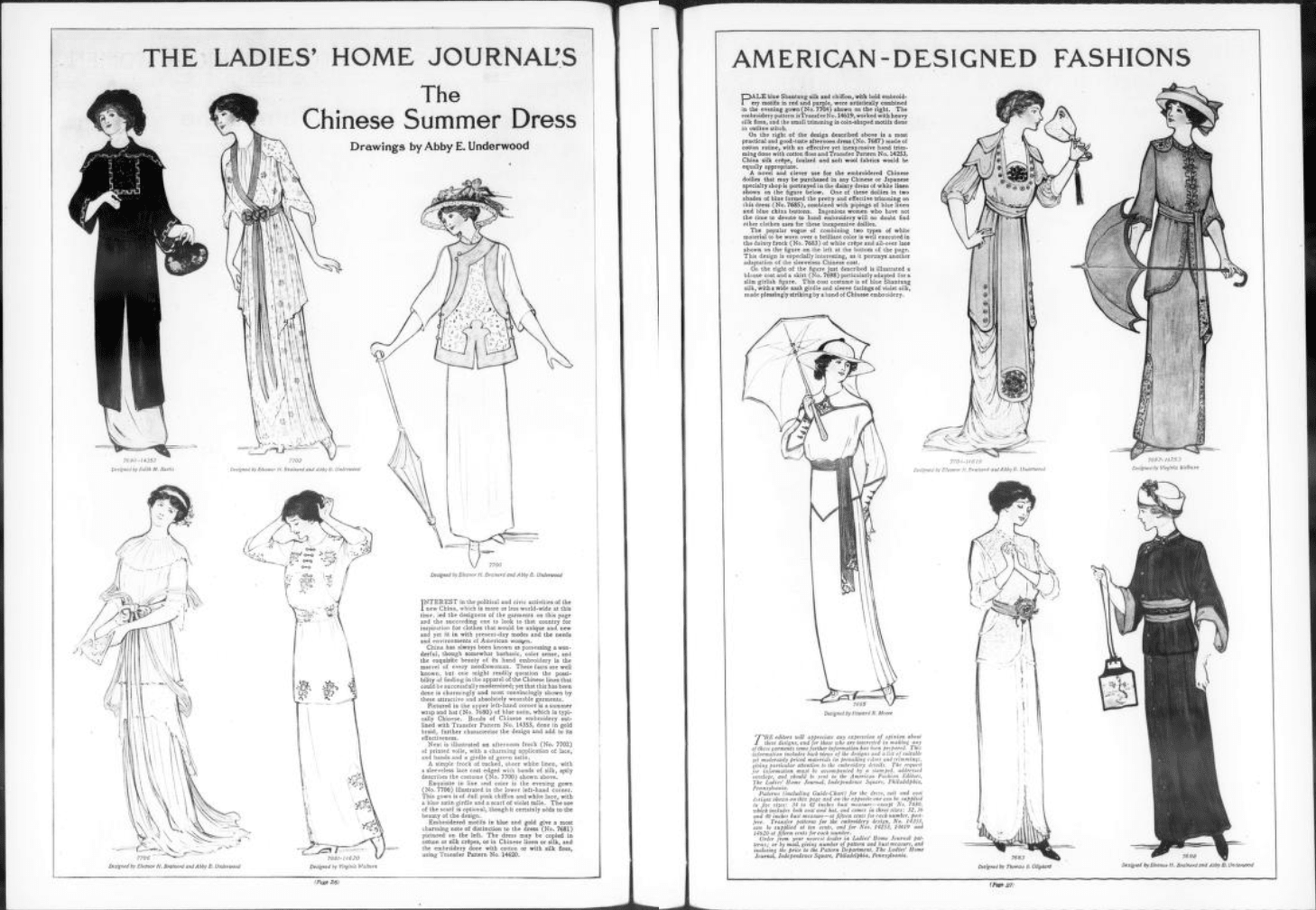
Chinese-style garments, including a wrap-top tied with belt, designed by US designers in 1910s, published from the Chinese Summer dress from Ladies’ Home Journal of June 1913: Vol 30 Issue 6, page 26 and 27

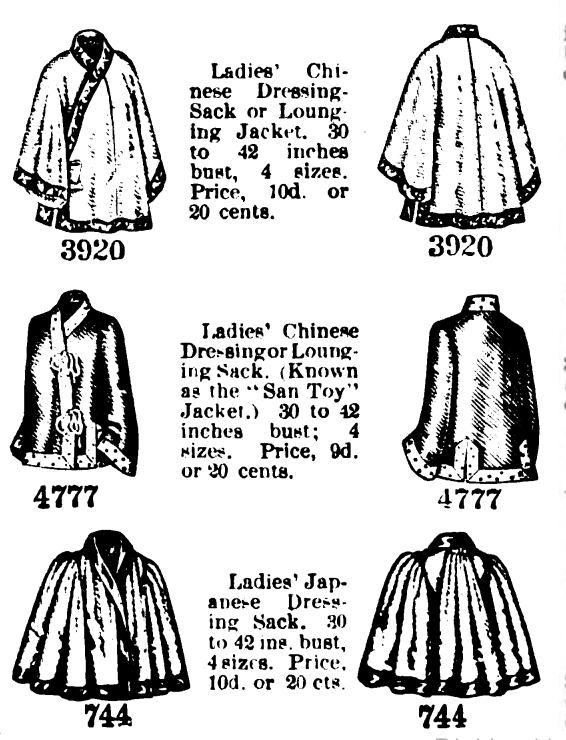
Differences between the wrap closure of Chinese and Japanese inspired wrap-top, early 1900s, images from The Delineator, Volume 58, published in1901.

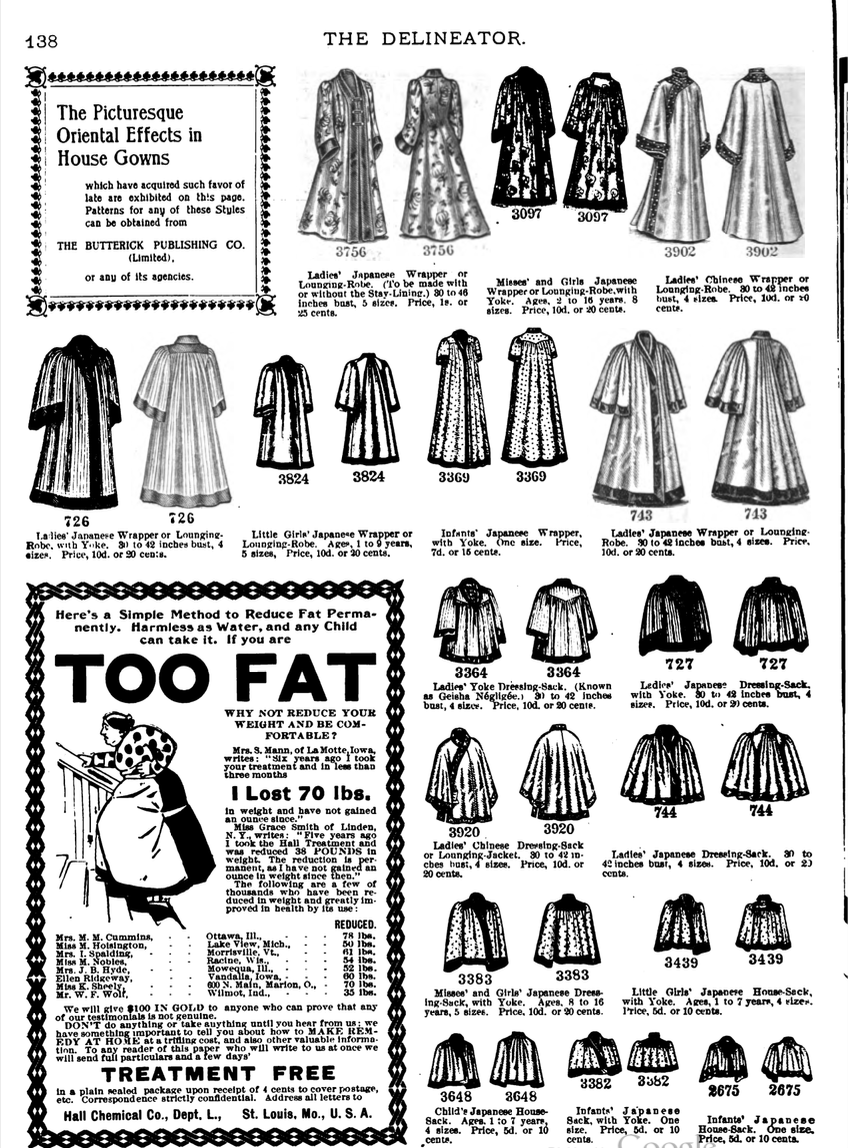
Japanese-style vs Chinese-style wrap-top and wrap-robe in the 1900s, American fashion, from The Delineator, Volume 56, published in 1900

European clothing with wrap-style closure were heavily influenced by the popularity of Orientalism in the 19th century. (Note: Such as British tea gowns of the 19th century) In the 20th century, Chinoiserie in fashion gained popularity and impacted many fashion designers of the time, including fashion designed based in the United States. According to the Ladies’ Home Journal of June 1913, volume 30, issue 6:

Interest in the political and civic activities of the new China, which is more or less world-wide at this time, led the designers of this page [p.26] and the succeeding one [p.27] to look to that country for inspiration for clothes that would be unique and new and yet fit in with present-day modes and the needs and environments of American women [...]

— Ladies’ Home Journal: The Chinese Summer Dress, published in June 1913: Vol 30, issue 6, p. 26

Chinoiserie continued to be popular in the 1920s and was a major influence in the dress feature and fashion design of this period; simultaneously, Japonisme also had a profound impact by influencing new forms of clothing designs of this period; for example, the use of wrap top and obi-like sash as an influence of the Japanese Kimono.

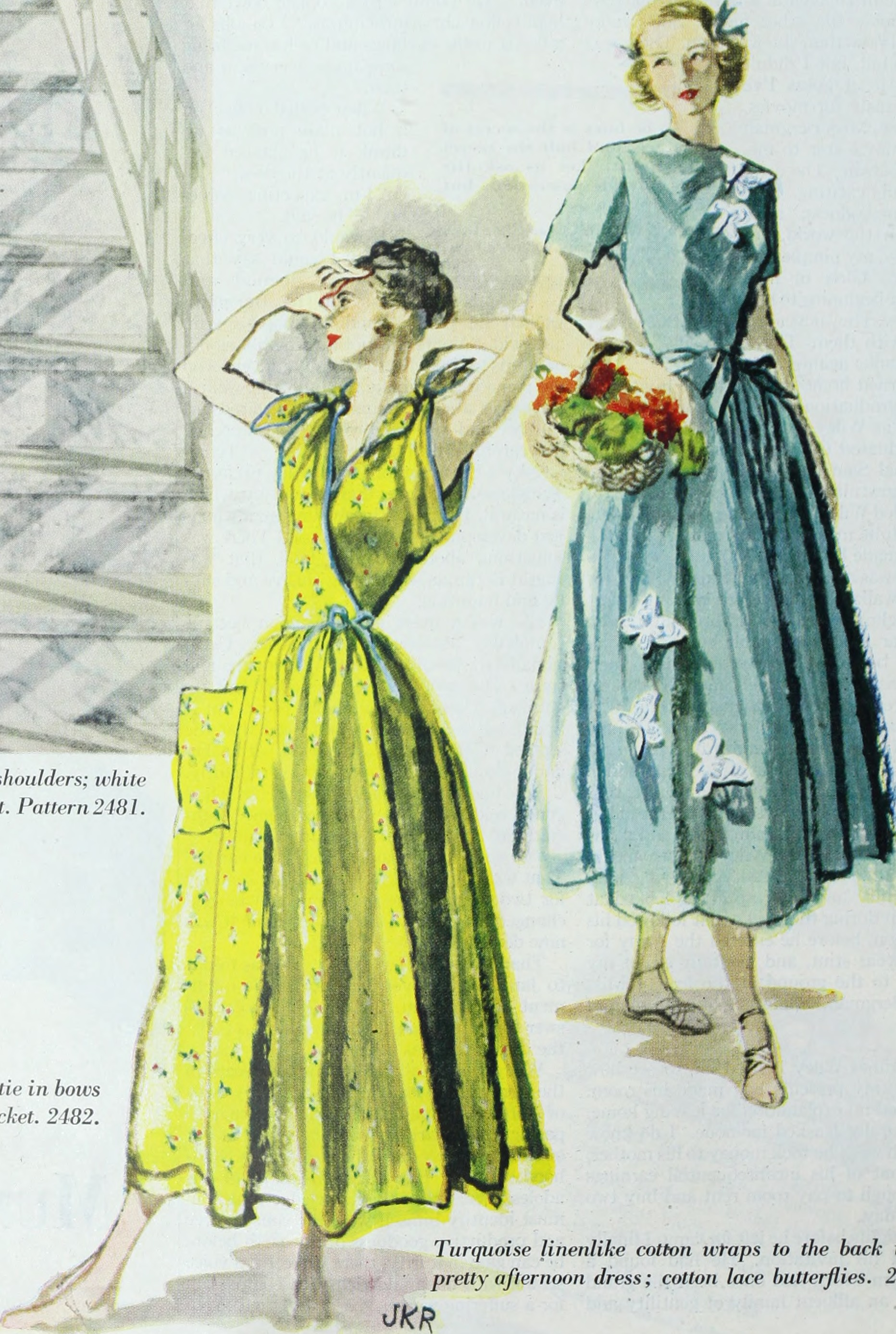
Wrap dress from the Ladies' home journal published in 1948.

During the Great Depression, house dresses called "Hooverettes" were popular which employed a wrap design. Wrap dresses were designed by Elsa Schiaparelli in the 1930s and by Claire McCardell in the 1940s, whose original 'popover' design, which was made out of denim, became the basis for a variety of wrap-around dresses. Fashion designer Charles James also designed a wrap dress.

In the early 1970s, Orientalism re-emerged as the West officially expressed eagerness towards the Far East. Oriental fashion, thus, re-surfaced in American fashion wear; American designers also showed these Oriental influences in their creation designs. The wrap-around lounging wear, which was inspired by the native Chinese dress, gained popularity among women during this period.

=== Diane von Fürstenberg's wrap dress ===
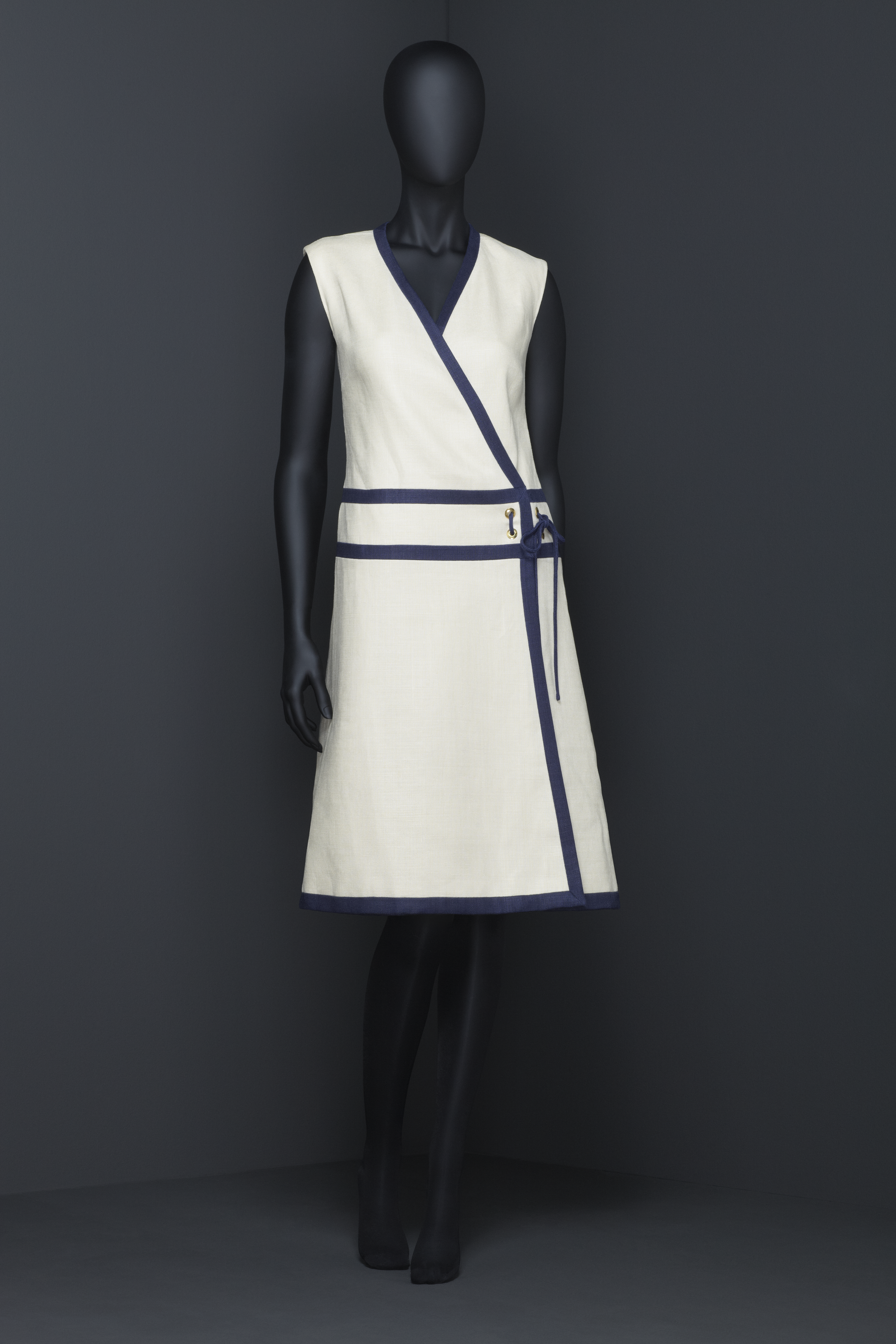
1960s wrap dress: the navy bindings highlight the wrap-over.

Although it is often claimed that Diane von Fürstenberg 'invented' what is known as the wrap dress in 1972/73, Richard Martin, a former curator of the Costume Institute at the Metropolitan Museum of Art, noted that the form of Fürstenberg's design had already been "deeply embedded into the American designer sportswear tradition," with her choice of elastic, synthetic fabrics distinguishing her work from earlier wrap dresses. Her design is actually a two-pieces dress where a wrap top is sewn to a skirt, similar to the making of the Chinese shenyi.

The Fürstenberg interpretation of the wrap dress, which was consistently knee-length, in a clinging jersey, with long sleeves, was so popular and so distinctive that the style has generally become associated with her. She has stated that her divorce inspired the design, and also suggested it was created in the spirit of enabling women to enjoy sexual freedom. The wrap dress that she designed in 1974 was a design re-interpretation of the Kimono.

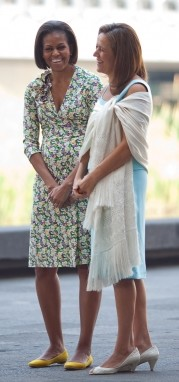
Michelle Obama wearing a Diane von Fürstenberg wrap dress in 2010

However, Fürstenberg acknowledged in 2024 that her notable wrap dress design in fact bore similarities to her previous skirt and wrap top dresses, with her idea of making her notable wrap dress figure developing after she noticed Julie Nixon Eisenhower opted to wear one of her skirt and wrap dresses while defending her father during a televised appearance she made as the Watergate scandal was progressing.

Wrap dresses achieved their peak of popularity in the mid to late 1970s, and the design, essentially a robe, has been credited with becoming a symbol of women's liberation in the 1970s. They experienced renewed popularity beginning in the late 1990s, particularly after von Fürstenberg reintroduced her wrap dress in 1997; she, among others, has continued to design wrap dresses since then. André Leon Talley published a 2004 book dedicated entirely to Fürstenberg's wrap dresses. The popularity of the wrap dress and its perceived feminist significance persisted into the 2010s.

== See also ==
- Robe
- Wrap (clothing)
- Chinoiserie in fashion
- Japonism
