= Reactive marketing =

Marketing technique

Reactive marketing is a marketing technique done in reaction to a particular situation or actions made by a competitor. This type of marketing has been influenced by traditional newsprint advertising, but has also developed due to social media. For successful reactive marketing, brands' marketing teams are constantly social listening to see what's trending on social media or in the news cycle to then act fast with a social medial post with the aim of making it go viral.

== Examples ==
=== Successful examples ===
Some examples of brands practicing reactive marketing include:

- In 2015 after Steve Harvey announced the wrong contestant as the winner of the Miss Universe 2025 contest, Burger King shared a post on Twitter saying "At BK everyone gets to keep their crown", which received nearly 53,000 retweets and 45,000 likes.
- In November 2020 during the COVID-19 pandemic, Burger King shared a post on Twitter "We know, we never thought we'd be saying this either" with an image encouraging customers to order from a number of its rivals, explaining, "restaurants employing thousands of staff really need your support at the moment".
- During UEFA Euro 2020, IKEA Canada created an advertisement for a "Cristiano" bottle that was marketed explicitly for water after Cristiano Ronaldo publicly hid a can of Coca-Cola and urged the public to "drink water".
- In 2020, a TikTok creator Nathan Apodaca created a viral clip of him skateboarding while lip-syncing to Fleetwood Mac’s “Dreams” and sipping from a bottle of Ocean Spray Cran-Raspberry. Ocean Spray reacted by gifting Apodaca his own cranberry red truck to remake the post.
- In January 2021, IKEA shared a photo of the Bernie Sanders mittens meme while featuring their products.
- In April 2021 when England began lifting some of the national lockdown restrictions, in a post on Twitter, Tesco encouraged customers to support their local bar instead of shopping at Tesco.
- In December 2021, Peloton created an advertisement of an alternate storyline of Chris Noth's character in HBO's And Just Like That thirty-six hours after its airing, where instead of Noth's character suffering from exercise-induced heart attack, he run's off with his instructor.

=== Negative examples ===
Sometimes brand using reactive marketing will received negative reactions from customers and audiences, and some examples include:

- On March 29, 2021, Volkswagen released a press release announcing a rebrand of its US operations to Voltswagen of America, but the press release caused confusion, as it was dated for April 29, 2021, and removed from its website before being confirmed to journalists and republished the following day with an amended date of March 30, 2021.

=== Negative into positive examples ===
Some reactive marketing involves brands doing crisis management in times of bad press, but using it as an opportunity to gain support instead of ruining a brand's reputation.

- In April 2021, the food retailer Marks & Spencer had begun legal proceedings for trademark infringement against the supermarket chain Aldi over the similarities between its Cuthbert The Caterpillar cake and Marks & Spencer's Colin The Caterpillar. Aldi's social media team replied with a series of posts and memes, using the hashtag #FreeCuthbert.

== Strategies ==
There are some strategies brands can employ to prepare for reactive marketing:

- Seaonal planning for key dates and events that align with the brand
- Follow trending news stories using tools like Google Alerts
- Brainstorming and quickly validating mpromptu events

The marketing publisher The Drum suggests a checklist to validate reactive marketing ideas:

- Does the approach express key values and messages of the brand?
- Keep it unique
- Check social hashtags for alternative meanings
- Mock up a visual
- Plan out supporting content as a press release, social posts, or comments
- Common sense check from third parties
