= Popover (dress) =

Type of wrap dress designed by Claire McCardell in 1942

Popover is a type of dress originally designed by Claire McCardell in 1942. The outfit type became the basis for a variety of wrap-around dresses. It was created as a response to a Harper's Bazaar challenge to create something fashionable one could wear to clean the house and then, wear to a cocktail party. The simple grey dress came with a matching potholder that fit into the dress pocket. The "Popover Dress" sold for $6.95 and more than 75,000 were sold in the first season alone. These dresses became a staple of McCardell collections and over time, Claire McCardell made versions in different lengths and fabrics. The "Popover Dress" received a citation from the American Fashion Critics Association and in 1943, McCardell won a Coty Award.

A versatile wrap dress, the popover dress could be used as a bathing suit cover-up, house dress, dressing gown, or party dress. It is often considered iconic of the American Look.

== See also ==
- Wrap dress
- American sportswear
- Claire McCardell
