= A. LeRoy McCardell =

American politician (1873–1945)

Member of the Maryland Senate from the Frederick County district
- In office 1927–1930
- Preceded by: Frank C. Norwood
- Succeeded by: Emory L. Coblentz

Personal details
- Born: Adrian LeRoy McCardell; March 12, 1873 Frederick, Maryland, U.S.
- Died: December 9, 1945 (aged 72) Frederick, Maryland, U.S.
- Resting place: Mount Olivet Cemetery
- Party: Democratic
- Spouse: Eleanor M. Clingan (m. 1903)
- Children: 4, including Claire
- Education: Franklin & Marshall College (AB)
- Occupation: Politician; banker

Adrian LeRoy McCardell (March 12, 1873 – December 9, 1945) was an American politician from Maryland. He served as a member of the Maryland Senate, representing Frederick County from 1927 to 1930.

== Early life ==
Adrian LeRoy McCardell was born on March 12, 1873, in Frederick, Maryland, to Alforetta (née Stonebraker) and Adrian C. McCardell. He was educated at Frederick Academy and the Franklin and Marshall Academy. He graduated from Franklin & Marshall College with a Bachelor of Arts in 1893.

== Career ==
In December 1893, McCardell was elected discount clerk at the Frederick County National Bank. In 1923, he was made vice president and trust officer. On March 5, 1924, he succeeded his father as president of the bank.

McCardell was a Democrat. He served as a member of the Maryland Senate, representing Frederick County, from 1927 to 1930. He then was appointed a member of the state tax commission by Governor Albert C. Ritchie in 1931 and served in that role for six years.

McCardell was a member of Frederick's city park commission and was treasurer of the Frederick Playground Commission. He served as its treasurer for around 20 years. He was president of the Frederick Clearing House Association, an organization of local banks.

== Other endeavors ==
McCardell was a member and served as deacon and elder of the Evangelical Reformed Church. He was superintendent of the Sunday school for more than 20 years and later served as superintendent emeritus. A state director of the church, he was associated with the church's Forward Movement campaign. He was treasurer of the Potomac Synod Association and the local church. He was a member of the board of directors of the YMCA and served as its president. He was also a member of the Boy Scout council and was a trustee of the Home for the Aged. He was a member of the board of trustees of the Frederick City Hospital and was a member of the board of the Mutual Insurance Company. He was a treasurer and a member of the executive committee of the Frederick County chapter of the American Red Cross.

McCardell was a member of the Masonic order. He served as master of the Lynch Lodge, No. 163 and was high president of Enoch Chapter No. 23. He was 33rd degree Mason of the Ancient and Accepted Order of the Scottish Rite. He was junior grand warden of the Grand Lodge of Maryland and grand commander of the Grand Commandery of Maryland.

== Personal life ==
McCardell married Eleanor "Ella" M. Clingan, daughter of John Wesley Clingan, of Jackson, Mississippi, on October 7, 1903. They had four children, Claire, A. L. Jr., Robert Clingan and John Malcolm.

McCardell died on December 9, 1945, at his home on Rockwell Terrace in Frederick. He was buried in Mount Olivet Cemetery.
