= Mu'umu'u =

Loose dress of Hawaiian origin

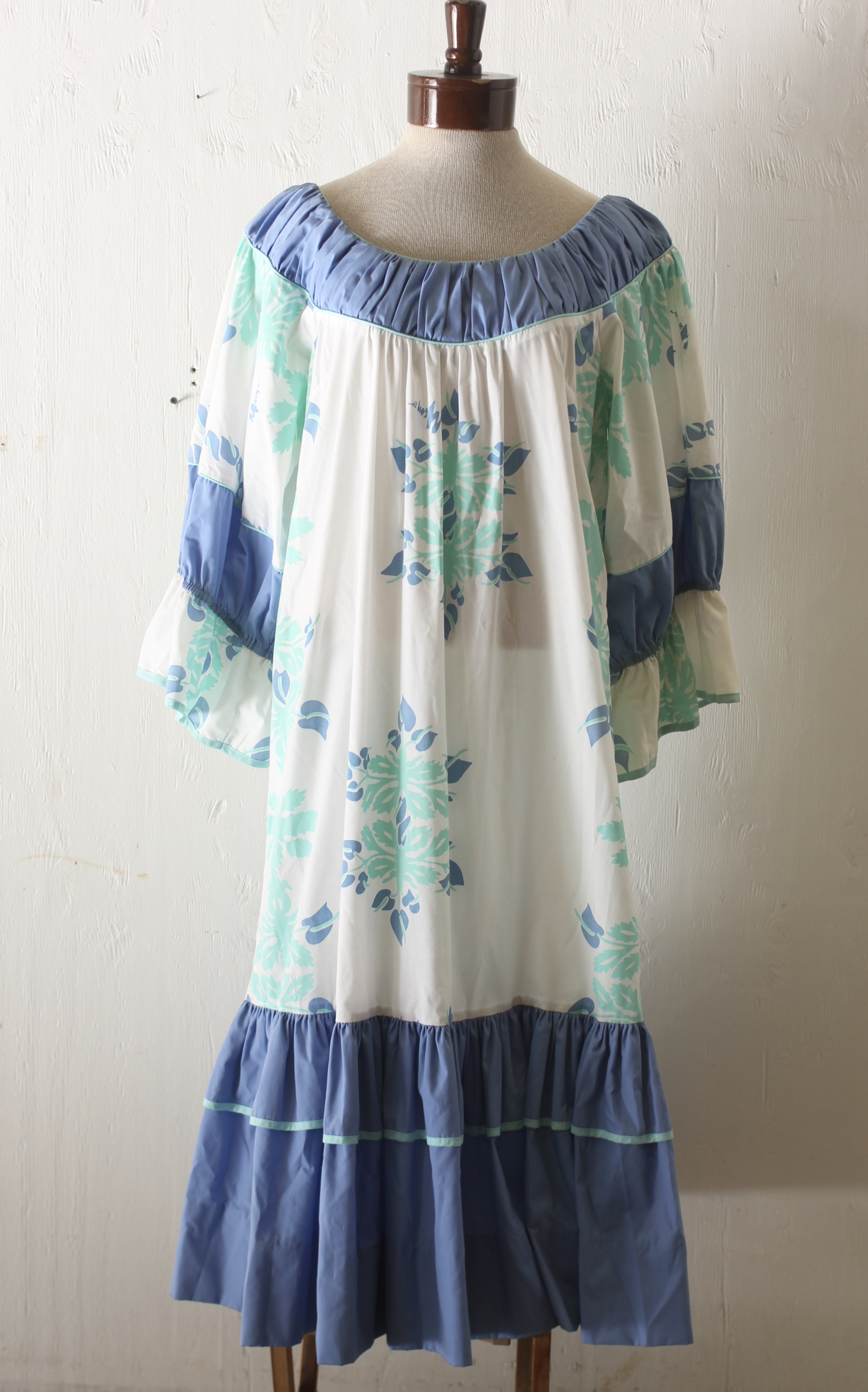
Muʻumuʻu on a dressform.

The muumuu (English: /ˈmuːmuː/ MOO-moo) or muʻumuʻu (Hawaiian: [ˈmuʔuˈmuʔu]) is a loose dress of Hawaiian origin. It is related to the Mother Hubbard dress, introduced by Christian missionaries in Polynesia to "civilize" local people. Within the category of fashion known as aloha wear, the muumuu, like the aloha shirt, are often brilliantly colored with floral patterns of Polynesian motifs. In Hawaiʻi, muumuus are no longer as widely worn as an aloha shirt, but continue to be a popular dress for social gatherings, church, and festivals such as the Merrie Monarch hula competition.

== Etymology and history ==
The word muʻumuʻu means "cut off" in Hawaiian. The dress, which was originally used as an undergarment or chemise for the holokū, lacked a yoke and may have featured short sleeves or no sleeves at all. The muumuu was made of lightweight solid white cotton fabric and, in addition to being an undergarment, served Hawaiian women as a housedress, nightgown, and swimsuit. Holokū was the original name for the Mother Hubbard dress introduced by Protestant missionaries to Hawaii in the 1820s. In contrast to the muumuu, the holokū featured long sleeves and a floor-length unfitted dress falling from a high-necked yoke which was worn by the aliʻi as well as the common people. By the 1870s, the holokū of the aliʻi took on a more fitted waist and often a train seven or eight yards in length for the evening, and included ruffles, flounces and trimmings, while the modest loose-fitting train-less holokū continued to be widely worn by women of all classes as their daily dress. In time, upon the introduction of printed fabrics to Hawai'i, the muumuu, essentially a shortened and more comfortable version of the holokū, gained popularity for everyday wear.
