= Oven glove =

Heat-resistant kitchen glove

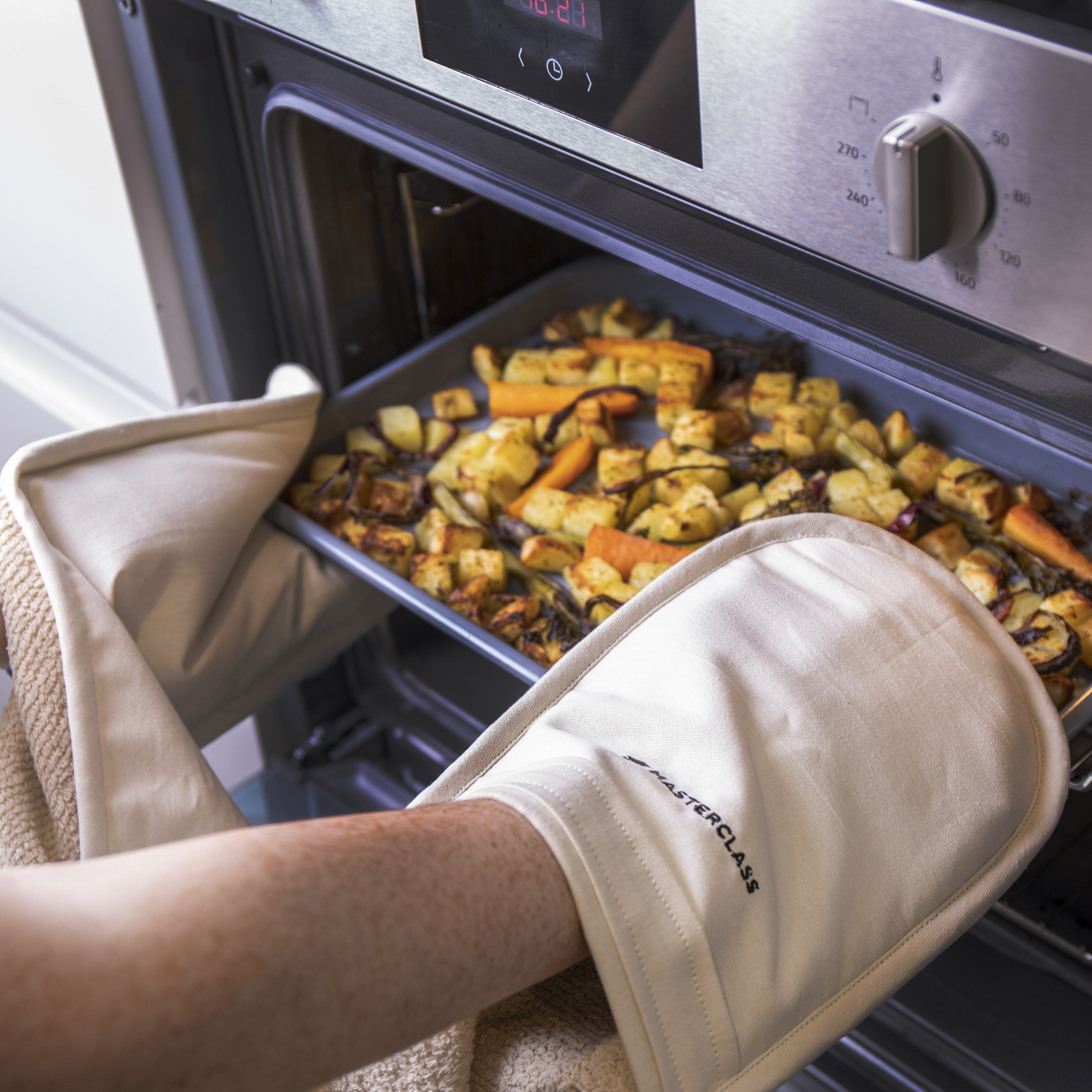
Connected oven mitts being used to remove a hot tray from an oven

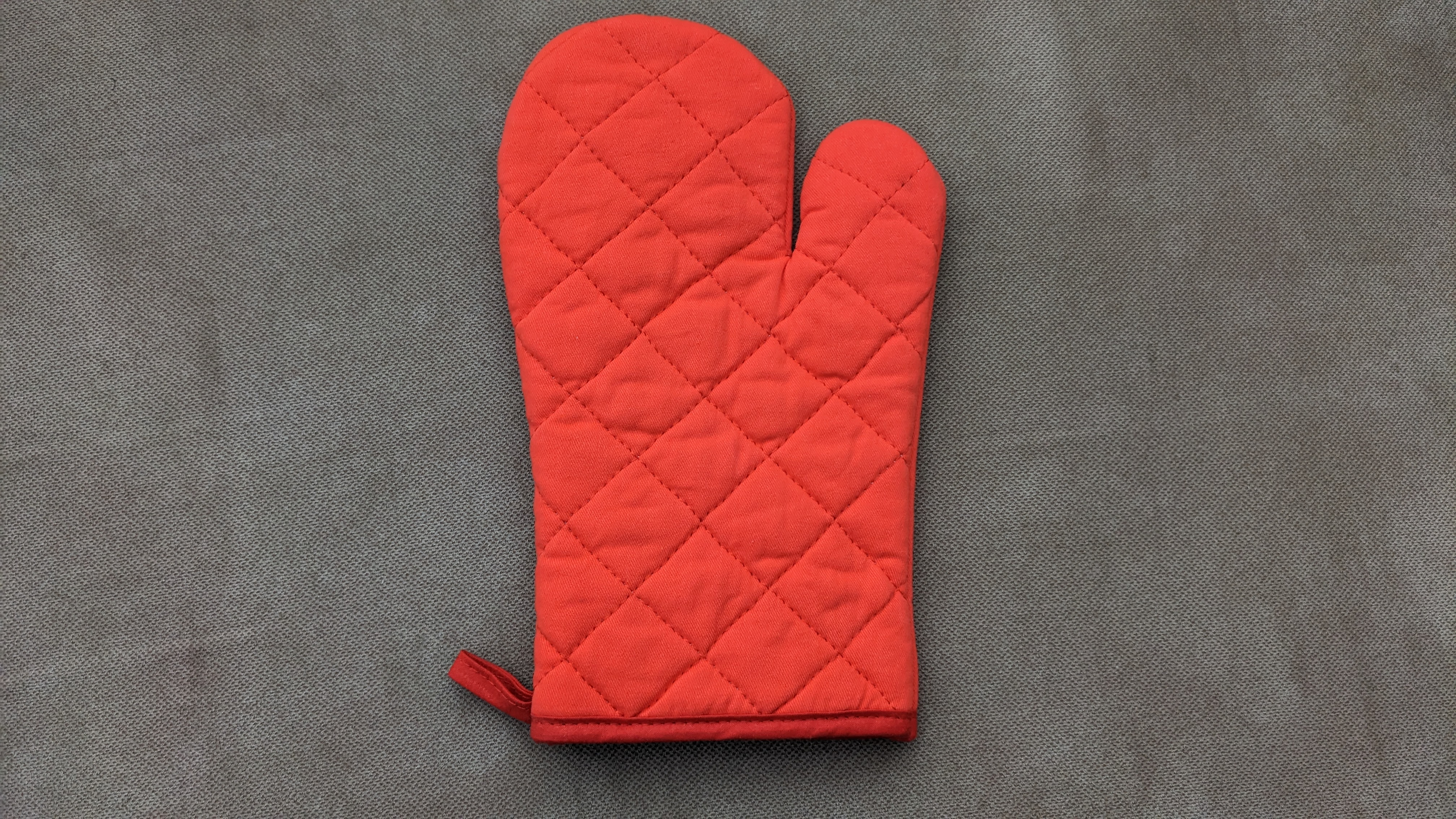
A single oven mitt

An oven glove, also commonly known as an oven mitt, is a thermal insulated glove or mitten usually worn in the kitchen to easily protect the wearer's hand from hot objects such as ovens, stoves, cookware, etc. They are functionally similar to pot-holders, but designed to be worn over one's entire hand.

Fabric oven mitts usually consist of a layer of thermal insulation surrounded by cotton fabric (often with decorative patterns). Newer oven mitts are often treated with silnylon, which makes them resistant to water and stains, or else are made of stronger synthetic materials such as Kevlar.

Single oven mitts are usually designed to be worn on either hand. Other designs consist of two gloves connected by fabric.
