= Mitten =

Type of handwear

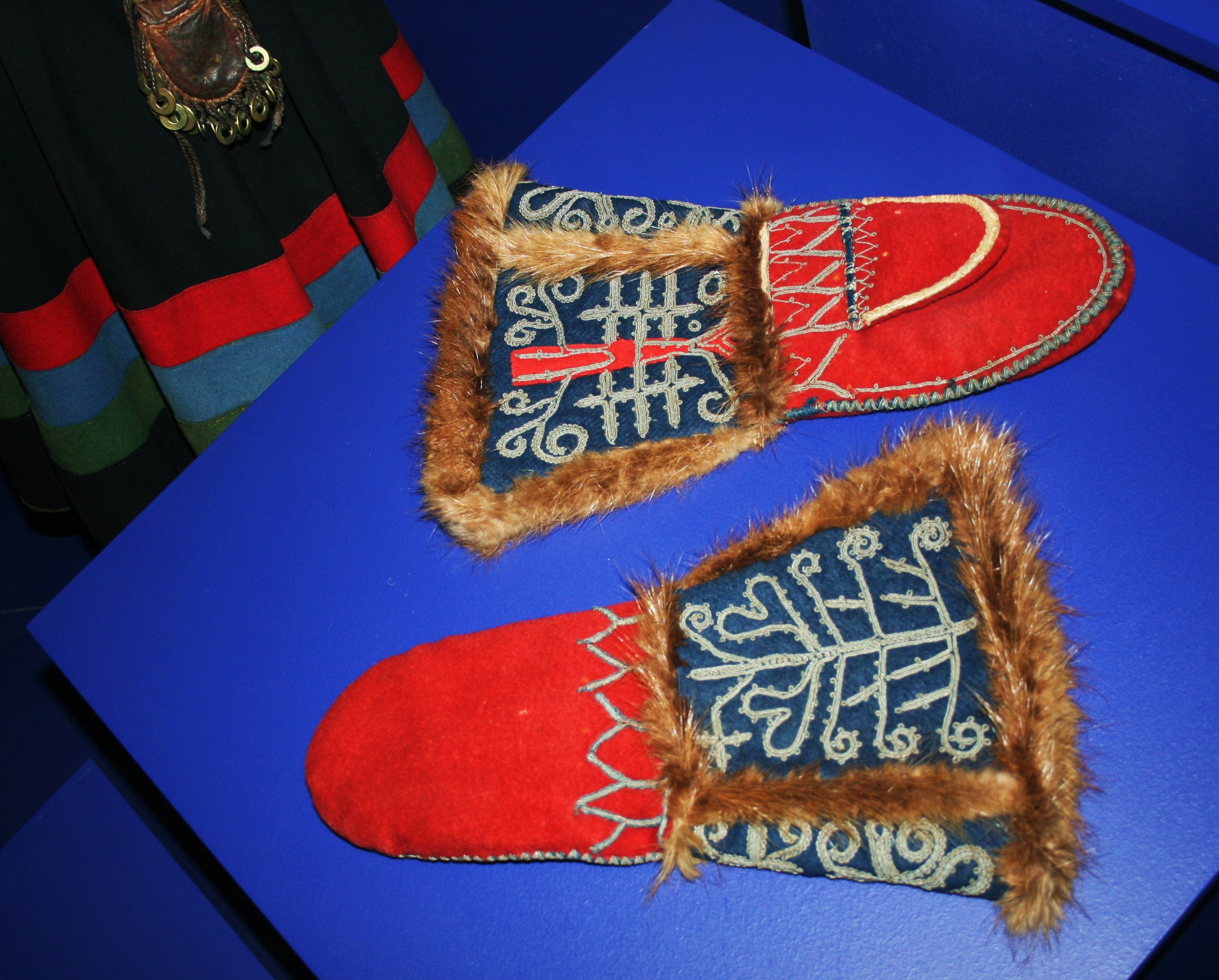
- Saami mittens
- Type: Hand protection

A mitten is a type of glove that covers the hand but does not have separate finger openings or sheaths. Generally, mittens still separate the thumb from the other four fingers. They have different colours and designs. Mittens provide greater thermal insulation than gloves as they have a smaller surface area exposed to the cold, but have a trade-off in dexterity.

Mittens are associated with cold weather, children's clothing, comfort and various occupational uses. In the English-speaking world, they also have a cultural association with domestic cats, as in the "Three Little Kittens".

Mittens are a common sight on ski slopes, as they not only provide extra warmth but extra protection from injury. They are also recommended as part of extreme cold weather clothing. Oven mitts are worn in the kitchen to protect the hands from hot objects.

== History ==
Humans have likely used mittens for millennia, but wool and other materials used to construct clothing biodegrade quickly, which limits the amount of extant relics. From Ancient Egypt several depictions of mittens survive, and some gloves found at Egyptian pyramids have been described as resembling mittens, with the collection of egyptologist Robert Hay supposedly having contained a "linen sleeve and mitten in one piece."

Some of the earliest clearly identifiable mittens date to around 1000 A.D. in Latvia, and mittens continue to be part of Latvian national costume today. Another example is a specimen found during the excavations of the early medieval trading town of Dorestad in the Netherlands: In the harbour area a mitten of wool was discovered dating from the 8th or early 9th century. Two left-handed leather mittens found on the Mary Rose are believed to have been used for falconry, whereas in modern times gloves or gauntlets are used for this purpose. From Elizabethan times, embroidered "gauntlet mittens" survive which were made from crimson silk velvet, satin and sequins, with the thread and floss dyed in twelve different colours.

When knitting became more popular in England in the 16th century, mittens were produced at home from wool. One of the earliest known mittens for children survives from this period. The is a form of circular knitting, and modern knitters often use a circular needle.

Many people around the Arctic Circle have used mittens, including other Baltic peoples, Native Americans and Vikings.

== Types ==
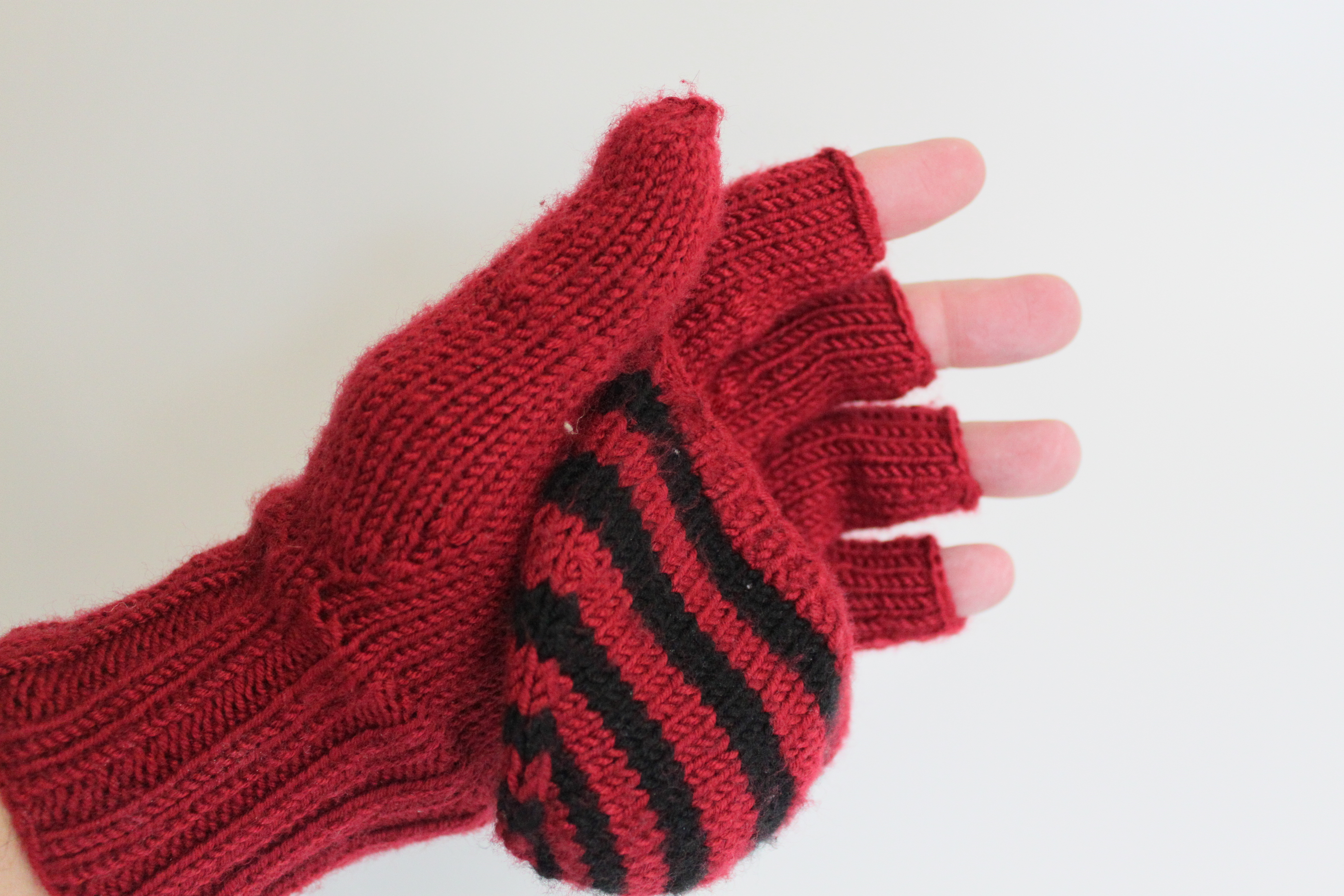
Hybrid glove / mitten

Mittens are made from several materials, including wool, leather and fur. From the late 18th century, knitting patterns were published which allowed to inscribe poems on knitted mittens.

Special types of mittens include:

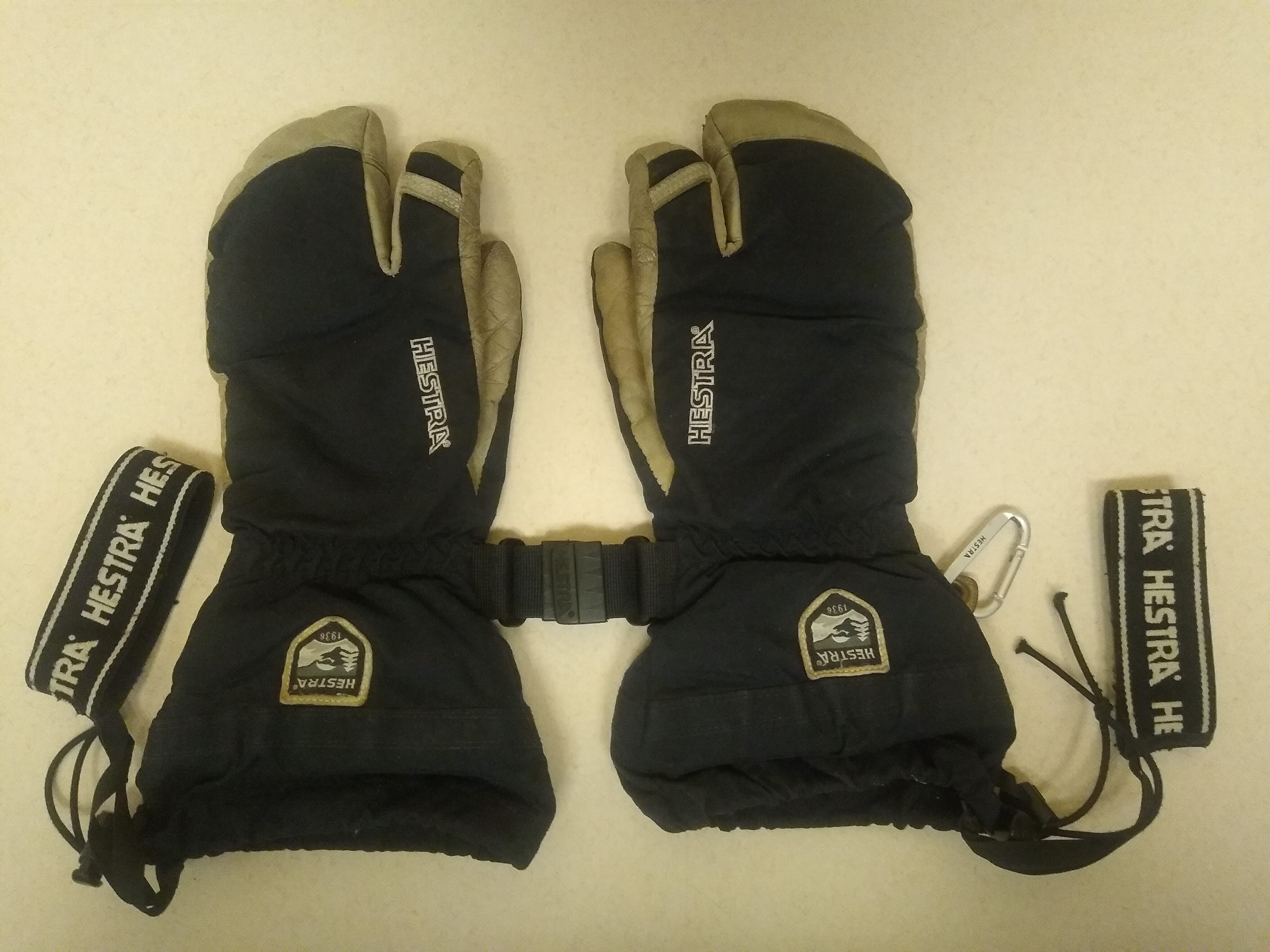
A pair of one-finger ski mittens, providing the warmth of a mitten, but offering more dexterity in gripping things. The attached wristbands prevent loss when removing the mittens.

Hunter's mittens – In the 1930s, special woolen mittens were introduced that had a flap located in the palm of the mitten so a hunter could have his finger free to fire his weapon.

Scratch mitts do not separate the thumb, and are designed to prevent babies – who do not yet have fine motor control – from scratching their faces. However, they are usually not recommended anymore as they can prevent the newborn's natural behaviour of sucking on its hand and gaining tactile experience.

Corded mittens are two mittens connected by a length of yarn, string or lace, threaded through the sleeves of a coat. This arrangement is typically provided for small children to prevent the mittens becoming discarded and lost; when removed, the mittens simply dangle from the string just beyond the cuff of the sleeve.

== In popular culture ==
The West and East Mitten Buttes, two rock formations in Monument Valley, Arizona, are popularly known as "The Mittens" because when viewed from the south, the buttes appear to be two giant mittens with their thumbs facing inwards. The Lower Peninsula of Michigan is nicknamed "The Mitten" due to its cartographic shape, and includes The Thumb.

During the inauguration of Joe Biden on 20 January 2021, a photograph of Vermont senator and former presidential candidate Bernie Sanders was taken by Agence France-Presse photographer Brendan Smialowski, depicting a masked Sanders sitting on a folding chair wearing winter clothing, most noticeably a large, fluffy pair of mittens, which were made by Vermont elementary school teacher Jen Ellis. The photograph became a popular internet meme.

=== Domestic cats ===
A nursery rhyme "Three Little Kittens", attributed to Mother Goose, narrates a woeful tale of childhood mitten loss through the fanciful title characters:

The three little kittens, they lost their mittens,
And they began to cry,
"Oh, mother dear, we sadly fear,
That we have lost our mittens."
"What! Lost your mittens, you naughty kittens!
Then you shall have no pie."

In the English-speaking world "Mittens" is a popular name for a cat – whether because of the nursery rhyme, or because some cats' fur patterns create contrasting colours on their feet, creating the impression they are "wearing mittens".

== Gallery ==
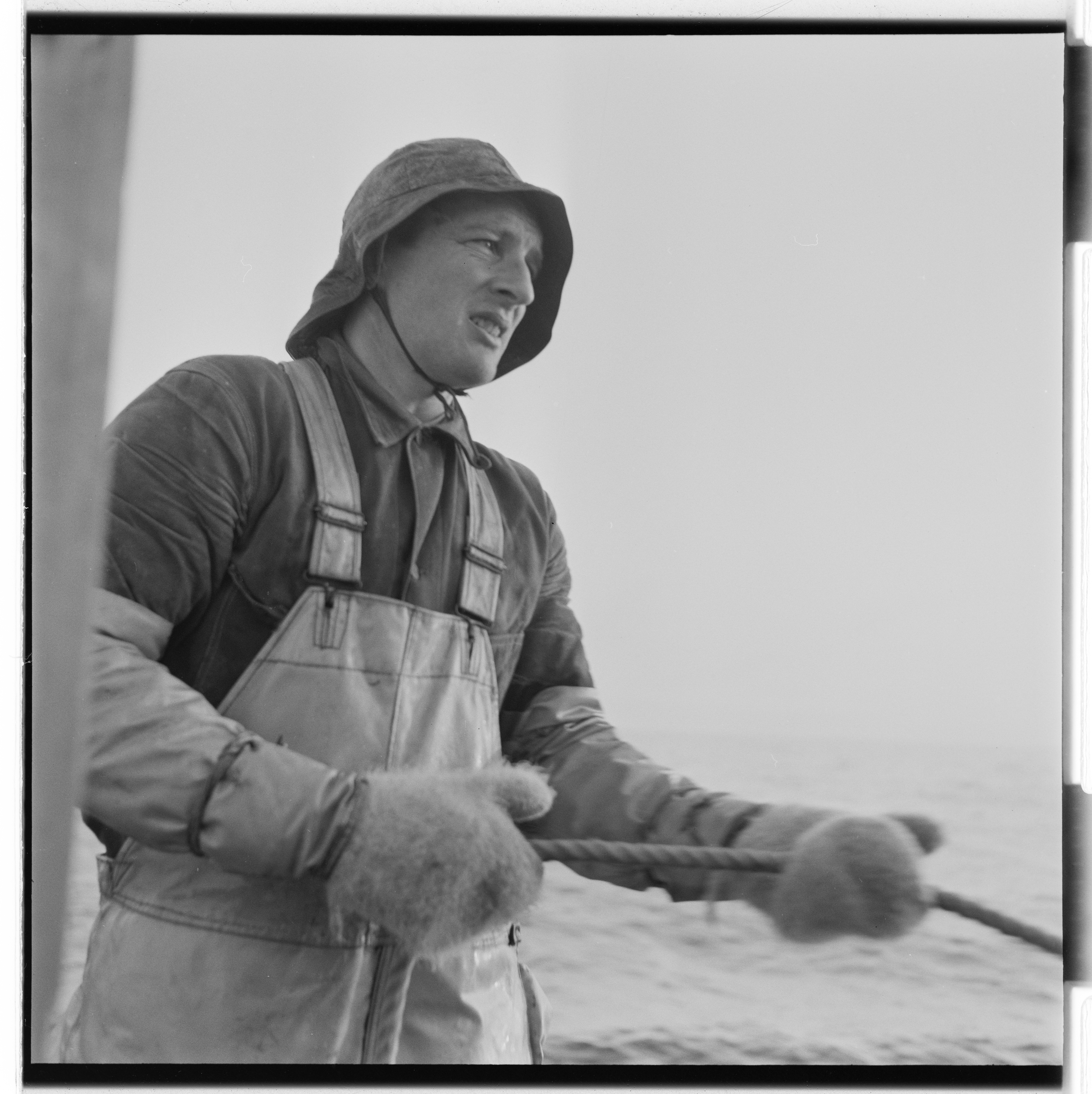
Norwegian cod fisherman using mittens (1955)

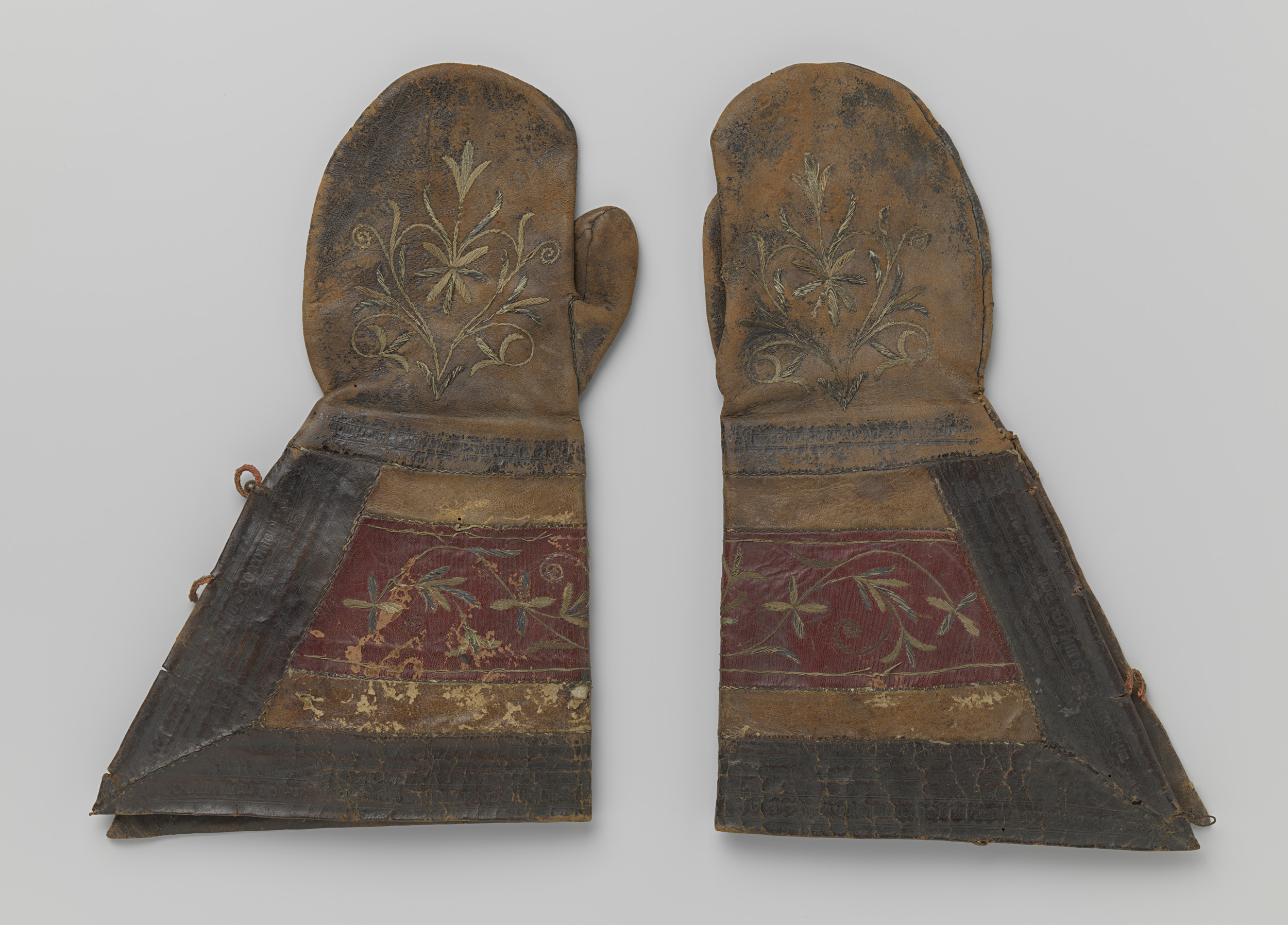
Leather mittens with colored and embroidered caps, Western Europe (1600–1650)

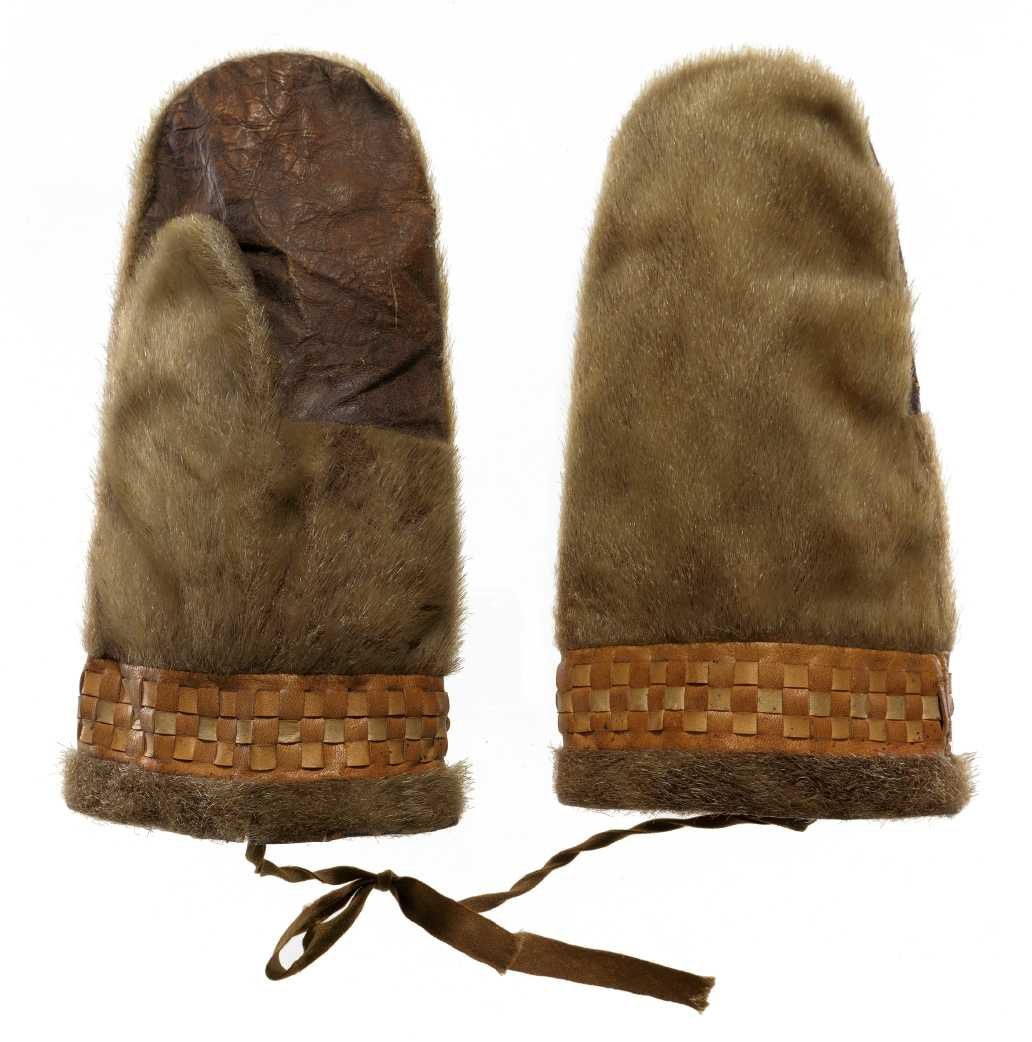
Men's seal fur mittens with sealskin palm and trim. East Greenland Inuit, Amassalik distrikt, Tasiilak

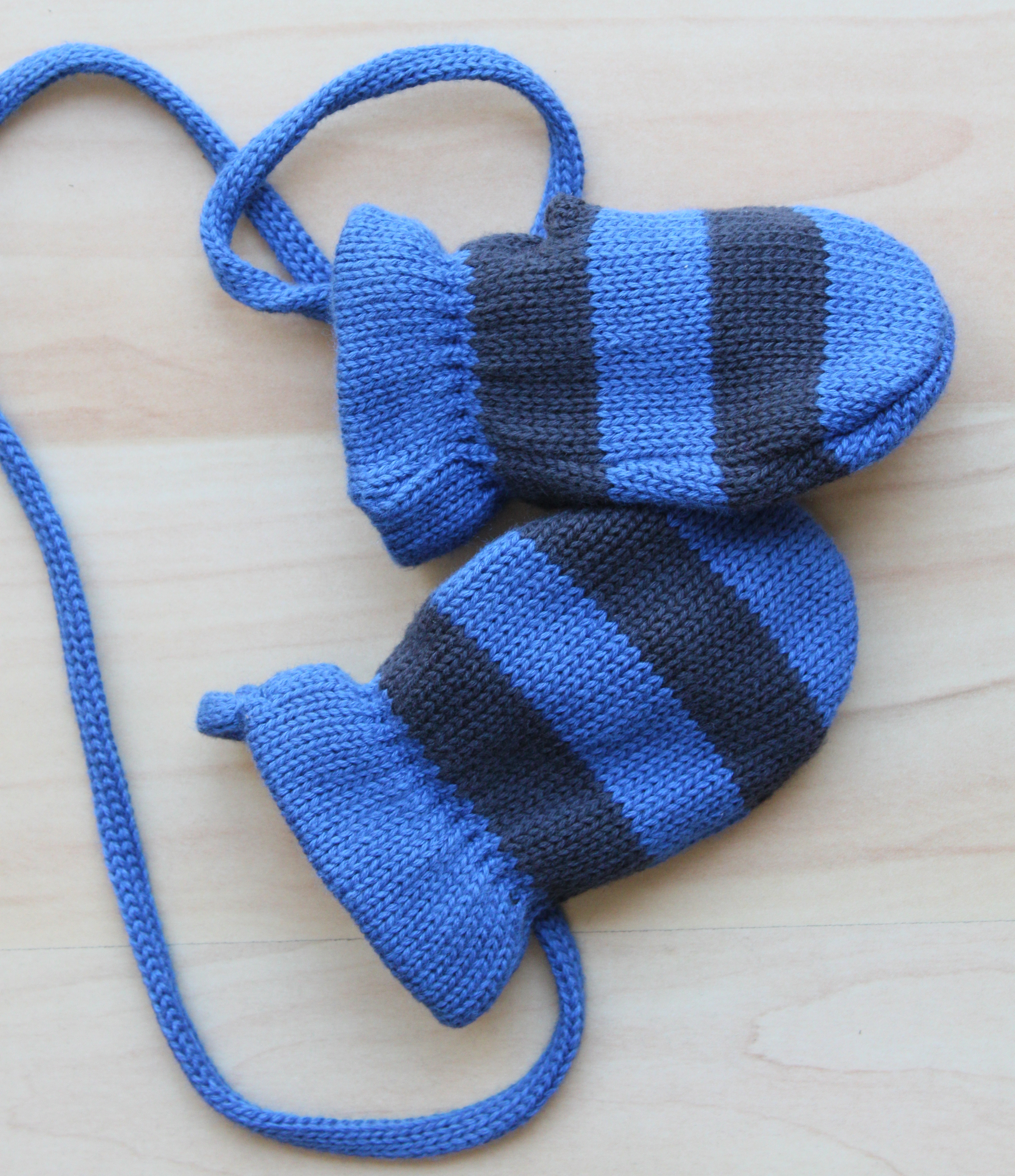
Corded mittens reduce loss, childwear

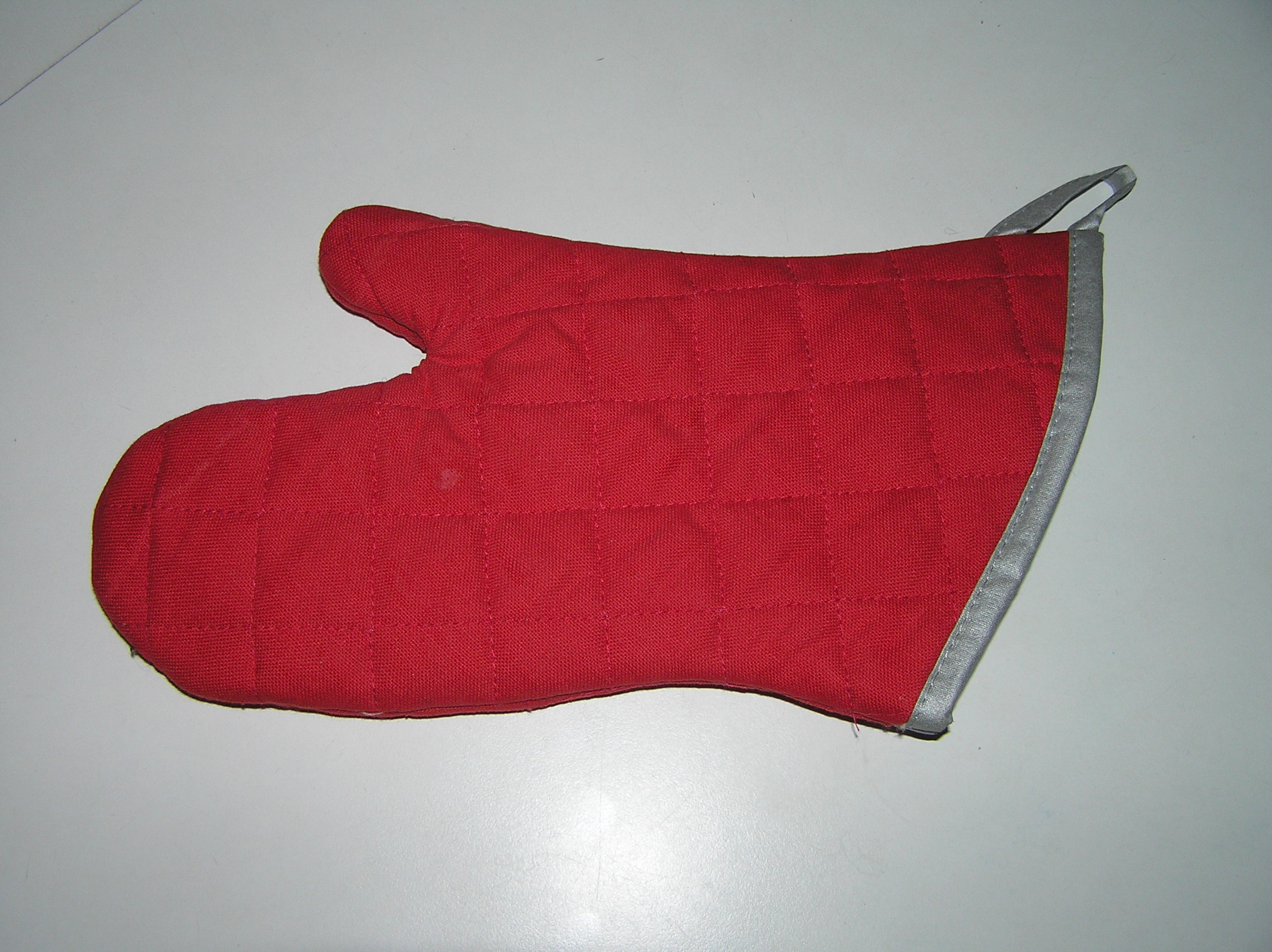
Oven mitt, protective wear

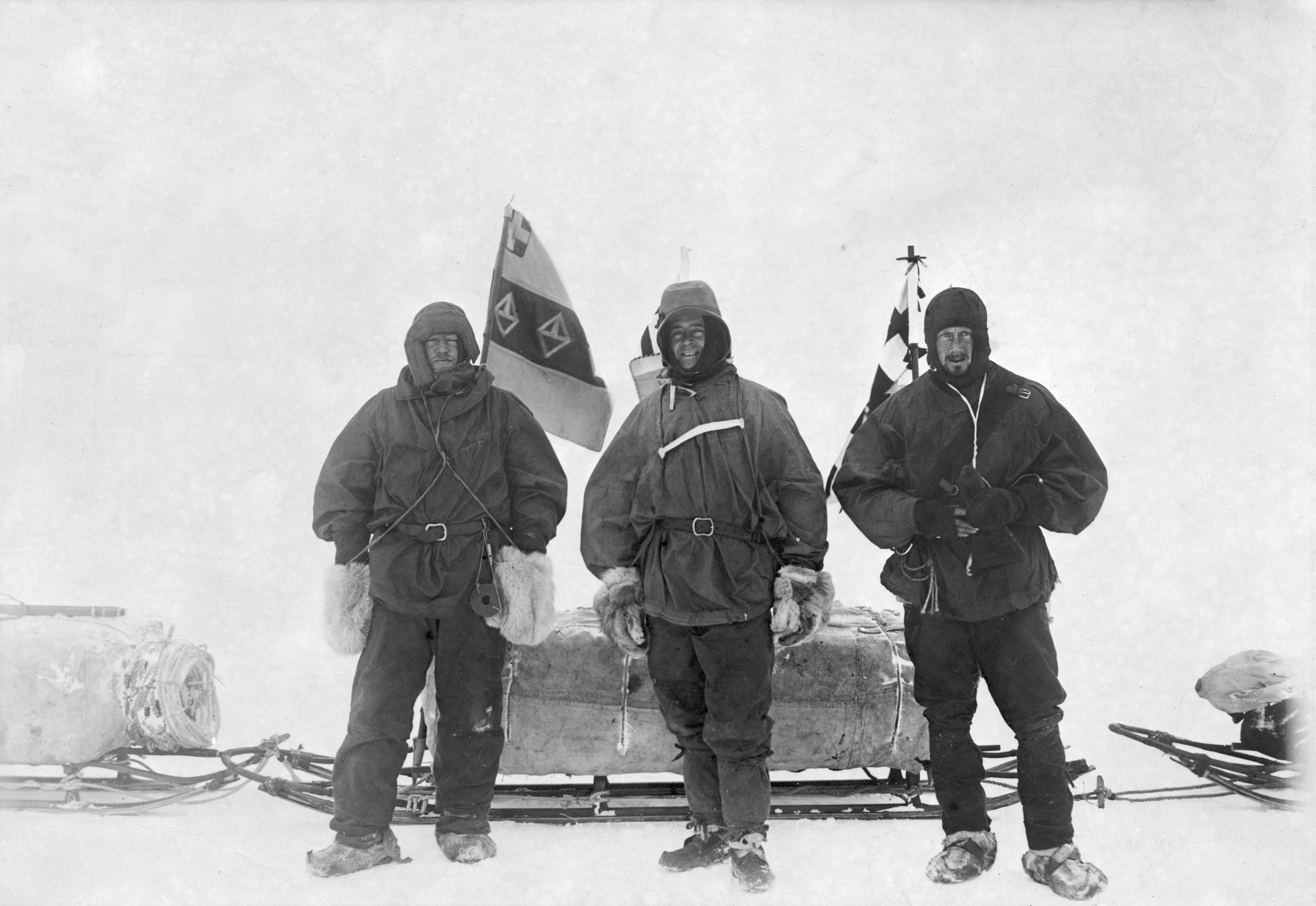
Members of the Discovery Expedition wearing thick fur mittens (1902)

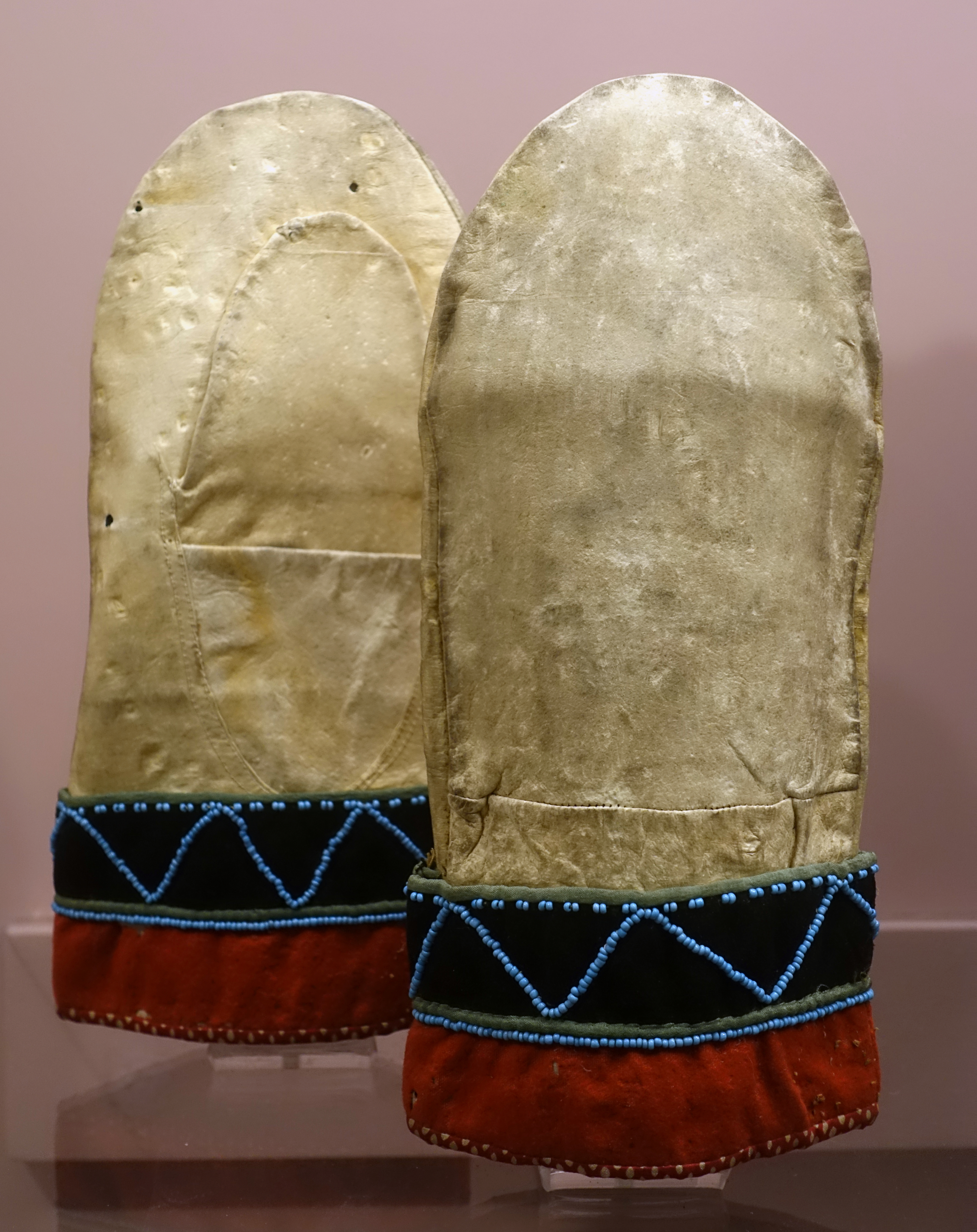
Naskapi leather mittens

== See also ==
- Glove
- Muff (handwarmer)
