= Claire McCardell =

American fashion designer (1905–1958)

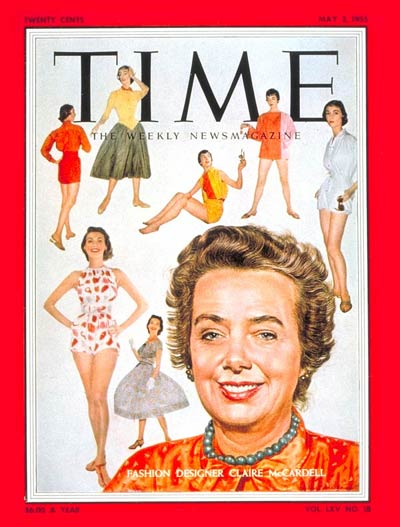
- McCardell in Time magazine in 1955
- Born: May 24, 1905; Frederick, Maryland, U.S.
- Died: March 22, 1958 (aged 52)
- Resting place: Mount Olivet Cemetery
- Occupation: Fashion designer
- Known for: credited with the creation of American sportswear
- Spouse: Irving Drought Harris (m. 1943)
- Father: A. LeRoy McCardell

Claire McCardell (May 24, 1905 – March 22, 1958) was an American fashion designer of ready-to-wear clothing in the twentieth century. She has been credited with the creation of American sportswear.

== Early life ==
McCardell was the eldest of four children born to Eleanor and A. LeRoy McCardell in Frederick, Maryland. Her father was a Maryland state senator and president of the Frederick County National Bank. As a child, McCardell earned the nickname "Kick" for her ability to keep the boys from pushing her around.

Fascinated by fashion from a young age, McCardell wanted to move to New York City to study fashion design at age 16. Unwilling to send a teenager so far away, McCardell's father convinced her to enroll in the home economics program at Hood College instead. After two years of study in Maryland, McCardell moved to New York and enrolled in Parsons (then known as the New York School of Fine and Applied Art). In 1927, McCardell went to Paris, continuing her studies at the Parsons branch school at the Place des Vosges. In Paris, McCardell and her classmates were able to purchase samples by couturiers such as Madeleine Vionnet that they took apart in order to study their structure.

McCardell graduated from Parsons with a certificate in costume design in 1923. After graduation, she worked odd jobs sketching at a fashionable dress shop, painting flowers on paper lamp shades, and acting as a fit model for B. Altman. Then she met designer Robert Turk.

== 1930s and 1940s ==
Late in 1930, McCardell began working as an assistant designer for Robert Turk. Soon afterward, Turk moved to a larger company, Townley Frocks, and brought McCardell with him. In 1932, Turk drowned and McCardell was asked to finish his fall line.

The 27-year-old chief designer soon traveled to Paris for inspiration, as did most American designers. Not interested in copying European high fashion, McCardell searched for inspiration in art and street fashion. During the 1930s, she began to show innovations such as sashes, spaghetti string ties, and the use of menswear details that would become part of her design signature. In 1938, she modernized the dirndl. She also pioneered matching separates.

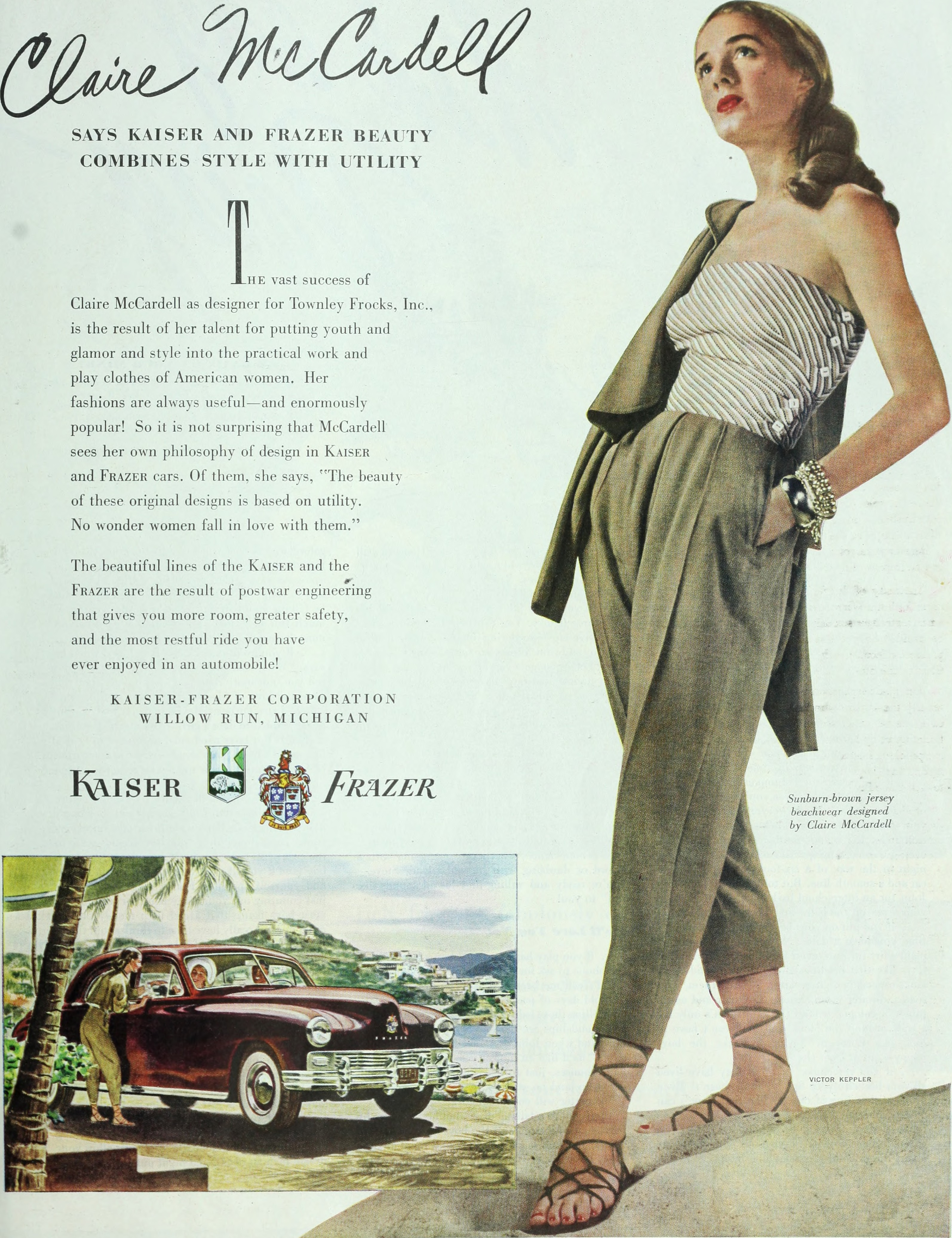
Beachwear designed by McCardell circa 1948

In 1938, McCardell introduced the Monastic Dress, a bias-cut tentlike dress. It had no seamed waist and hung loosely, but with a versatile belt it could be adapted to hug a woman's curves gracefully. Best & Co. exclusively sold the dress for $29.95 and it sold out in a day. The "Monastic Dress" was widely copied and the cost of trying to stop knock-offs drove Townley Frocks out of business.

After the closure of Townley Frocks, Hattie Carnegie hired McCardell to work for her famed dressmaking firm, but her designs were not successful with Carnegie's clients, who were in search of more elaborate merchandise. While working for Hattie Carnegie, McCardell met Diana Vreeland (then at Harper's Bazaar). She would become McCardell's lifelong friend and champion. In 1940, just before leaving Carnegie, McCardell attended her last Parisian fashion show, preferring from then on to avoid any French influence on her clothing.

Townley Frocks reopened in 1940 under new management and McCardell returned to the brand. The company's labels then read, "Claire McCardell Clothes by Townley", making her one of the first American designers to have name recognition.

World War II cut American designers off from European inspiration and limited the availability of some materials. McCardell flourished under these restrictions. Although many designers considered them too basic, McCardell already worked with fabrics such as denim, calico, and wool jersey that were easily available during the war. She popularized the ballet flat when, responding to the shortage of leather, McCardell commissioned Capezio to produce a range of ballet flats to match her designs. When the government announced a surplus of weather balloon cotton materials in 1944, McCardell quickly bought them up, using them to design clothes that patriotic American women wore with pride.

In 1941, McCardell produced a line of separates that made nine outfits from five pieces. The pieces included a taffeta skirt, a jersey top, and a jersey jacket. That same year, she showed her first "Kitchen Dinner Dress". Made of cotton, the "Kitchen Dinner Dress" had a full skirt with an attached apron.

In 1942, McCardell created her famed "Popover Dress". It was a response to a Harper's Bazaar challenge to create something fashionable one could wear to clean the house and then, wear to a cocktail party. The simple grey dress came with a matching potholder that fit into the dress pocket. The "Popover Dress" sold for $6.95 and more than 75,000 were sold in the first season alone. These dresses became a staple of McCardell collections and over time, she made versions in different lengths and fabrics. The "Popover Dress" received a citation from the American Fashion Critics Association and in 1943, McCardell won a Coty Award.

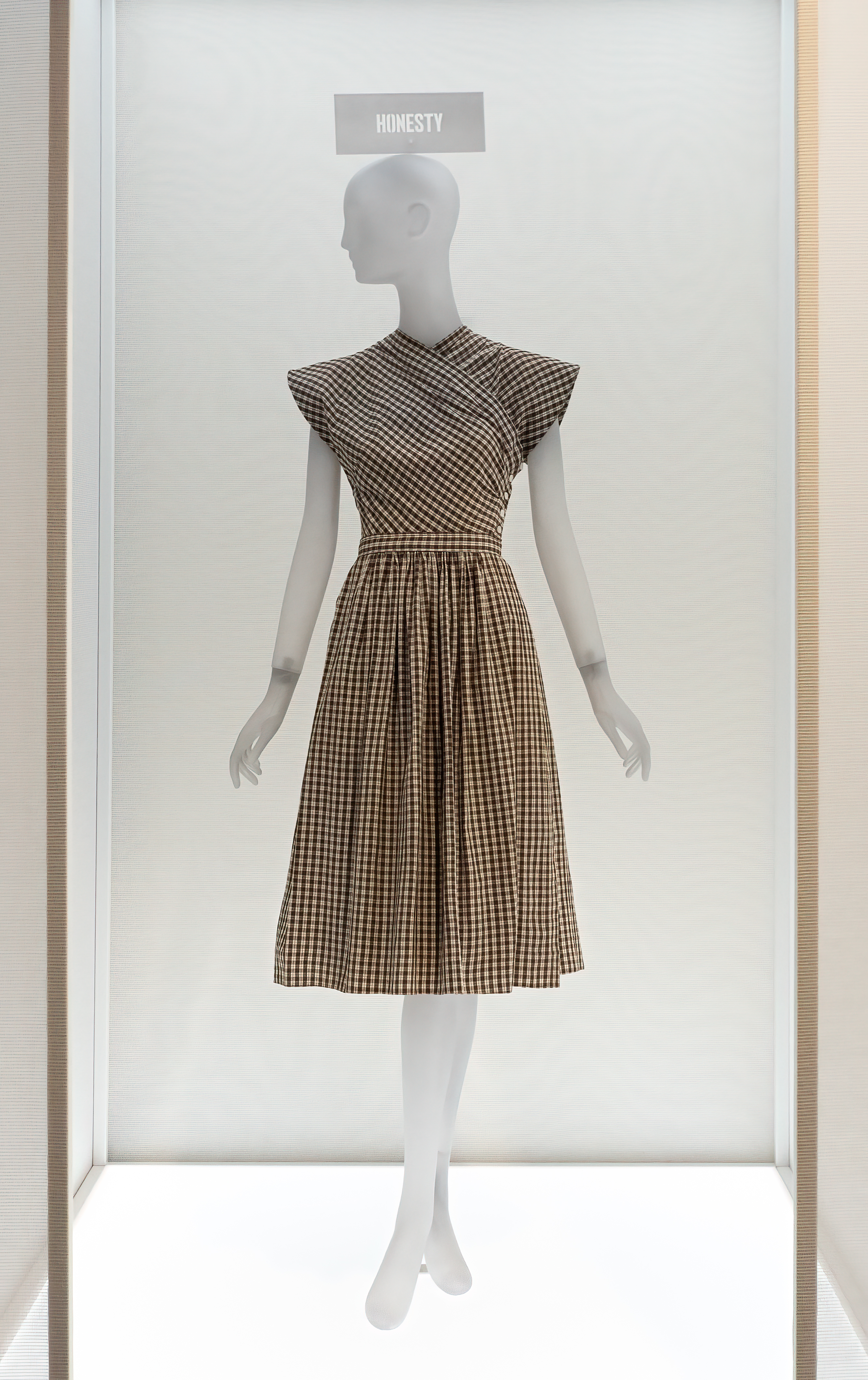
Dress by McCardell from 1943 at the Metropolitan Museum of Art in the exhibit In America: A Lexicon of Fashion

Beginning in 1945, McCardell was featured as an "American Look" designer by Lord & Taylor's department store. In 1946, McCardell won the Best Sportswear Designer Award and in 1948 she won the Neiman-Marcus Award.

== 1950s ==
After the war, McCardell worked as a volunteer critic in the fashion design department at Parsons. In 1950, President Harry S. Truman, Bess Truman, and Margaret Truman presented McCardell with a Woman of the Year Award from the Women's National Press Club. This was the award McCardell cherished most.

As McCardell's fame grew, her influence within Townley also rose. In 1952, she became a partner in the company.

Also in 1952, McCardell and American Optical released their own version of cat eye glasses, the first eyewear line by a fashion designer.

In April 1953, the Frank Perls Gallery in Beverly Hills launched a retrospective exhibition of twenty years of McCardell's garments. The exhibit included the "Monastic Dress", the "Diaper Bathing Suit", Capezio ballet flats, and work-wear-inspired pieces with rivets. In his introduction to the exhibit, retailer Stanley Marcus wrote, "...she is one of the truly creative designers this country has produced... She is to America what Vionnet was to France."

In 1954, she worked on an advisory panel formed by Time Inc. to create a new magazine that would become Sports Illustrated. She was on the cover of Time on May 2, 1955.

A book entitled What Shall I Wear? The What, Where, When, and How Much of Fashion was published in 1957 under McCardell's name.

== Personal life and death ==
In 1943, McCardell married the Texas-born architect, Irving Drought Harris, who had two children by an earlier marriage, and established a home base in Manhattan, New York City.

McCardell's life and work were cut short by a diagnosis of terminal colon cancer in 1957. With the help of long-time friend and classmate, Mildred Orrick, McCardell completed her final collection from her hospital bed. She checked out of the hospital in order to make the introductions for her final runway show. McCardell died on March 22, 1958, at the age of 52, a year after her diagnosis. She was buried at Mount Olivet Cemetery in Frederick.

After her death, McCardell's family decided to close the label. Her brother explained, "It wasn't that difficult [to close the label]. Claire's ideas were always her own."

== Legacy and influence ==
In 1981, Lord & Taylor re-issued the "Popover Dress" as part of a McCardell retrospective at their Fifth Avenue store in Manhattan. Versions of the "Popover Dress" are held by the Metropolitan Museum of Art, the Rhode Island School of Design, and the Museum at F.I.T. Versions of the "Monastic Dress" are held by the Metropolitan Museum of Art and LACMA.

In 1990, Life named McCardell one of the 100 most important Americans of the twentieth century. A year later, she was inducted into the Maryland Women's Hall of Fame.

In 1998, forty years after her death, three separate retrospectives of McCardell's work were staged at Metropolitan Museum of Art, Fashion Institute of Technology, and the Maryland Historical Society in Baltimore.

Fashion designers such as Isaac Mizrahi, Donna Karan, Calvin Klein, Norma Kamali, and Cynthia Rowley all have been influenced by McCardell. Anna Sui's line of spring-summer 1999 was directly inspired by her work. Of McCardell's work Anna Sui said, "What I truly appreciate was her fabric sensibility, even with more constructed fabrics like denim. She made them all look so soft and drapy. The halters she did were so modern. The thing is, you look at some of the things she did, and you can't believe it was the 40s.''

In 2019, the Frederick Art Club launched the Claire McCardell Project to underwrite the creation and installation of a larger-than-life bronze statue of McCardell in her hometown of Frederick, Maryland. The club commissioned award-winning sculptor Sarah Hempel Irani for this monumental task and, thanks to community support, reached its fundraising goal in less than two years. In October 2021, the statue was placed on a granite pedestal in an elegant garden setting in Frederick's Carroll Creek Park.

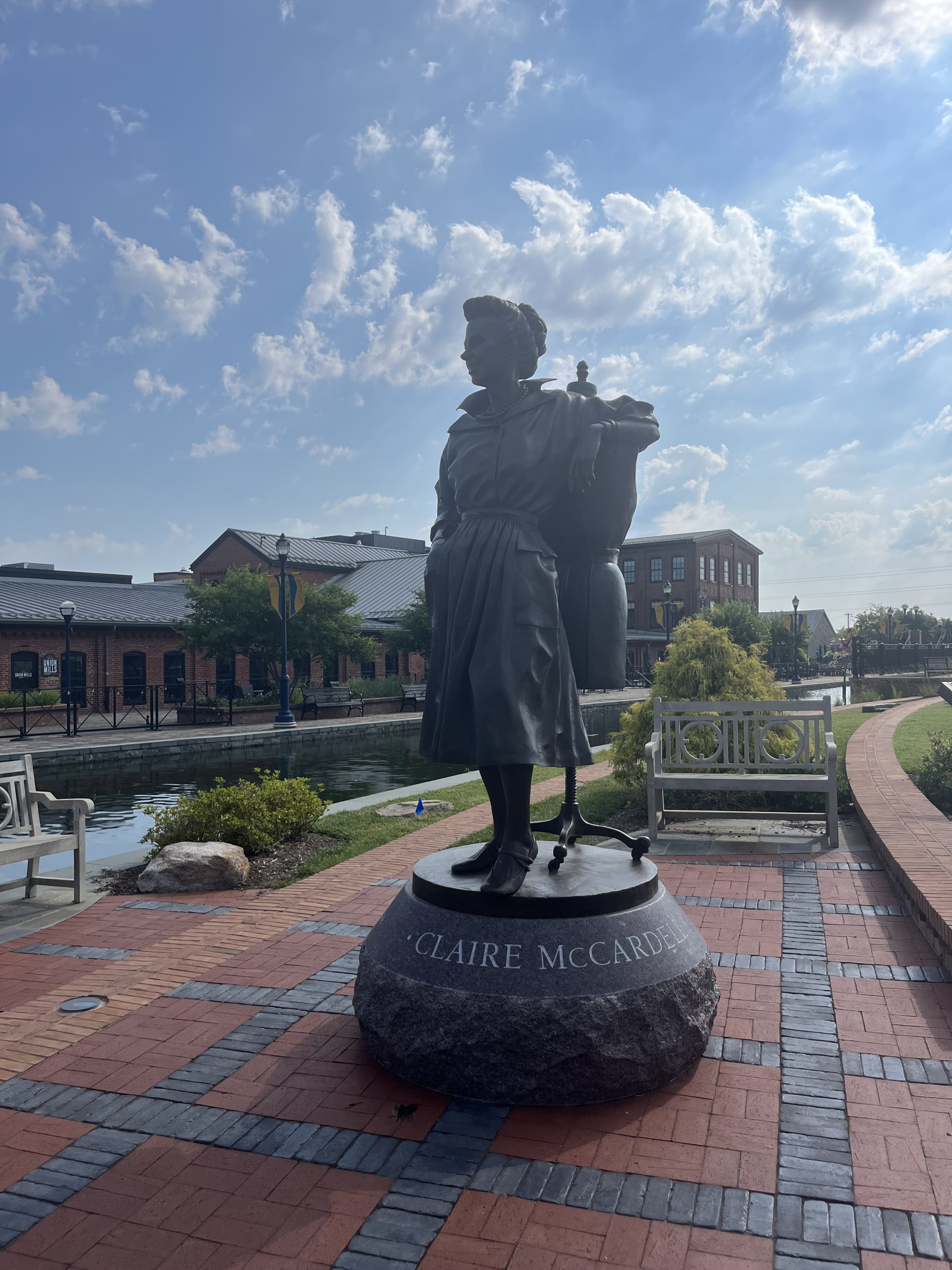
Statue of Claire McCardell - Frederick, MD

Elizabeth Evitts Dickinson published the first biography of McCardell in 2025, Claire McCardell: The Designer Who Set Women Free.

== Characteristics of McCardell designs ==
- 1938 Monastic dress – a bias-cut, tent-shaped garment with dolman sleeves, belted with spaghetti ties that wrap multiple times around the waist to create shape
- 1942 Popover dress – versatile wrap dress with patch pockets and wide dolman sleeves that could be "popped" over other clothes and used as a housedress; also worn as a dressing gown or party dress
- Diaper bathing suit – made of light cotton with a panel that wrapped up between the legs, and was secured by thin strings
- Streamlined wool bathing suits
- Pockets in everything from capris to evening gowns
- Ballet slippers as everyday footwear
- Trouser pockets and pleats in women's wear
- Zippers on the side instead of the back, enabling women to dress without assistance
- Revealing sundresses and casual wear
- Fabric draping and gathering to accentuate the natural shape of the body
- Use of common, natural-fiber fabrics such as cotton, twill, gingham, denim, and jersey in a variety of garments, not just as day wear
- Elimination of highly structured undergarments such as corsets, crinolines, and girdles
- Use of rivets and other work clothes fasteners
