= Sportswear (fashion) =

Fashion category of relaxed day clothes, originally separates

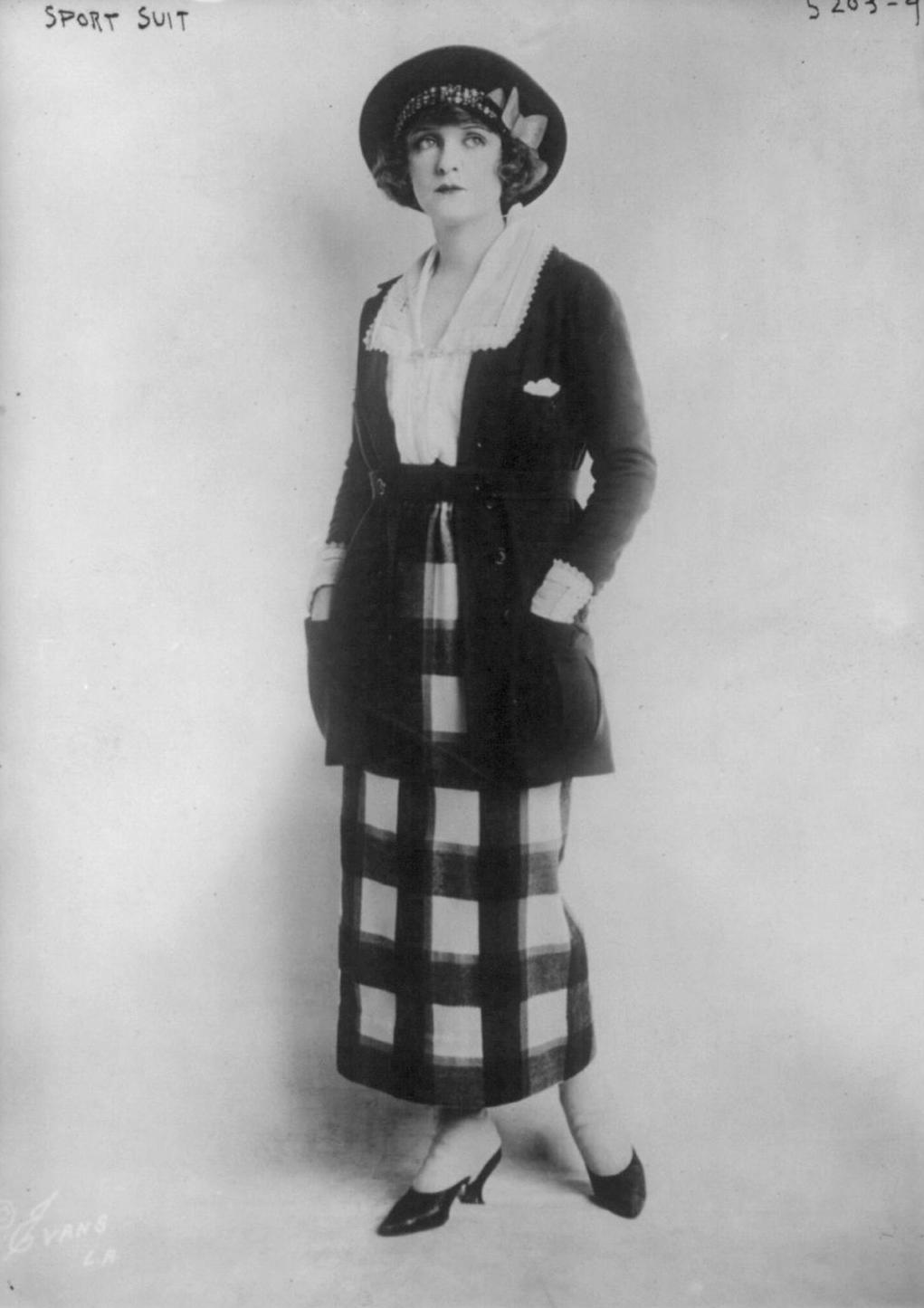
Woman wearing a "sport suit," American, June 1920. Sportswear originally described interchangeable separates, as here. Signed "Evans, LA"

Sportswear, in the context of fashion, sometimes called athleisure, is a style of dress that has its roots in the athletic apparel traditionally worn by sportsmen and women, but which has since evolved to become a broad and globally recognisable genre of fashion. Its popularity stems from a combination of comfort, practicality, and a distinctive visual identity. Typical garments include hoodies, tracksuits, leggings, sweatshirts, and sneakers, often featuring prominent manufacturer branding.

The term originated in America, and at first was used to describe separate jacket and trousers worn rather than a full men's suit. Since the 1930s it referred to day and evening fashions of varying degrees of formality that demonstrate a specific relaxed approach to their design, while remaining appropriate for a wide range of social occasions. The term predated activewear (clothing designed specifically for participants in sporting pursuits), but the two terms are now often used synonymously. Although sports clothing was available from European haute couture houses and "sporty" garments were increasingly worn as everyday or informal wear, the early American sportswear designers were associated with ready-to-wear manufacturers. While most fashions in America in the early 20th century were directly copied from, or influenced heavily by Paris, American sportswear became a home-grown exception to this rule, and could be described as the American Look. Sportswear was designed to be easy to look after, with accessible fastenings that enabled a modern emancipated woman to dress herself without a maid's assistance.

== Definition ==
Sportswear has been called America's main contribution to the history of fashion design, developed to cater to the needs of the increasingly fast-paced lifestyle of American women. It started out as a fashion industry term describing informal and interchangeable separates (i.e., blouses, shirts, skirts and shorts), and in the 1920s became a popular word for relaxed, casual wear typically worn for spectator sports. Since the 1930s, the term has been used to describe both day and evening fashions of varying degrees of formality that demonstrate this relaxed approach while remaining appropriate wear for many business or social occasions.

The curator Richard Martin put on an exhibition on sportswear in 1985 at the Fashion Institute of Technology, in which he described sportswear as "an American invention, an American industry, and an American expression of style." For Martin, American sportswear was an expression of various predominantly middle-class aspects of American culture, including health ideals, the concept of democracy, ideas of comfort and function, and innovative design which might refer to historical concepts or leisure attributes. The establishment of a five-day working week and an eight-hour working day in America in the mid-20th century led to the need for clothing which enabled the fullest possible enjoyment of such increased leisure time, and was designed accordingly. A subsequent exhibition of 1930s-70s sportswear, also curated by Martin, at the Metropolitan Museum of Art in 1998, was introduced by Philippe de Montebello as showing pioneering garments, whose modesty, comparative simplicity, and wearability treated fashion as a "pragmatic art." de Montebello carefully explained how significant American designers such as Norman Norell, Pauline Trigère, Charles James and Mainbocher, were not considered sportswear designers, as they were not dedicated to the design principles of versatility, accessibility and affordability in the way that Claire McCardell or Emily Wilkens were.

The "American Look", which is an alternative term for American sportswear, was coined in 1932 by Lord & Taylor executive Dorothy Shaver.

== History of sportswear design ==
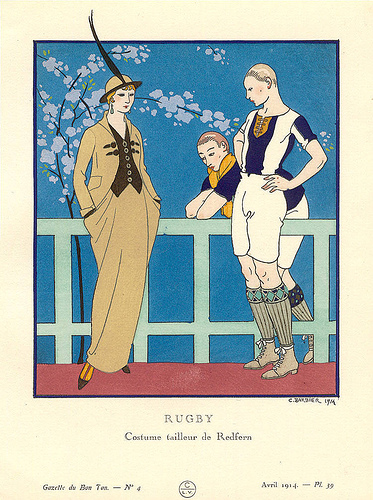
Pre-sportswear tailormade by Redfern. Bon Ton, April 1914.

=== Pre-1920 ===
Sportswear originally described activewear: clothing made specifically for sport. Part of the evolution of sportswear was triggered by 19th-century developments in female activewear, such as early bathing or cycling costumes, which demanded shorter skirts, bloomers, and other specific garments to enable mobility, whilst sports such as tennis or croquet could be played in barely-modified conventional dress. One of the first couturiers to specialise in sports-specific clothing was the British John Redfern who in the 1870s began designing tailored garments for increasingly active women who rode, played tennis, went yachting, and did archery. Redfern's clothes, although intended for specific sporting pursuits, were adopted as everyday wear by his clients, making him probably the first sportswear designer. Also in the late nineteenth century, garments associated with activewear and/or modified from menswear, such as the shirtwaist began to form part of the working woman's wardrobe. Prior to 1920, men and women could both demonstrate their being at leisure simply by removing a jacket, either literally in the case of menswear, or metaphorically by a woman wearing a shirtwaist blouse that resembled a man's shirt worn without a jacket.

Martin has observed that in America, prior to increasing worker freedoms from the mid-late 19th century onwards, leisure had been a luxury available only to the leisured classes during the Industrial Revolution (c. 1760 – c. 1860), and before that, Puritan America had condemned leisure for all. He cites the 1884 Georges Seurat painting A Sunday Afternoon on the Island of La Grande Jatte as an immobile, "static and stratified" depiction of leisure in "direct antithesis" of the relaxed, casual American equivalent. T.J. Clarke notes how La Grande Jatte illustrates people from the breadth of Paris society taking advantage of their free time by going to the riverside to show off new clothes, but that the act of removing one's jacket or otherwise loosening garments as a signifier of actually being at leisure was almost never done.

=== 1920s ===
While 1920s Paris designers offered haute couture designs that could be considered sportswear, it was typically not their design focus. A notable exception was the tennis player Jane Régny (the pseudonym of Madame Balouzet Tillard de Tigny), who opened a couture house specialising in clothing for sport and travel. Another famous tennis player, Suzanne Lenglen, was director of the sportswear department at Jean Patou. In contrast to the flexibility of American sportswear, these expensive couture garments were typically prescribed for very specific circumstances. Many couturiers began designing clothing that, whilst suitable for sport, could be worn in a wider range of contexts. Coco Chanel, who promoted her own active, financially independent lifestyle through relaxed jersey suits and uncluttered dresses, became famous for clothes of "the sports type." In 1926 Harper's Bazaar reported upon Chanel's sporty garments, noting the absence of equivalent apparel from New York fashion presentations. However, Martin has noted that while Chanel was undeniably important and influential, her work was always based on couture construction rather than the easy-wear nature of American sportswear.

As more generic, versatile sportswear became more prominent in the Paris collections, the press increasingly promoted the wearing of such garments in an everyday context. By the mid-1920s, American advertisers also began actively pushing the idea that sporty clothing was just as appropriate for regular daywear as it was for active pursuits, presenting it as the epitome of modernity and the American ideal. One advertisement put out by Abercrombie & Fitch in Vogue in 1929 suggested that while men might admire a girl in a glamorous evening gown, they would be less intimidated by her approachable, friendly appearance in good-quality sportswear. Sportswear was also presented as an accessible version of resort wear, a term for the luxurious travelling clothing and holiday wear worn by those who could afford a leisurely lifestyle with multiple vacations, such as cruises, yachting, and skiing. Affordable, well-designed all-American sportswear was presented as a way of enabling a less wealthy customer to feel part of that same lifestyle. However, at first, American apparel firms mostly copied French styles.

Despite the acceptance of fashionable sportswear as a form of casual dressing in French fashion in the 1920s, the American garment industry went on to become the most prominent producers of such clothing. The key difference between French and American sportswear was that French sportswear was usually a small part of a high-end designer's output, while the American sportswear designers focused on affordable, versatile, easy-care garments that could be mass-produced and were relevant to the customer's lifestyle, enabling the modern, increasingly emancipated woman to dress herself without a maid's assistance. Although the influence of Europe, particularly Parisian high fashion and English tailoring, was always significant, the Great Depression which started in 1929 acted as a trigger to encourage American fashion to focus on homegrown style and design – particularly sportswear. With 13 million Americans left unemployed by the Depression, it was necessary to create jobs and reduce the competition from imported goods in order to improve the American economy. At the same time, the growth of female athleticism and increased female employment fueled a need for simpler and less expensive clothing.

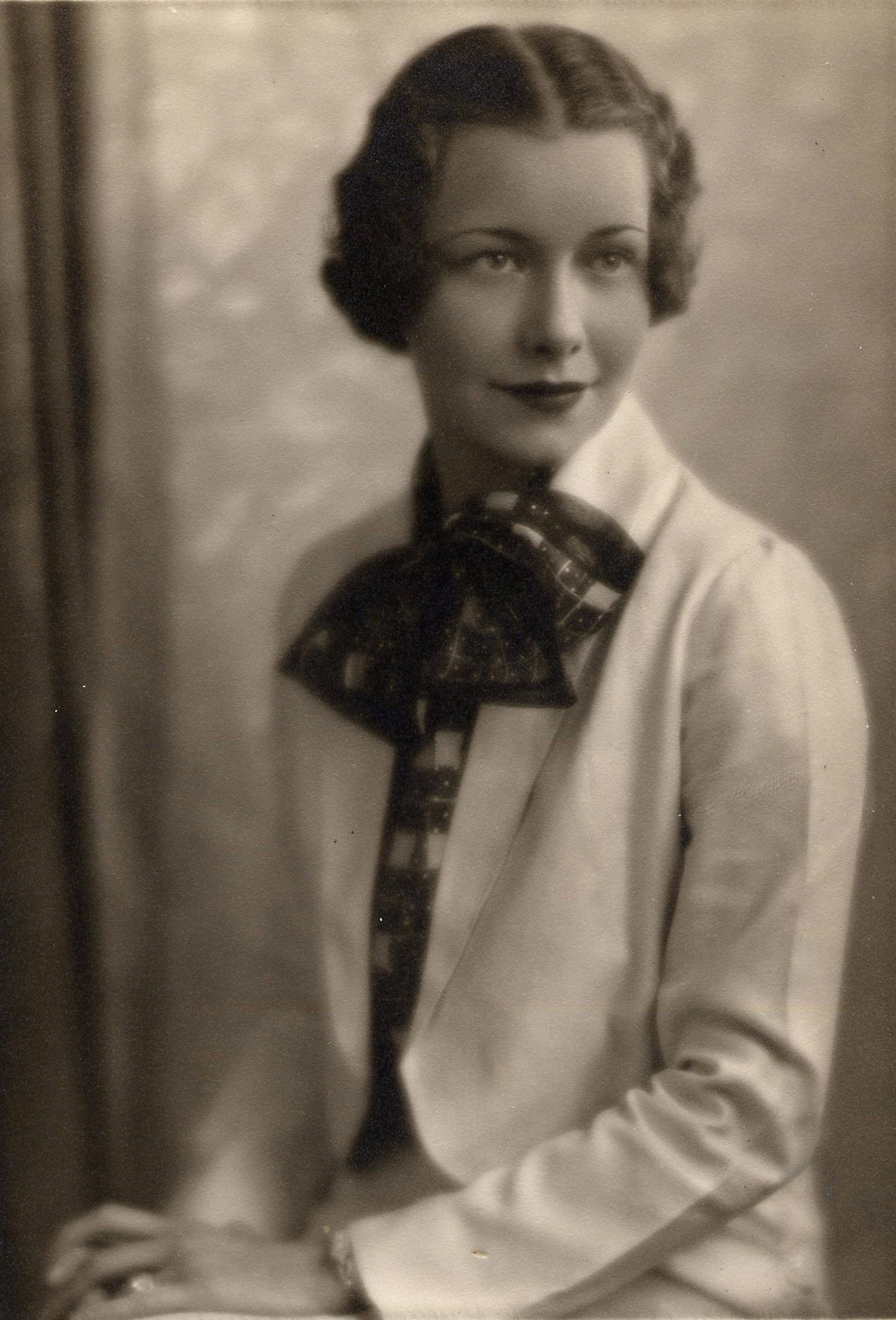
A smart young woman in a lightweight jacket and printed silk blouse. American, 1935.

=== 1930–1945 ===
The precursors of true sportswear emerged in New York before the Second World War. Clare Potter and Claire McCardell were among the first American designers in the 1930s to gain name recognition through their innovative clothing designs, which Martin described as demonstrating "problem-solving ingenuity and realistic lifestyle applications". Garments were designed to be easy-to-wear and comfortable, using practical fabrics such as denim, cotton, and jersey. McCardell in particular has been described as America's greatest sportswear designer. She has even been credited with the creation of American sportswear. Her simple, practical clothes suited the relaxed American dress code, neither formal nor informal, that became established during the 1930s and 1940s. McCardell once proclaimed: "I belong to a mass production country where any of us, all of us, deserve the right to good fashion." Martin credits the 1930s and 40s sportswear designers with freeing American fashion from the need to copy Paris couture. Where Paris fashion was traditionally imposed onto the customer regardless of her wishes, American sportswear was democratic, widely available, and encouraged self-expression. The early sportswear designers proved that the creation of original ready-to-wear fashion could be a legitimate design art which responded stylishly to utilitarian requirements.

Many of the first sportswear designers were women, including McCardell, Potter, Elizabeth Hawes, Emily Wilkens, Tina Leser, and Vera Maxwell. A common argument was that female designers projected their personal values into this new style. One of the few male designers at this time was Tom Brigance, who by the late 1930s was regularly ranked alongside Potter as a leading name in mid-range priced sportswear. Like Potter, Brigance understood how to design smart and fashionable clothing for mass-production, which made his clothes attractive to manufacturers as well as to customers. Two other notable male designers of sportswear at this time were Sydney Wragge and John Weitz.

In the 1930s and '40s, it was rare for clothing to be justified through its practicality. It was traditionally thought that Paris fashion exemplified beauty, and therefore, sportswear required different criteria for assessment. The designer's personal life was therefore linked to their sportswear designs. Another selling point was sportswear's popularity with consumers, with department store representatives such as Dorothy Shaver of Lord & Taylor using sales figures to back up their claims. Maxwell and Potter were two of the first three sportswear designers, along with Helen Cookman, to be showcased and name-checked in Shaver's window displays and advertisements for Lord & Taylor. Between 1932 and 1939, Shaver's "American Look" program at Lord & Taylor promoted over sixty American designers including McCardell, Potter and Merry Hull. Shaver advertised her American designers as if they were French couturiers, and promoted their lower costs as a positive feature, rather than a sign of inferiority. One of Shaver's retail experiments was a 'College Shop' section in the store, opened in the early 1930s and run by her assistant Helen Maddock, with the intent of offering casual but flattering clothing to young female college students. The stock, however, ended up selling swiftly to adult women as well as to the students.

Among the key designs produced by this new generation of American designers were capsule wardrobes such as McCardell's group of five wool jersey pieces from 1934, comprising two tops, long and short skirts, and a pair of culottes; and Maxwell's "weekend wardrobe" of five tweed and flannel garments. Both were designed to accommodate formal and informal occasions depending on how they were assembled and accessorised. McCardell also became well known for designs such as the Monastic and Popover dresses which were versatile enough to work in multiple contexts from swimsuit cover-ups to party dresses. Other McCardell signatures included ballet slippers (made by Ben Sommers of Capezio) as everyday footwear and functional pockets in skirts and trousers. Dressy garments made from casual fabrics, such as McCardell and Joset Walker's evening dresses and dress-and-coat ensembles made out of cotton, became a key sportswear look. The American couturier Norman Norell declared that McCardell could make a smart dress to wear anywhere out of "five dollars worth of common cotton calico." Other sportswear designs often incorporated elements of sporty informal or casual wear, as exemplified by Clare Potter's evening sweater worn with a long skirt draped like a sidesaddle riding habit.

Alongside Dorothy Shaver, Eleanor Lambert was an important promoter of the American Look and sportswear. As founder of the Council of Fashion Designers of America and creator of New York Fashion Week, Lambert is considered the first fashion publicist. In the summer of 1940, Lambert was hired by the Dress Institute to promote American fashion, leading to newspaper and magazine articles about how New York was replacing Paris as a global fashion leader. In 1940, both Harper's Bazaar and Vogue published issues devoted to American fashion.

Rebecca Arnold and Emily S. Rosenberg have noted how the American look, demonstrated through healthy teeth and the use of affordable, good-quality fashionable clothing to present a neat and practical appearance, despite claims of egalitarianism, was ultimately held up against white standards of beauty. Rosenberg has pointed out a six-page spread in LIFE dated May 21, 1945, which explicitly described girls with an athletic 'American look' of good teeth, good grooming, and good, not-too-masculine, simple, neat attire, as being seen as preferable to girls from England, France, Australia or Polynesia.

=== 1946–1970 ===
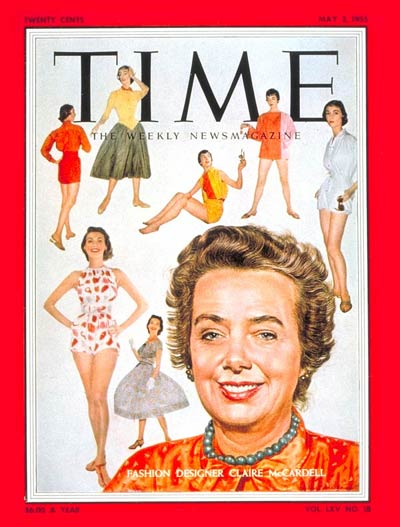
Claire McCardell surrounded by models wearing her designs, 2 May 1955. (TIME)

After the Second World War, the emergence in Paris of the luxurious "New Look" popularised by Christian Dior, with its emphasis on accessorising and femininity, was in direct contrast to the relaxed, easy-wear American look. Sally Kirkland, a fashion editor at Vogue and LIFE, noted that McCardell and others had already been thinking along the lines of longer and fuller skirts and fitted bodices, but that unlike Dior's heavily stiffened and corseted designs, they used bias-cut bodices and lightweight, easy-wear circle or pleated skirts to reproduce the same silhouette. Unlike traditional made-to-measure French couture fashion, designed for specific silhouettes, American sportswear was designed to accommodate a variety of body shapes and enable freedom of movement. With the lifting of fabric rationing and restrictions following the War, American designers were able to use unlimited fabric and the development of permanent pleating meant that pleated dresses and full skirts were easy to look after. In addition to this, American stores had begun to recognise the commercial value of separates, with LIFE reporting in 1949 that separates made up an all-time-high of 30% of clothing sales in the States that Fall.

In the 1950s and 1960s, designers continued to develop the theme of affordable, practical and innovative sportswear, producing clothing that focused on wearability rather than fashion fads, including Anne Fogarty's coat-and-dress sets and dresses made with removable waistcoats to alter their look. The film costume designer Bonnie Cashin, who started producing ready-to-wear clothing in 1949, is considered one of the most influential American sportswear designers. She was known for her extremely practical layered ensembles inspired by ethnographic garments and textiles such as the Japanese kimono and happi, ikats, and the South American poncho. Her designs incorporated leather bindings, pockets with purse clasps, hooded jersey dresses and tops, and industrial zippers and fastenings. She put a brass clip resembling those used on dog leashes, on a long formal skirt so that it could be securely hitched up to enable the wearer to run up and down stairs, and her ponchoes and hoods (which could be rolled down to form elegant cowl-collars) were originally designed for driving on cool mornings. Cashin became one of the first American designers to have an international reputation. Alongside Cashin, Rudi Gernreich emerged in the 1950s as a key name in sportswear design, first becoming known for his swimsuits, but then expanding into geometrically cut, graphic clothes and knitwear that Kirkland described as the epitome of the "new California."

Along with many other designers, Gernreich took advantage of the development in the mid-1950s of upgraded machine-knitting techniques to produce his work. Double knitting (which was developed in Italy) enabled the mass-production of easy-to-wear knitted suits, coats and dresses that retained their shape and became a key American look in the 1960s and '70s. Another knitwear development involved varying the lines of the classic T-shirt so that it could be extended into dress-length versions, long or short sleeves, and other variations, including, by 1960, a sequined long evening version by Kasper for Arnold & Fox. In the 1960s, American sportswear depended on very simple shapes, often made in vivid colours and bold, geometric prints (such as those by Gernreich and Donald Brooks).

Towards the end of the 1960s, many sportswear designers such as Anne Klein and Halston began to enter business independently, rather than relying on the backing of their manufacturers, or working in association with firms and companies.

=== 1970–2000 ===
In a 1974 essay titled "Recession Dressing," the writer Kennedy Fraser noted how Halston's work, particularly his success with making basic garments in luxurious fabrics, was that of an "anti-designer" who liberated American women of fashion from needlessly elaborate, conventional high fashion from high-end establishment American designers. She also singled out Clovis Ruffin and Stephen Burrows. Alongside Calvin Klein, Jhane Barnes, and Ralph Lauren, Martin has described Halston, Ruffin and Burrows as "paragons" of 1970s and early 1980s Seventh Avenue sportswear style.

During the 1970s, Lauren, Calvin Klein and Perry Ellis became particularly known for their sportswear designs, made in all-natural fibres such as wool, combed cotton, and linen, which placed them at the top tier of American fashion design alongside the Anne Klein label (designed by Donna Karan and Louis Dell'Olio). Newsweek in 1975 described Calvin Klein as having styled his clean, casual separates with the authority of a couture designer, and by 1985, Martin described him as "one of the great American stylists" with a solid international reputation and worldwide influence entirely based on his skills as a sportswear designer. The industry empires of Lauren and Calvin Klein would be joined in the mid-1980s by Donna Karan's own-name label and Tommy Hilfiger, each of whom created distinctive wardrobes for the American woman based upon stylish but wearable, comfortable and interchangeable multi-purpose clothes that combined practicability with luxury. These clothes were also designed to have a long, stylish and undated life, rather than to only be fashionable for one season. In 1976, the designer Zoran brought out the first of a number of collections of extremely simple garments made of the finest quality fabrics; garments that barely changed over the years and which became cult objects to his wealthy clientele. In 1993, the fashion journalist Suzy Menkes declared Zoran's less-is-more sportswear prophetic of the early 1990s modernist trend, whilst Zoran stated that the work of Calvin Klein, Karan, and the Anne Klein label epitomised the "comfort, simplicity, and practicality" associated with sportswear. Most early 21st century sportswear design follows in the footsteps of these designers. Other notable sportswear designers of the late 20th century include Norma Kamali, whose 1980s fashionable garments made from sweatshirt fabric were highly influential; Marc Jacobs, whose eponymous label renowned for layered informality in both day and evening wear was founded in 1986, and Isaac Mizrahi, who presented his first collection in 1987.

In the 1970s, Geoffrey Beene, one of the first significant male sportswear designers, incorporated relaxed layering and elements of menswear into his women's clothing, details that continue to widely influence early 21st century industry designers. In 1970, Bill Blass, whose fashion career began in 1946, founded his own company, Bill Blass Limited. Blass's wearable designs were designed to be worn day and night and he was said to have raised American sportswear to the highest possible level. Like Beene, he introduced menswear touches to his sportswear, which was described as clean, modern and impeccable in style. Kirkland commented in 1985 that sportswear designers such as Liz Claiborne and Joan Vass were no longer "borrowing from the boys," but had begun making menswear too. In addition to the high-end names who produced apparel in large quantity, a more personal level of sportswear was offered in the early 1980s by smaller designers such as Mary Jane Marcasiano and Vass, who specialised in hand-knits in wool and cotton. By the mid-1980s, sportswear had become a key part of the international fashion scene, forming a large part of America's contribution to the twice-yearly fashion presentations alongside top-end collections from Paris, Milan and London.

=== 21st century sportswear ===
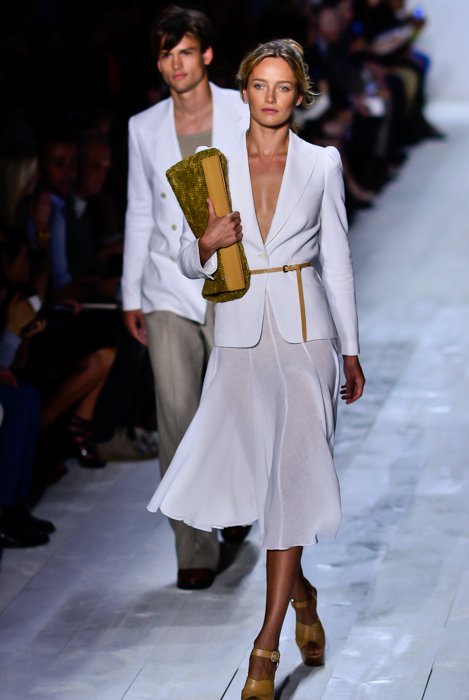
Relaxed easy-wear sportswear by Michael Kors, Spring-Summer 2014.

In 2000, the Lifestyle Monitor, an American trade magazine owned by Cotton Incorporated published that their surveys showed that an average of 64% of women interviewed preferred casual wear, including sportswear as distinct from active wear.

Notable New York sportswear designers of the first decade of the 21st century included Zac Posen, Proenza Schouler, Mary Ping, Derek Lam, and Behnaz Sarafpour, who were all featured in the Sportswear section of the Victoria and Albert Museum's New York Fashion Now exhibition in 2007.

Designers who do not typically work in the sportswear tradition such as Monique Lhuillier sometimes incorporate elements of sportswear and activewear into their work. Lhuillier, mainly known for formal gowns, introduced sporty necklines and aerodynamic elements into her collection for New York Fashion Week, Fall 2011.

In 2012, Tim Gunn noted that the boundaries between activewear and fashion sportswear had become increasingly blurred since the 1980s, with many people choosing to wear hoodies, tracksuits, yoga pants, and other garments explicitly associated with athletic wear as everyday dress.

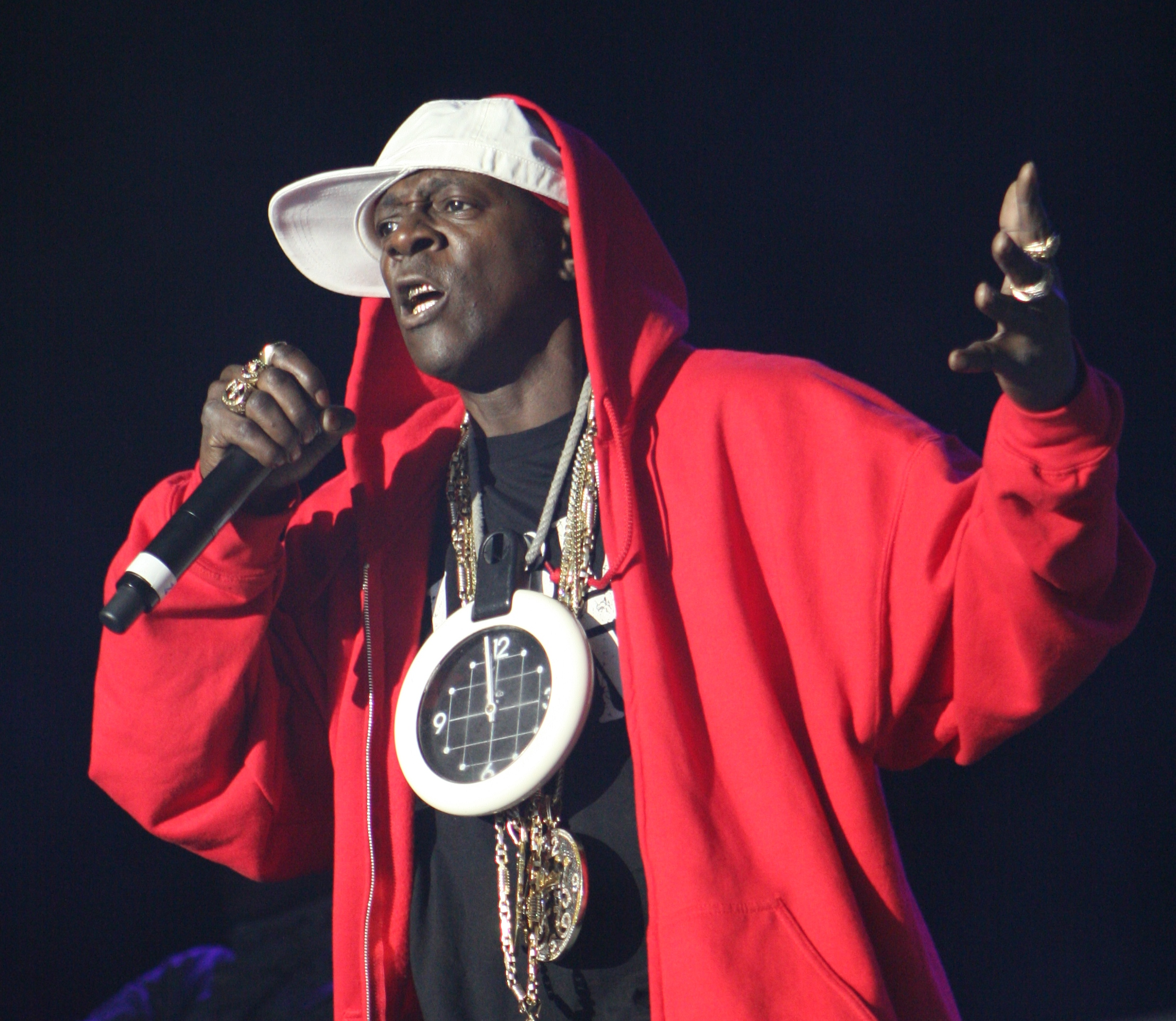
Hoodies and tracksuits became popular items of hip-hop fashion from the 1990s to the 2010s.

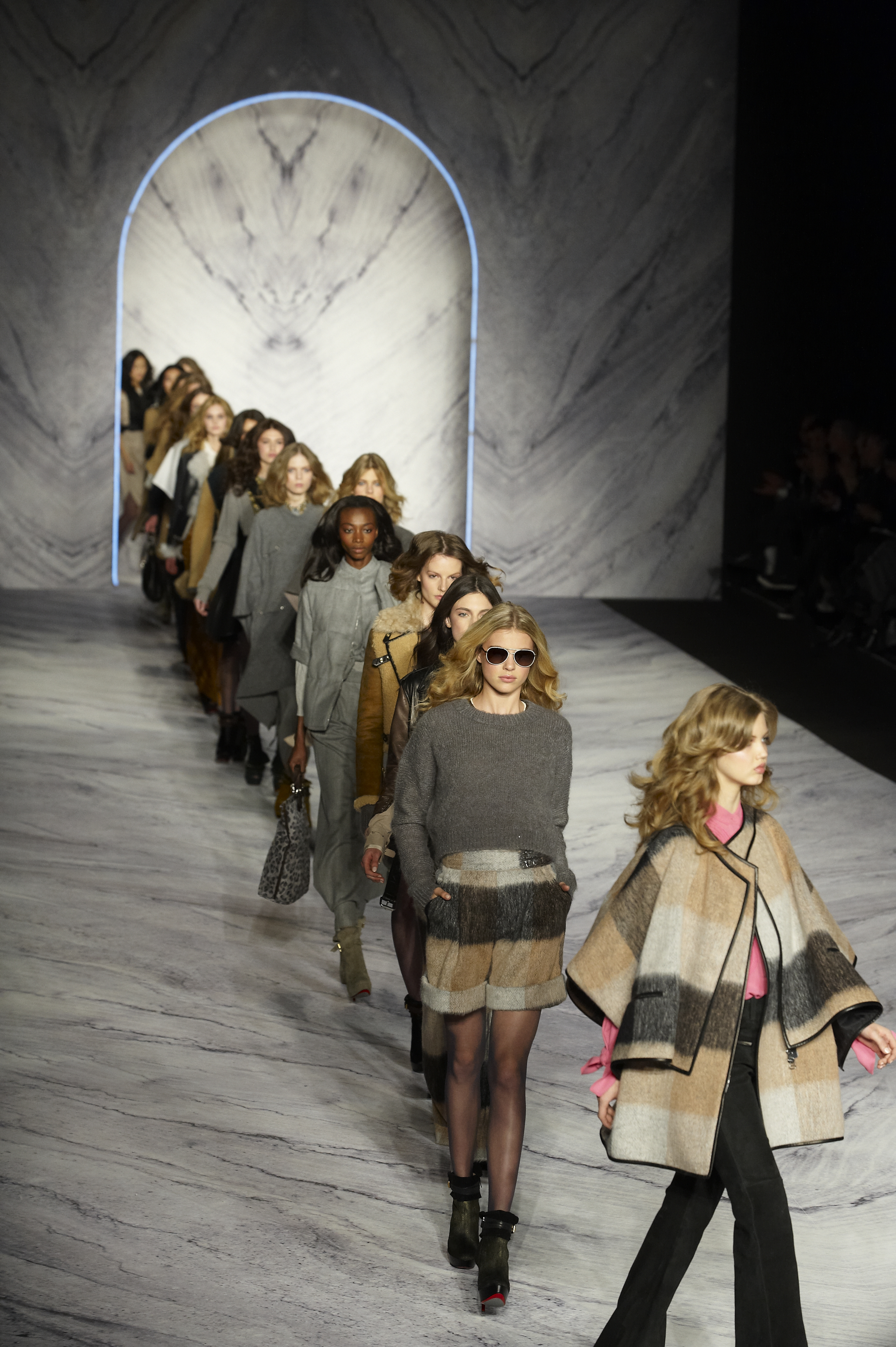
American sportswear for fall-winter 2010 by Phillip Lim, seen at New York Fashion Week

== Outside the United States ==
=== Italy ===
In the late 1940s and 1950s, non-American designers began to pay attention to sportswear, and attempted to produce collections following its principle. French couturiers including Dior and Fath simplified their designs for ready-to-wear production, but at first only the Italian designers understood the sportswear principle. Italy already had a reputation for fine fabrics and excellent workmanship, and the emergence of high quality Italian ready-to-wear that combined this luxury with the casual quality of American sportswear ensured the worldwide success of Italian fashion by the mid-1970s. Italian designers, including Emilio Pucci and Simonetta Visconti, grasped that there was a market for clothing that combined sophistication and comfort. This was a challenge to the American industry. John Fairchild, the outspoken publisher of Women's Wear Daily opined that Krizia, Missoni, and other Italian designers were "the first to make refined sportswear."

Before co-founding the business that later became Missoni with his bride Rosita in 1953, Ottavio Missoni, himself an athlete, and his teammate Giorgio Oberweger had an activewear business in Trieste making wool tracksuits christened Venjulia suits. The success of the Venjulia suits, which took into account the need of athletes for functional, warm garments enabling freedom of movement, led to their being worn by the 1948 Italian Olympics team (which included Missoni himself). In the 1960s Missoni became renowned for their uniquely colored, mix-and-match knitwear separates based upon activewear, which have remained desirable and fashionable well into the 21st century.

The quality of Italian sportswear was recognized early on by Robert Goldworm, an American sportswear designer who in 1947 joined his New York-based family company Goldworm. Through his second company base in Milan, Goldworm became the first American knitwear designer to take advantage of Italian quality and bring it to the New York market. In 1959 Goldworm, in recognition of his active promotion and support of the Italian knitwear industry, was made a Commander of the Order of the Star of Italian Solidarity by the Italian government.

In the 21st century, Italian fashion remains a leading source for sportswear design outside the United States. Narciso Rodriguez, who is known for streamlined and pared down clothing, launched in Milan in 1997, but moved to New York in 2001. Miuccia Prada revived the fortunes of her family company Prada with her top-quality sportswear designs in the 1990s, and continues designing for the firm.

=== France ===
French resort-wear designers, rather than Paris couturiers, were most likely to capture the principle and spirit of sportswear. Richard Martin cited the French Riviera-based design label Tiktiner as an example of French sportswear, noting that their focus on separates, knitwear and basic colours created a specific "Tiktiner look". Tiktiner, founded in the late 1940s by Dina Tiktiner Viterbo, became extremely popular in the United States as well as in Europe. In 1972 a Tiktiner boutique was opened in the London department store Selfridges. Viterbo's husband, Henri, was President of the Fédération Française du Vêtement (French Clothing Federation), which meant that he regularly promoted French fashion abroad, while their eldest daughter, Miquette, an international attorney, had married Mort Schrader, the son and heir of the successful American ready-to-wear fashion manufacturer Abe Schrader. This meant that Miquette was well-positioned to manage Tiktiner's American interests.

=== United Kingdom ===
British sporting attire has had a profound and enduring influence on the sportswear fashion genre. In the late 19th and early 20th centuries, British upper-class leisure pursuits like cricket, tennis, rowing, and sailing gave rise to distinct styles of clothing that combined practicality with understated elegance. Garments like the cricket sweater, tennis blazer and tailored flannel trousers, designed for ease of movement while retaining a formal aesthetic, significantly influenced the American Ivy League fashion scene in the mid-20th century. These, and other sporting elements of British country clothing were subsequently absorbed into the American preppy style of dress.

In the modern era, UK sportswear fashion continues to evolve and remains influential on the global stage. Some traditional British brands, like Lyle & Scott, have refocused their appeal towards youth and urban markets and draw heavily from modern sporting pursuits like skateboarding. Other, contemporary labels, such as A-COLD-WALL* have also achieved international acclaim for their reimagination of sportswear through the lens of modern streetwear, appealing to a new generation.

Successful British sportswear designers include Stella McCartney, known for her jumpsuits and easy-to-wear separates, who designed the athletic uniforms used by Team Great Britain for the 2012 Summer Olympics.

== See also ==
- Casual wear
- Fitness culture
- Athleisure
