= Dorothy Shaver =

American businesswoman and president of Lord & Taylor

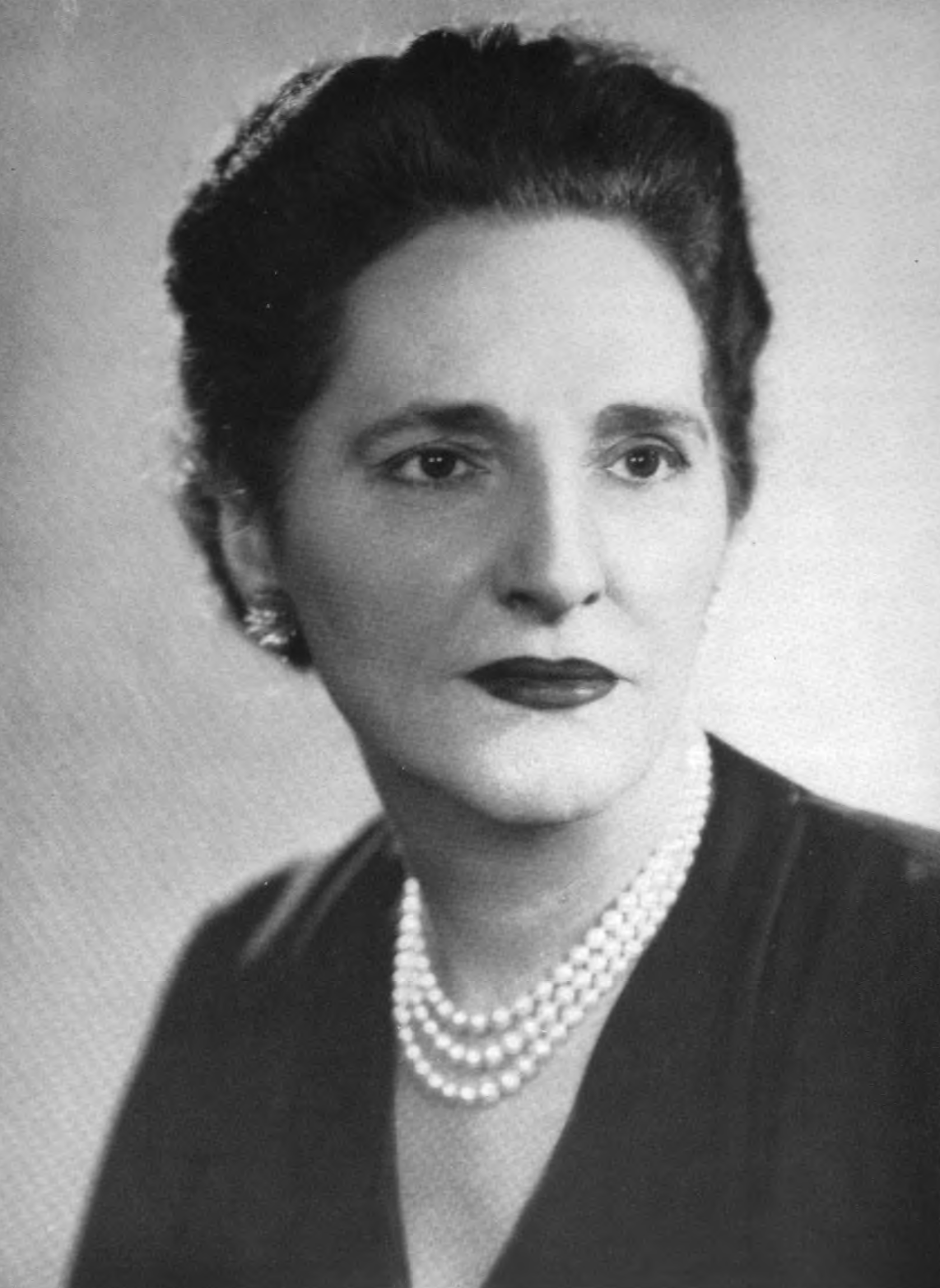
- Born: July 29, 1893; Center Point, Arkansas, U.S.
- Died: June 28, 1959 (aged 65); Hudson, New York, U.S.
- Title: President of Lord & Taylor
- Term: 1945–1959
- Predecessor: Walter Hoving
- Father: James D. Shaver
- Relatives: Robert G. Shaver (grandfather)

Dorothy Shaver (July 29, 1893 – June 28, 1959) was the first woman in the United States to head a multimillion-dollar firm. She was a well known leader of the fashion industry and became president of Lord & Taylor.

== Life ==
Dorothy Shaver was born on July 29, 1893, in Center Point, Arkansas, in Howard County, Arkansas, to Sallie Hunter (née Borden) and James D. Shaver. Her paternal grandfather was Confederate officer Robert G. Shaver. Her father was a lawyer and judge. When she was five years old, the family moved to Mena, Arkansas, and James Shaver opened a law practice. The Shaver House has been listed on the National Register of Historic Places since 1979.

Shaver graduated from high school in 1910 at the age of 17 and she was chosen by her classmates to give the commencement address. She then earned a teaching certificate from the University of Arkansas. Shaver returned to Mena and began teaching seventh grade. Her teaching career ended abruptly in May 1914, when the local board refused to renew the contracts of Shaver and three other single female teachers because they had attended an unchaperoned dance.

In 1916, Shaver and her younger sister Elsie moved to Chicago. While in Chicago, Dorothy studied English literature at the University of Chicago. A year later, the sisters moved to New York City. Elsie began making dolls out of bandage cotton painted in pastel colors. Inspired by the success of the Kewpie Doll, Dorothy began selling five different versions of Elsie's Little Shaver dolls. A Lord & Taylor executive and distant cousin named Samuel Reyburn was impressed by the dolls and helped the sisters set up a workshop producing dolls for the next four years.

Samuel Reyburn hired Dorothy to head comparison shopping bureau at Lord & Taylor in 1921. A year later, she established an interior decorating service at Lord & Taylor. Shaver was elected to the store's board of directors in 1927.

In 1928, Shaver mounted the Exposition of Modern French Decorative Art at Lord & Taylor as a spin-off of the Exposition Internationale des Arts Decoratifs et Industriels Modernes. In addition to furniture and home goods, Shaver's Exposition included paintings by artists such as Picasso, Utrillo, and Derain.

Having made a splash in the media with her French design, Shaver switched her focus to American designers. In 1929, she hired Neysa McNein and other American artists to create fabrics with American themes for Lord & Taylor.

Shaver became one of the founding member of the Fashion Group in February 1931. The Fashion Group was a networking organization for women in the fashion industry. Other founding members included Elizabeth Arden and Helena Rubinstein.

In 1932, Shaver created the American Look program to promote American fashion designers. Between 1932 and 1939, the American Look program featured more than sixty designers, including Clare Potter, Merry Hull, Nettie Rosenstein, and Lilly Dache. The clothing lines were moderately priced, well-constructed sportswear.

Shaver succeeded Walter Hoving as president of Lord & Taylor in 1945. She was given a salary of $110,000. This was the highest salary on record for an American woman at that time, and although it was noted by the author of an article in Life Magazine that the salary was only a quarter of what some "similarly placed male CEOs earned" [comparing it with Thomas J. Watson Sr., President of International Business Machines], the salary was commensurate with what Lord & Taylor paid its top male executives. Walter Hoving, her predecessor, was earning a salary after 10 years as chief executive of $127,015 in 1944.

In 1947, Life Magazine called Shaver "the No. 1 American career woman." By that point, she was managing a $40 million business.

Shaver served as president of Lord & Taylor until her death . (Note: Elsie had Dorothy's gravestone inscribed with a birth year of 1898 to mask her true age.) She died on June 28, 1959, at Hudson Hospital in Hudson, New York. By the time of her death, sales at Lord & Taylor reached $100 million a year.

In 2026, a food hall named after Shaver opened on the ground floor of the Lord & Taylor Building in Midtown Manhattan. The 35,000-square-foot (3,300 m^{2}) food hall, named "Shaver Hall", features 11 food vendors and three restaurants.

== Designers promoted ==
Promoted by Shaver and sold at Lord & Taylor

- Lilly Dache
- Elizabeth Hawes
- Merry Hull
- Muriel King
- Claire McCardell
- Vera Maxwell
- Norman Norell
- Clare Potter
- Nettie Rosenstein
- Pauline Trigere
