= Clovis Ruffin =

American fashion designer

- Born: Christopher Lawrence Tisdall; July 15, 1945; Clovis, New Mexico, U.S.
- Died: April 7, 1992 (aged 46); Manhattan, New York, U.S.
- Occupation: Fashion designer

Clovis Ruffin (July 14, 1945 – April 7, 1992) was an American fashion designer specializing in sportswear, active from 1972 to 1992. In 1973, he became the youngest designer to win a Coty Award.

== Early life and education ==
Ruffin was named after Clovis, New Mexico, where he was born in 1946. He grew up in Egypt and Europe before returning to the US as a teenager. He studied at the High School of Art and Design in Manhattan; Columbia University, and the Sorbonne in Paris.

== Career ==
In 1972 Ruffin held his first significant catwalk presentation, and in 1973, became the youngest designer at that time to win a Coty Award. One of Ruffin's design trademarks was simple T-shirt dresses in clinging fabrics. He also made clothing from terrycloth and regularly used bold stripes in his work. His customer base was identified as young women seeking affordable youthful clothing that was suitable for the office, and he was notable for prominently featuring Black models in his shows. His work represented the American sportswear tradition of relaxed, easy-to-wear day-to-evening clothing that anyone could wear. Richard Martin described Ruffin as one of the "paragons" of 1970s and early 1980s Seventh Avenue sportswear style.

By 1973, the year that he won the Coty Award, Ruffin had sold nearly US$5 million of good-quality, affordable wholesale clothing to retailers around the United States. In 1974, Kennedy Fraser noted that Ruffin's designs in their clean modernity and accessibility were equal to the work of Halston, at that time one of the most successful and highly regarded American designers. In 1981, Ruffin's designs were described as representing "agelessness and classlessness", one of his 40-dollar dresses equally wearable by both a typical young office worker on a tight budget with plastic jewelry, and by the likes of Jacqueline Kennedy Onassis with luxury accessories. By the 1980s, Ruffin was offering taffeta evening dresses costing several hundred dollars apiece alongside more reasonably-priced lounge-wear, pajamas and caftan dresses.

His company, Ruffinwear, was funded by the Kreisler Group from 1973 until shortly before Stuart Kreisler declared bankruptcy in 1979. Ruffin subsequently licensed his work to Boutique Industries and Keyloun.

In 1990, Ruffin designed costumes for Alvin Ailey's dance company, and before his death, was pursuing interior design.

== Personal life and death ==
With his early success as a designer, Ruffin was soon able to afford an apartment in The Ansonia, before moving to a penthouse in Abingdon Square Park, which placed him closer to the New York gay scene. In 1979 he had a brief relationship with the LGBTQ film historian Vito Russo, making a significant impact on Russo's life.

Ruffin died of AIDS complications at the Cabrini Hospice, Manhattan, on April 7, 1992, aged 46. He was survived by his mother, Harriet Wright Ruffin of Manhattan, who in 2005 published her autobiography.
