= Robert Rosencrans =

American television network executive (1927–2016)

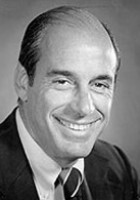
- Born: March 26, 1927; New York City, New York, U.S.
- Died: August 3, 2016 (aged 89); Greenwich, Connecticut, U.S.
- Education: Columbia University
- Employer: Columbia Cable Systems
- Board member of: C-SPAN
- Children: 4

Robert Morris "Bob" Rosencrans (March 26, 1927 – August 3, 2016) was a cable television industry pioneer who helped create C-SPAN, an American public affairs television network. In addition, he helped launch the television networks BET and MSG, a predecessor of the USA Network.

== Early life and education ==
Rosencrans was born on March 26, 1927, in New York City. His parents were Alvin, an Austrian immigrant who imported ornaments for women's hats, and Eva Greene, a Russian immigrant who was a fashion designer for Alvin's sister, Nettie Rosenstein. Rosencrans was raised in Woodmere, New York.

He had plans to attend Dartmouth College until his older brother died in combat during World War II. Rosencrans enlisted and served in the United States Army Air Forces, then earned bachelor's and master's degrees in economics from Columbia University in 1949.

== Career ==
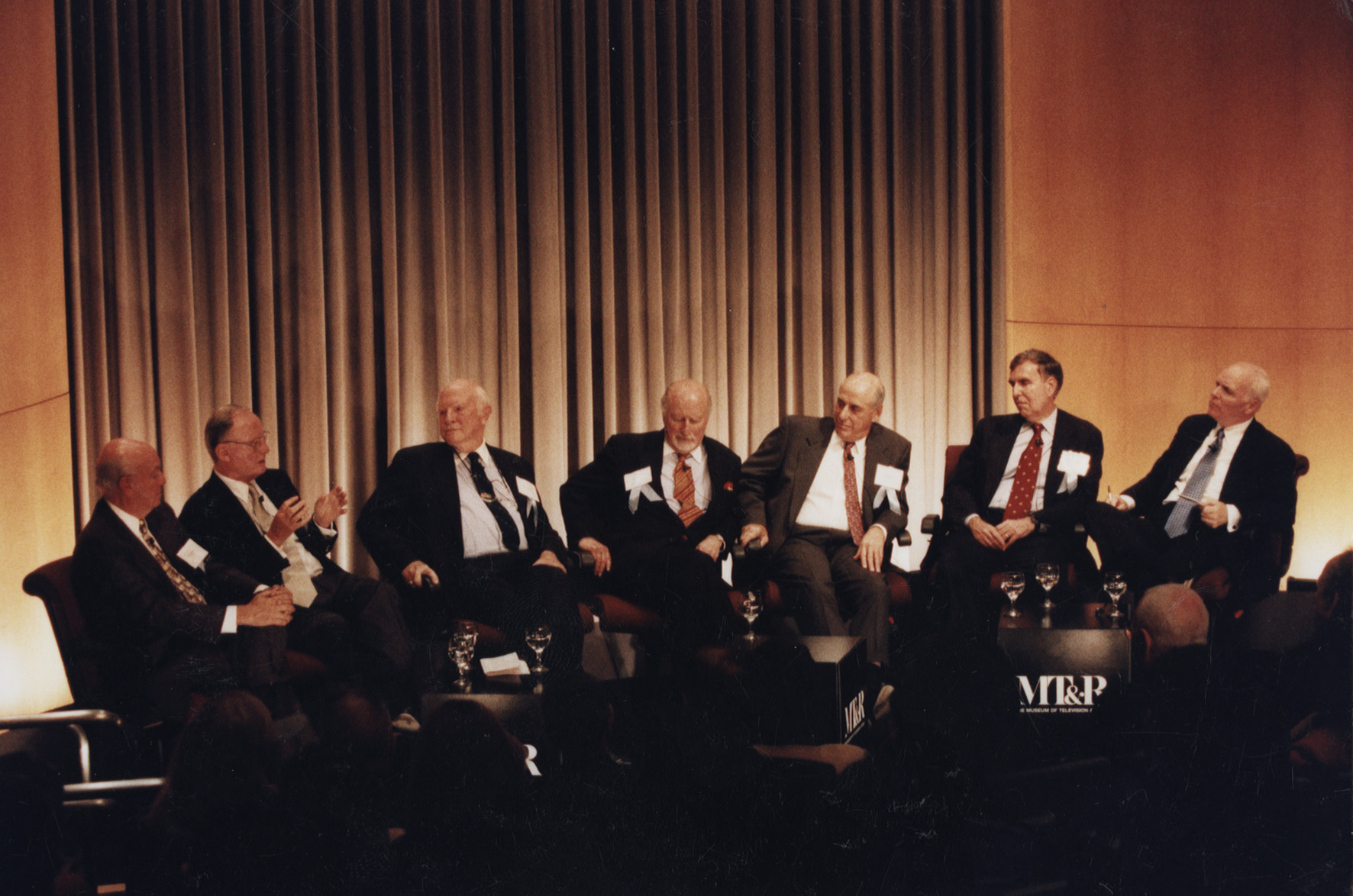
Panelists discussing the first use of a satellite to distribute cable television programming, the 1975 "Thrilla in Manila" boxing match between Muhammad Ali and Joe Frazier. Left to right: Monty Rifkin, Jack Cole, Hubert Schlafly, Sid Topol, Bob Rosencrans, Gerald M. Levin, Brian Lamb.

After several jobs in retailing, Rosencrans joined Box Office Television (BOT), which produced programming for hotels and wanted to offer closed-circuit programming, such as sports games and live theater, to movie theaters. Rosencrans conceived the idea of a cable system after BOT purchased TelePrompTer in 1956 with the goal of expanding its closed-circuit programming. In 1961, he and other investors began acquiring cable systems in smaller towns. In 1975, Rosencrans' Columbia Cable Systems (which later became UA-Columbia Cablevision) invested nearly $100,000 to become the first cable operator to install a satellite receiving station. The company did so in order to broadcast "Thrilla in Manila", the third and final boxing match between Muhammad Ali and Joe Frazier, to its subscribers in Florida.

Rosencrans is credited for persuading Madison Square Garden to launch the television network MSG. He and Kay Koplovitz helped create this as a sports channel, which later expanded its programming to become USA Network, the first basic cable channel distributed via satellite. Rosencrans offered Robert L. Johnson air time on Friday evenings, which led to the creation of BET, a basic cable and satellite television channel targeting African American audiences.

He was an early financial backer and founding board chair of C-SPAN, an American public affairs television network. In 1977, while serving as president of UA-Columbia, Rosencrans and his partner Ken Gunter contributed $25,000 and convinced other industry leaders to contribute an additional $450,000 to launch the network. C-SPAN began broadcasting on March 19, 1979, with additional funding from UA-Columbia and several other cable television companies. Rosencrans served on the C-SPAN board for nearly 40 years and was designated its chairman emeritus until his death.

Rosencrans' role at UA-Columbia was eliminated when the company split in 1984. He started the cable multiple system operator Columbia International, which sold in 1995 for an estimated $600 million.

In 2000, Rosencrans was inducted into the Cable Hall of Fame, which recognizes "ground-breaking leaders who have shaped and advanced" the cable telecommunications industry. The honor was bestowed by The Cable Center, a nonprofit, educational organization serving the industry.

In addition to his work in cable television, Rosencrans was an early investor in PublicAffairs, a publishing company established in 1997 by Peter Osnos. He was also an investor in the video discussion website Bloggingheads.tv in 2007.

== Personal life ==
Rosencrans was Jewish and described by The New York Times as a "political liberal".

As of May 2012, Rosencrans was retired and living in Connecticut. Rosencrans died at a hospital from stroke complications on August 3, 2016, in Greenwich, Connecticut, at the age of 89. He and his wife of 59 years, Marjorie Meyers, had four children.
