= Viterbo (disambiguation) =

Viterbo is a city and comune in Lazio, Italy.

Viterbo may also refer to:

== Places ==
- Viterbo, Caldas, a town in Caldas, Colombia
- Viterbo, Texas, an unincorporated community in Jefferson County, Texas, United States

== People with the surname ==
- Dina Tiktiner Viterbo (1918-2001), French fashion designer
- José Viterbo (born 1962), Portuguese football manager
- Patricia Viterbo (1939–1966), French actress

== Other uses ==
- Viterbo University, a university in La Crosse, Wisconsin, United States
