= Tom Brigance =

American sportswear designer (1913–1990)

- Tom Brigance, c.1951
- Born: Thomas Franklin Brigance; 4 February 1913; Waco, Texas
- Died: 14 October 1990 (aged 77); New York City
- Known for: American sportswear
- Awards: Coty Award, 1953

Thomas Franklin Brigance (February 4, 1913 – October 14, 1990) was a Texan-born New York–based fashion designer noted for his work in sportswear in the 1930s, 1940s and 1950s. As a house designer for Lord & Taylor, Brigance was best known for bathing costumes and play clothes, and for his clever use of flattering details such as pleats and darts. During the 1930s Brigance was a rare example of a male working in the female-dominated world of American sportswear design. In the late 1930s, he was regularly mentioned alongside Clare Potter as a leading name in mid-range priced sportswear. Like Potter, Brigance was skilled at designing smart, fashionable clothing which could easily be mass-produced, making his work attractive to manufacturers as well as to customers. After graduating from the New York School of Fine and Applied Art (later, Parsons School of Design) in 1934, Tom Brigance (1913-1990) became a fashion designer specializing in women's swimwear and sportswear. The collection includes scrapbooks of clippings and photographs of Brigance's designs, sketches, publicity materials, and four original fashion illustrations of Brigance swimwear by Dorothy Hood, produced for Lord & Taylor.

After serving in the Army during the Second World War, Brigance resumed designing for Lord & Taylor and for Charles W. Nudelman; branching out into a wider range of garments, including suits, coats, and formal wear. He was known for his clever use of unusually textured and/or unexpected fabrics, such as a flannel swimsuit, and in 1953, reportedly designed over half of the textiles in his collections himself. In 1953 Brigance was awarded the Coty Award for his designs.

Brigance continued designing during the 1960s and 1970s, focusing on swimwear for various companies. One of his swimsuit designs for Gabar, produced before his retirement in the late 1970s, was still a best-selling design for the company in 1990. He died in New York in 1990.
