= Geissman =

Geissman is a surname. Notable people with the surname include:

- Gladys Geissman (a.k.a. Merry Hull, 1908–1978), American accessory designer
- Grant Geissman (born 1953), American jazz guitarist and composer
