= Omar Kiam =

American fashion designer

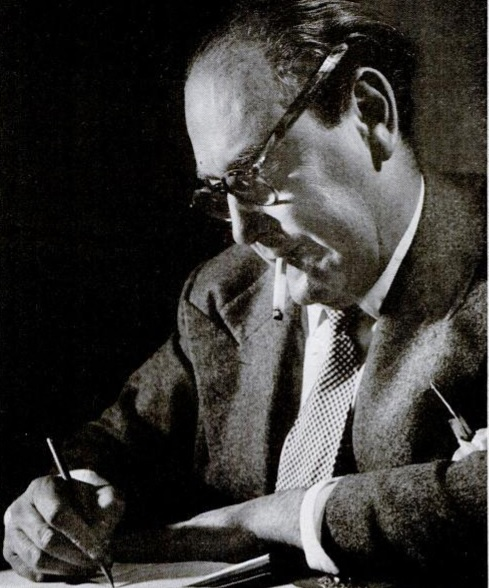
- Omar Kiam in 1944
- Born: Alexander Kiam; July 19, 1894; Monterrey, Mexico.
- Died: March 28, 1954 (aged 59); New York City, U.S.
- Occupations: Costume designer; fashion designer
- Awards: Neiman Marcus Fashion Award, 1941; Coty Award, 1946

Alexander "Omar" Kiam (1894 – 1954) was an American fashion designer and costume designer.

== Early life ==
Born Alexander Kiam in Monterrey, Mexico, to Texan parents. Kiam picked up the nickname "Omar" at Riverview Preparatory School in Poughkeepsie, New York. He later went to the Poughkeepsie Military Academy in New York. His first job as a designer was producing caps for babies for a department store in Houston. Kiam chose to retain his nickname professionally, as he appreciated the link to Omar Khayyám.

== Costume design ==
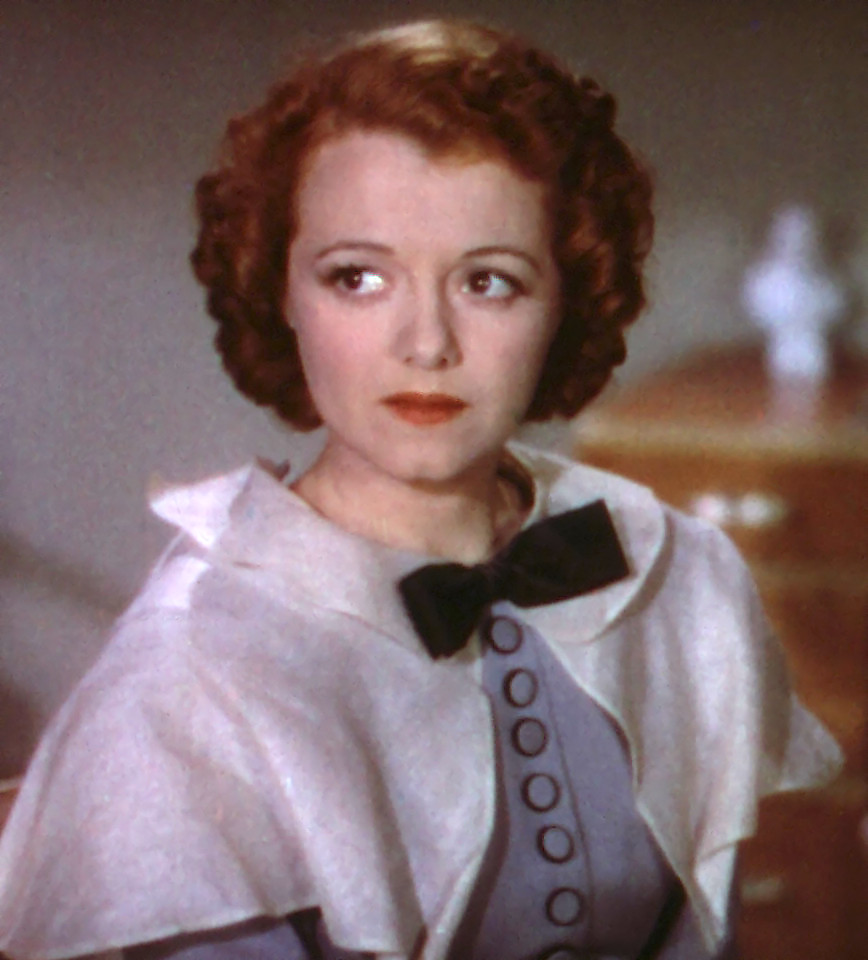
Janet Gaynor, costumed by Kiam, in A Star is Born

Following a stint in Paris as a student, Kiam returned to the United States and opened his studio in New York City, where he produced work for Broadway theatre. Among the theatre productions he costumed were Dinner at Eight, the Robert E. Sherwood play Reunion in Vienna, and the Edward Sheldon and Margaret Ayer Barnes play Dishonored Lady. In 1933 he moved to Hollywood, where he headed the film costume design departments for Sam Goldwyn Productions and United Artists. Before leaving Hollywood in 1939, Kiam also worked for independent producers David O. Selznick and Hal Roach. He also worked with 20th Century Pictures.

One of Kiam's most notable films was the 1937 film A Star is Born, for which he dressed Janet Gaynor. He collaborated with Irene on Algiers.

=== Filmography ===
Omar Kiam costumed the following films:

- A Star is Born
- The Adventures of Marco Polo
- Algiers
- Barbary Coast
- Beloved Enemy
- The Call of the Wild
- Cardinal Richelieu
- Come and Get It
- The Cowboy and the Lady
- The Dark Angel
- Dead End
- Dodsworth
- Folies Bergère de Paris
- The Gay Desperado
- The Goldwyn Follies
- The Hurricane
- Kid Millions
- Les Misérables
- The Mighty Barnum
- One Rainy Afternoon
- Pick a Star
- Splendor
- Stella Dallas
- Strike Me Pink
- These Three
- Topper Takes a Trip
- We Live Again
- The Wedding Night
- Woman Chases Man
- Wuthering Heights
- The Young in Heart
- Zenobia

== Fashion design ==
Although primarily known as a costume designer Kiam had also run a wholesale fashion design business supplying clothing to shops across the United States before he moved to Hollywood.

After leaving Hollywood, in 1941 Kiam became head designer for the Ben Reig fashion label, a company founded in 1929. Also designing costume jewelry for them from 1948, he worked there until his death in 1954.

Kiam won the Neiman Marcus Fashion Award in 1941, and in 1946, won the Coty Award jointly with Vincent Monte-Sano and Clare Potter. During the early 1950s Liz Claiborne worked for Kiam.

Kiam died 28 March 1954 at the Ritz Tower Hotel in New York City, after struggling with a sickness that lasted seven months.

== See also ==
- List of fashion designers
