= La-Jeune Hundley =

American model

- Born: Alexandria, Virginia, US
- Occupation: Model
- Modeling information
- Agency: Grace Del Marco Agency; Eva Burnay

La-Jeune Hundley is an American model.

== Early life ==
Hundley's first name appears in print with various other spellings including LaJeune and LeJeune.

Hundley was raised in Alexandria, Virginia by her mother, Blois Hundley. Blois joined the NAACP and joined a lawsuit suing the local school district, where she worked as a cook, to integrate. She was fired by the segregationist superintendent, Thomas Chambliss "T.C." Williams. The case went to the United States Court of Appeals for the Fourth Circuit, and Blois' firing was referred for a civil rights investigation at the US Department of Justice. In both cases, the Hundleys would prevail, but not before the family had relocated to Washington D.C..

== Career ==
Hundley considered a nursing career but was told she was too young. She enrolled in charm school with Ophelia Devore and started modelling for her agency, Grace Del Marco, instead.

Hundley won a title at New York's Miss American Beauty pageant, which enabled her to travel with sponsorship to the 1960 Cannes Film Festival where she became the second American, and second Black woman to win the title of "Miss Festival".

In October, 1960, Hundley was photographed for the cover of Ebony. In November, 1960, Hundley was the cover girl for Jet and was celebrated in an internal article for her work at the Ebony Fashion Fair.

She walked runways for Christian Dior, Jean Dessès and Jacques Tiffeau and worked as a public relations representative for Ballantine. In September 1963, the New York Times reported that Hundley had appeared in the October 1, 1962 issue of Vogue magazine, becoming the first Black model "cracking the highest rung of the white fashion market".

Hundley went on to appear on NBC, modelling prizes on Say When!! and appearing on other Goodson-Todman programs.
