= Jon Whitcomb =

American illustrator

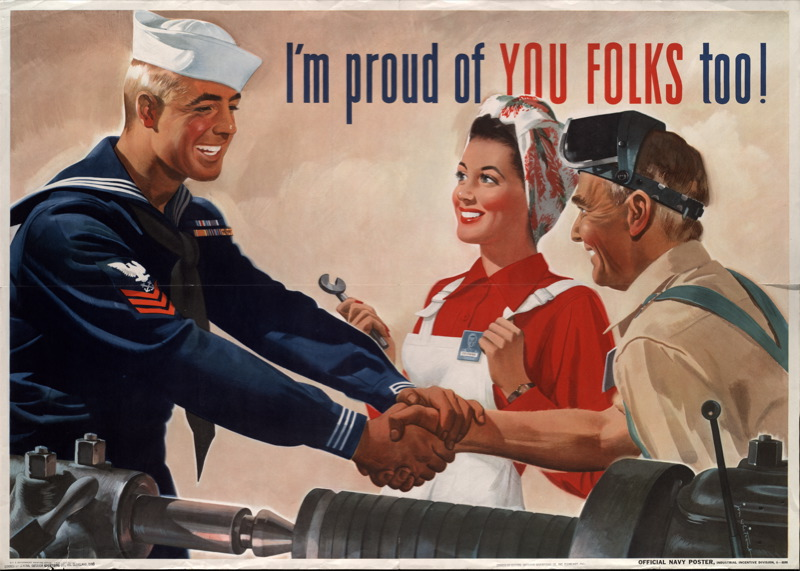
"I'm Proud of You Folks Too!", US Navy poster, 1944

Jon Whitcomb (1906–1988) was an American illustrator. He was well known for his pictures of glamorous young women. He was born in Weatherford, Oklahoma and grew up in Manitowoc, Wisconsin. He attended Ohio Wesleyan University and graduated from Ohio State University with a major in English. He is the brother of fashion designer and inventor Merry Hull.

Whitcomb started drawing illustrations for student publications while a student at Ohio State, and worked summers painting posters for a theater in Cleveland, Ohio. After he graduated, Jon found work making travel and theater posters and advertising illustrations. In 1934, he moved to New York City and joined with Al Cooper to found the Cooper Studio. Whitcomb was a pioneer in the switch from oil to gouache for illustrations. The different qualities of gouache compared to oil led to changes in the design of Whitcomb's illustrations. He zoomed in on people, usually pretty, young city women, and reduced the background to simple design elements. His new style of illustrations soon appeared in Collier's Weekly, Good Housekeeping and other magazines.

During World War II, Whitcomb was commissioned a Lieutenant, Junior Grade in the United States Navy. After a variety of duties, he was assigned as a combat artist for the invasions of Tinian, Saipan, and Peleliu.

After the war, Whitcomb produced a series of articles and sketches about Hollywood stars for Cosmopolitan, called "On Location with Jon Whitcomb". He continued to produce story illustrations and covers for magazines, including McCall's and Playboy. He wrote some short stories, two children's books, Coco and Pom Pom's Christmas, and a book on glamour, All About Girls. He was one of the founding faculty of the Famous Artists School.

Whitcomb was in a relationship with Bob Young, who became a manager for William Bast.
