= Jane Régny =

Fashion designer (sportswear)

Jane Régny was the pseudonym of the French fashion designer Madame Balouzet Tillard de Tigny. She and her husband launched the Jane Régny fashion house, which was active during the 1920s and 1930s and notably specialised in fashionable sports clothing. Before launching her fashion business, Régny had been a renowned tennis player, who, like Suzanne Lenglen, entered the world of fashion design. While other Paris designers such as Jean Patou (whose sportswear department was directed by Lenglen) and Coco Chanel offered sporty attire as part of their collections, Régny was unusual in that sportswear was her primary focus. Along with Amy Linker and Jenny, Régny was one of the few French couturiers whose reputation was based on her sporty clothing, rather than other modes. She worked out of her own salon at 11, Rue La Boétie. As an experienced sportswoman and keen golfer, Régny was able to design garments that would meet the requirements of her clientele. She was assisted by her husband, who helped her develop a signature textile print for Alcot Fabrics in 1928.
