= Monte-Sano & Pruzan =

American fashion designers

Monte-Sano & Pruzan was a highly regarded New York fashion house specialising in women's tailoring, founded in 1915 by Vincent Monte-Sano senior, who was later joined by Max Pruzan. The company was liquidated in 1969.

== Company history ==
Monte-Sano was founded in 1915 by Vincent Monte-Sano sr. as a women's custom tailoring establishment. Although the Fashion Institute of Technology states that Pruzan joined the house in the 1950s, at which point it became "Monte-Sano & Pruzan," one source suggests that Monte-Sano and Pruzan co-founded in 1924, and a number of 1940s articles indicate that the firm was widely known and advertised as Monte-Sano & Pruzan well before the 1950s.

In the 1940s the firm became a ready-to-wear house supplying department stores such as Bonwit Teller and Saks Fifth Avenue, although it retained a reputation for superior quality and hand-finishing. Their collections were notable events in the American fashion world. A July 1947 show, falling at the end of the 9th New York press week, was described as "well worth waiting for," and reinvigorating the exhausted journalists with new enthusiasm. Seen as particularly significant was the use of draping to define silhouette, rather than padding. In 1966, Monte-Sano and Pruzan were still described as a "renowned" firm.

Monte-Sano Sr. died before 1960. At this time, a guest column by Monte-Sano junior and Pruzan for The Philadelphia Inquirer reported that Monte-Sano's son, also called Vincent, had taken over his father's duties. The junior Monte-Sano was also a talented fashion designer who had been associated with the firm since at least 1940, having established his own business on 1 January 1939. Pruzan retired in 1966, and the firm Monte-Sano & Pruzan was liquidated in 1969. The firm's archives from 1926-1968 are held by the Fashion Institute of Technology.

Monte-Sano Jr. acted as a spokesman for the fashion industry throughout the 1960s and by 1971 had become President of the New York Couture Business Council, an organization which promoted the American fashion industry. In 1975 it was noted that Monte-Sano junior ran two companies specialising in coats and raincoats, called 'Main Street' and 'Bond Street.'

== Awards ==
Along with Clare Potter and Omar Kiam Monte-Sano jointly won the Coty Award in 1946. The Coty jury, chaired that year by Wilhela Cushman of Ladies' Home Journal, cited Monte-Sano's dress-like (rather than tailored) coats and suits as of particular significance, noting their use of white wool and officer styling. Monte-Sano also won the Neiman Marcus Fashion Award in 1952, and the Silk Salute Award in 1954.

In 1952, the firm took on a French emigre, Jacques Tiffeau as a pattern-cutter while financing his evening tuition. Tiffeau eventually became chief stylist for Monte-Sano & Pruzan, and in 1958, he and Pruzan's daughter Beverley Busch launched a parallel fashion label, Tiffeau & Busch. Tiffeau went on to win several awards whilst working for both fashion houses concurrently, including a Coty Award in 1960, a 1962 Cotton Fashion Award, and the 1964 International Designers Award, along with his own Neiman Marcus Fashion Award in 1966.
