= Judge Benjamin Shaver House =

Historic house in Arkansas, United States

- U.S. National Register of Historic Places
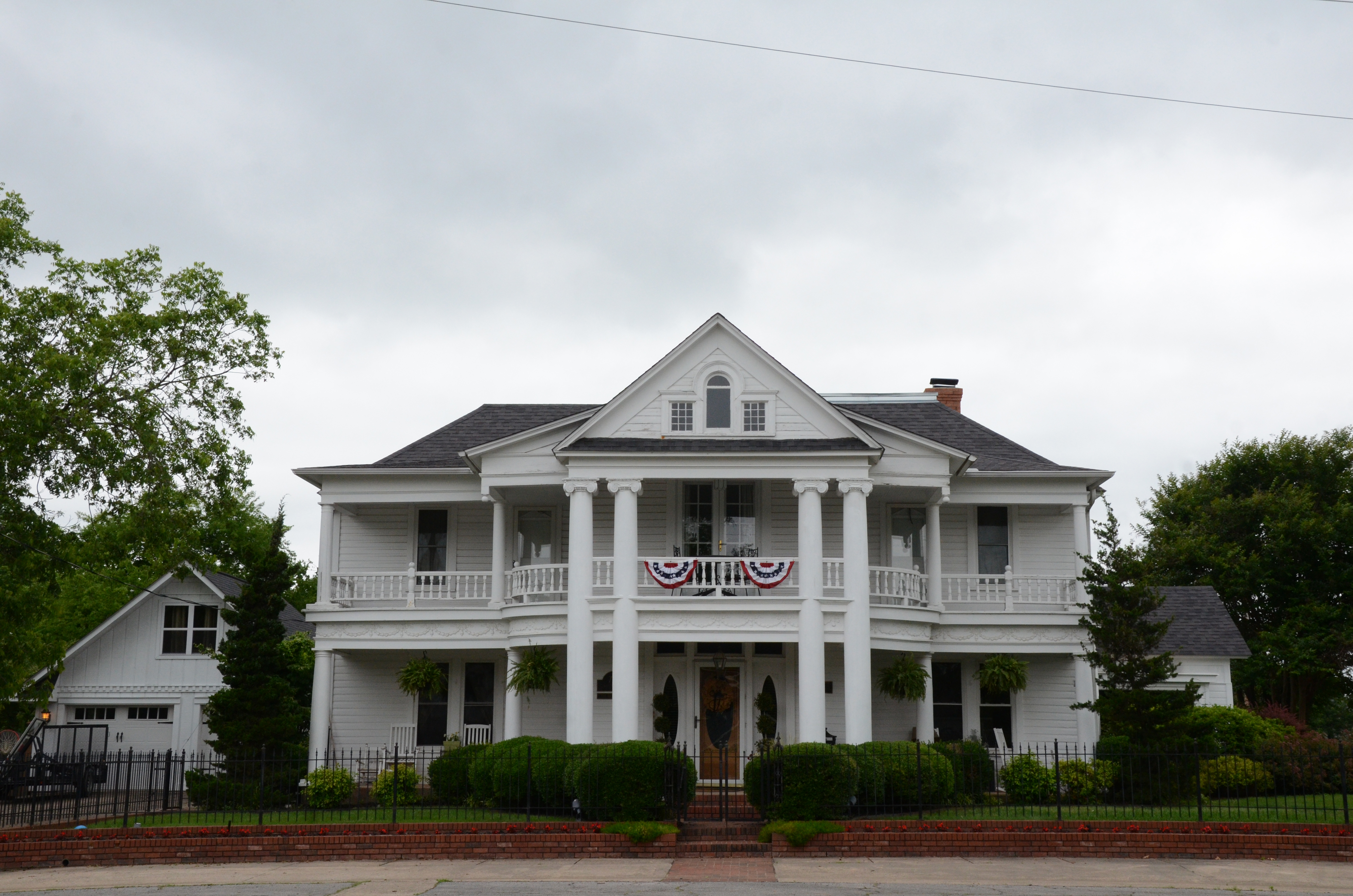

- Location within Arkansas Location within the United States
- Location: 701 12th St., Mena, Arkansas
- Coordinates: 34°35′0″N 94°14′41″W
- Area: less than one acre
- Built: 1896
- Architectural style: Colonial Revival
- NRHP reference No.: 79003431
- Added to NRHP: December 6, 1979

The Judge Benjamin Shaver House is a historic house at 701 12th Street in Mena, Arkansas. It is a 2 1/2-story wood-frame structure, with a hip roof that projects over a two-story porch. There are further stepped projectings beyond this, culminating in an gable section supported by Ionic columns, with a Palladian window in the pedimented gable end. The house was built in 1896, two years after Mena was incorporated by Benjamin Shaver, a prominent local lawyer and judge. The building is further notable for its association with his daughter Dorothy, who parlayed an early career as a dollmaker into becoming CEO of Lord & Taylor.

The house was listed on the National Register of Historic Places in 1979.

== See also ==
- National Register of Historic Places listings in Polk County, Arkansas
