= Eva Rosencrans =

American fashion designer (1901–1994)

Eva Rosencrans, c.1940

Eva Rosencrans (1901–1994) was an American fashion designer of Russian descent who worked mainly for her sister-in-law Nettie Rosenstein as a business partner and head designer. She designed Mamie Eisenhower's inauguration gown.

== Early life ==
Born Eva Greene in Russia, she came to Manhattan as an infant with her family. She was supported by a philanthropic group called Manhattan Trade which supported children from low-income families to pursue trades. She attended the Manhattan Trade School for Girls from 1914 to 1915, where she had consistently good grades, and won first prize for her self-made graduation dress. Aged 14, the school placed her with a local dressmaker's, where she worked for a year before leaving in 1916 to work for the then up-and-coming Nettie Rosenstein.

== Nettie Rosenstein ==
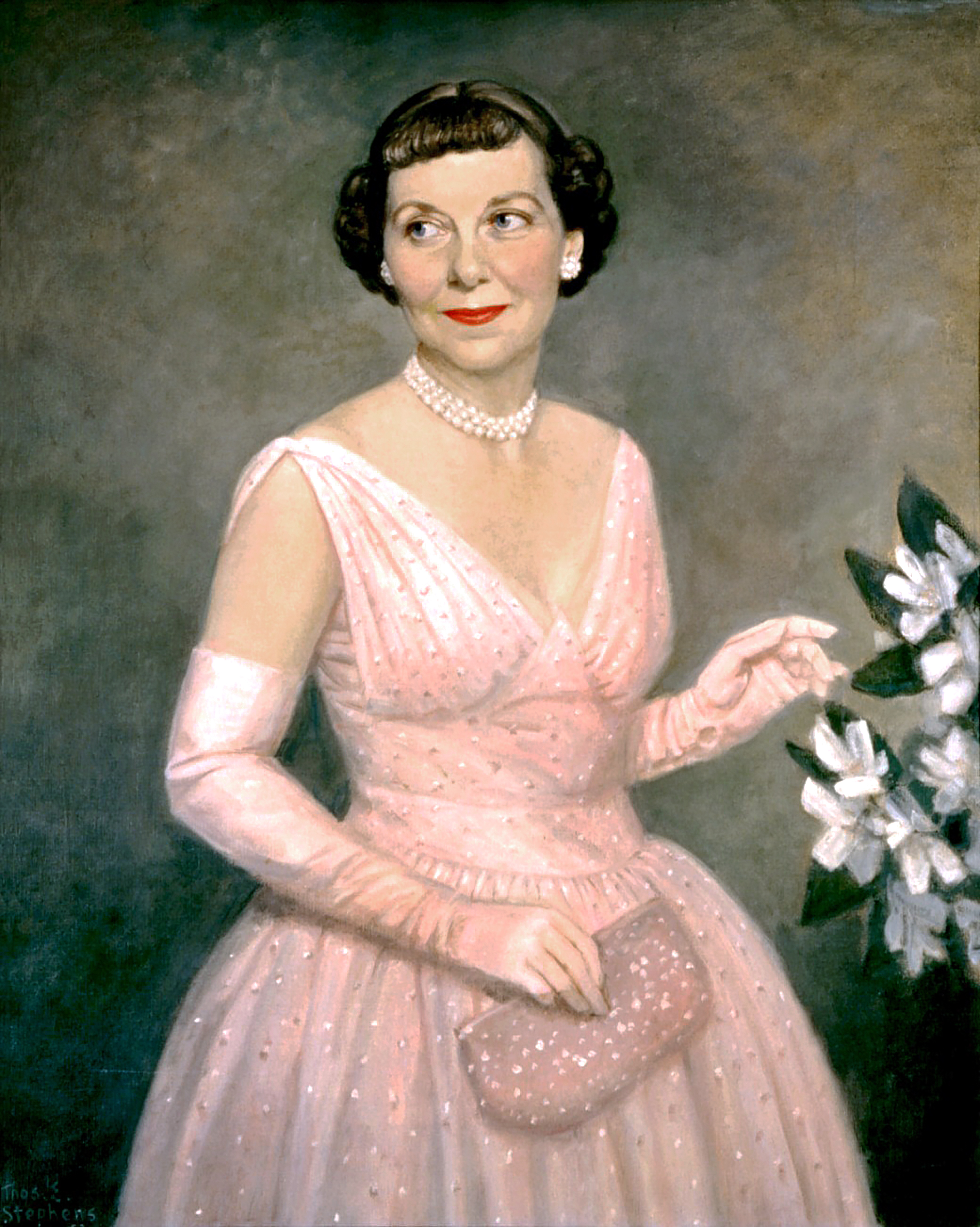
Mamie Eisenhower wearing her 1953 Inaugural ballgown designed by Rosencrans for Nettie Rosenstein

In 1922, Eva married Rosenstein's brother, Alvin Rosencrans. In 1928, Nettie and her husband decided to retire, but following the Wall Street crash of 1929 which almost wiped out the Rosensteins' fortune, Nettie Rosenstein decided to relaunch again. At this time, she insisted on her sister-in-law becoming her associate designer and one of her two business partners, alongside a man called Charles Gumprecht. Rosencrans was given a 30% stake and her own designing room, and she and Nettie shared designing responsibilities, which increasingly became more and more Rosencrans' responsibility as Rosenstein focused on the business of managing a highly successful fashion house that was worth over a million dollars by 1937.

In 1950, Mamie Eisenhower came to Nettie Rosenstein, where she was personally dealt with by Rosencrans, and became a good friend and regular client, having both her 1953 and 1957 inauguration gowns created by Rosencrans. Eva Rosencrans was happy to allow her sister-in-law to take credit for the designs. However, she would increasingly be acknowledged as a designer for Nettie Rosenstein from this point onward. In 1953 the journalist Phyllis Battelle acknowledged that Rosenstein did only half the designing for her brand herself, and that she was aided by Rosencrans. By 1959, Nettie Rosenstein designs were increasingly acknowledged as being by Rosencrans for the label. However, in 1961, Rosenstein would make the decision to stop offering clothing altogether, and instead focus upon jewelry, perfume and accessories.

== Later life and death ==
After her sister-in-law ceased dress design, in 1961, Rosencrans moved on to Ben Reig, where, for the first time, she received consistent name credit for her designs. In 1968, the same year that Reig died, Rosencrans became a teacher at the Fashion Institute of Technology for two years before retiring.

She spent the rest of her life in New York where she died in 1994. One of her sons was the cable television pioneer Robert Rosencrans.
