= Jacques Tiffeau =

French fashion designer (1894–1954)

- Born: October 11, 1928; Loire Valley, France
- Died: February 29, 1988 (aged 59); Paris, France
- Occupation: Fashion designer
- Known for: Miniskirts
- Awards: Coty Fashion Critics Award 1960, 1964; Neiman Marcus Fashion Award 1966

Jacques Tiffeau (October 11, 1928 – February 29, 1988) was a French fashion designer.

He was grew up on a farm in Chenevelles, a town in the Loire Valley of France. He left at age 16 for Paris where he trained as an apprentice in men's tailoring. He served in the French Air and Space Force and did some time in a military prison for taking leave without permission.

In 1952, Tiffeau joined Monte-Sano & Pruzan, a New York City fashion house, as a pattern-cutter while financing his evening tuition.

Tiffeau eventually became chief stylist for the house, and in 1958, he and Beverley Busch launched a parallel fashion label, Tiffeau & Busch. He found success by championing the miniskirt and became famous in his own right as a "celebrity designer". In 1964 he was questioned about the length of skirts he designed as being three inches above the knee he explained that "...American women have beautiful legs and beautiful knees." Tiffeau instituted changes that became commonplace in the fashion industry. He played pop music at his runway shows, showed each look with a fast pace, and was one of the first designers to hire Black models, including Renee Hunter, Pat Cleveland, and La-Jeune Hundley.

Tiffeau went won several awards whilst working for both fashion houses concurrently, including a two Coty Awards, a 1962 Cotton Fashion Award, and the 1964 International Designers Award, and a Neiman Marcus Fashion Award in 1966.

Tiffeau later worked for Yves Saint Laurent until 1975. In his later years he taught fashion design at the Institut de la Mode in Paris.

Tiffeau lived as an openly gay man.
