= Emily Wilkens =

American childrenswear fashion designer (1917–2000)

- Wilkens in her own designs, 1948
- Born: 1917; Hartford, Connecticut, U.S.
- Died: December 2, 2000 (aged 82–83); Bronx, New York City, U.S.
- Education: Pratt Institute
- Known for: Teenage and children's fashions
- Awards: 1945 Neiman Marcus Fashion Award; 1945 Coty Award

Emily Wilkens (1917 – December 2, 2000) was an American fashion designer specializing in children's wear. She won both the Neiman Marcus Fashion Award and the Coty Award for her work, which was considered groundbreaking for properly taking note of the requirements of teenage dressing, and not simply offering miniature grown-up garments. She was also an author, writing a number of books on self care and style, and during the late 1960s and early 1970s, became a beauty journalist, writing an advice column.

== Early life ==
Born in Hartford, Connecticut, Emily Wilkens graduated from the Pratt Institute in 1938. She put her studies of fashion illustration to use as a sketcher for newspaper advertisements.

In 1947 she married Irving L. Levey, a judge.

== As fashion designer ==
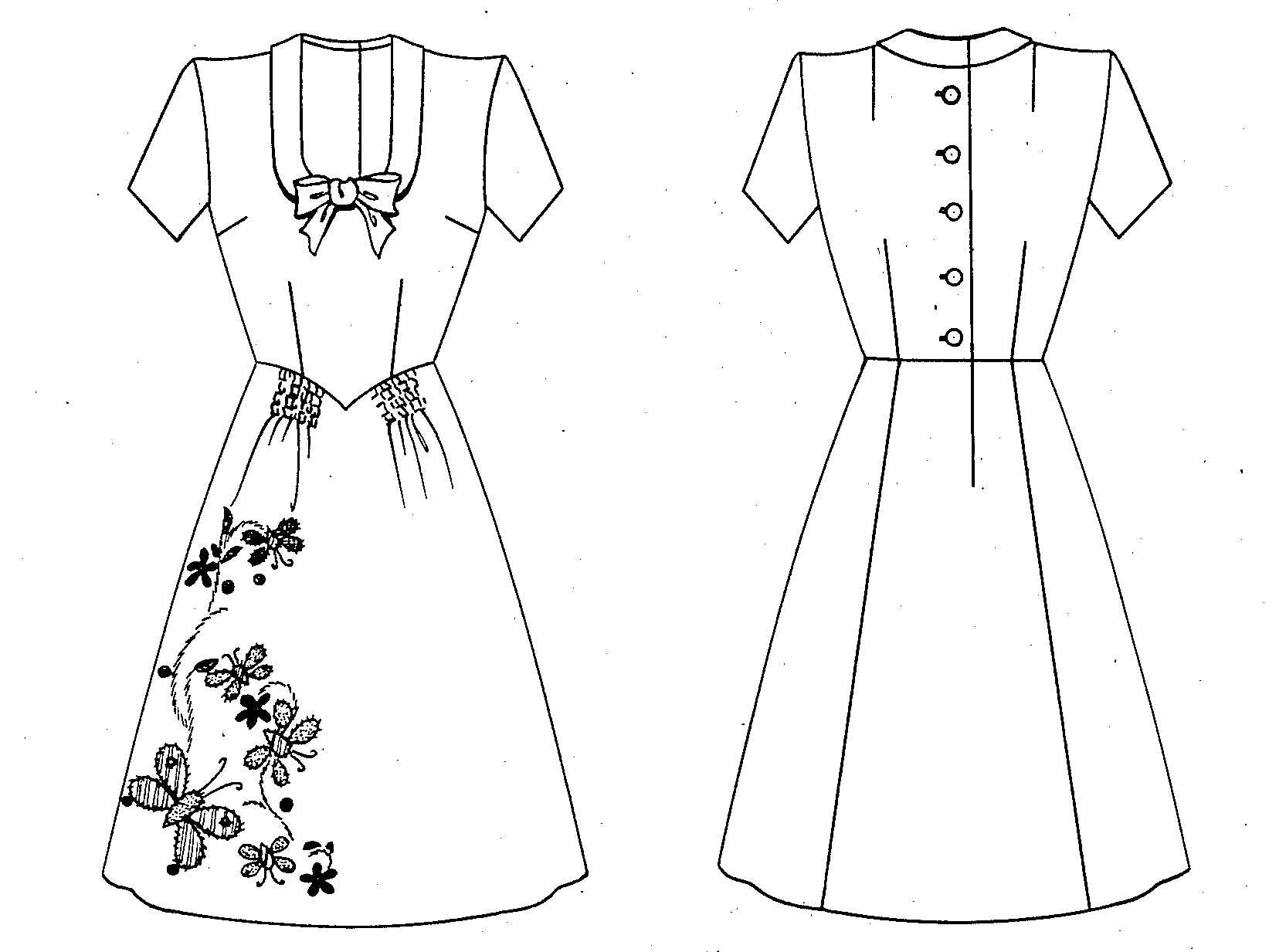
1944 dress with smocking and flower and butterfly embroidery.

Wilkens was on holiday in Hollywood in the early 1940s when she was mistakenly declared to be a children's fashion designer at a party. This led to her receiving a commission to design film costumes for child actress Ann Todd, and to create outfits for children including the offspring of stars such as Gracie Allen and Jack Benny.

Unlike other designers working in the field, Wilkens designed clothes particularly for young girls and teenagers, rather than making miniature versions of their mothers' garments. Realizing that children grew quickly, she made garments that adjusted to accommodate changes in the adolescent figure, whilst maintaining an age-appropriate appearance. Among her signature designs were little black dresses for young girls, which, with bright accessories and details, allowed the wearer to have a "grown up" dress whilst avoiding an austere appearance. The fashion publicist Eleanor Lambert credited her with recognizing an untapped market, and the fashion historian Richard Martin stated that Wilkens "invented the American teenager" long before rock and roll and James Dean consolidated the concept. By 1947, she was said to have served over eight million customers.

Wilken's designs were inspired by a wide range of sources, including Thomas Gainsborough's paintings, Russian folk dress, and nineteenth century fashion.

Awards

Soon after she started in the early 1940s, in 1945, Wilkens won both the Coty Award and the Neiman Marcus Fashion Award. Coty Award publicity at the time praised Wilkens for producing clothing that gave young girls what they wished for, whilst also pleasing their mothers.

== As author ==
In 1948 Wilkens published her first book, Here's Looking at You: The Modern Slant on Smartness for the Junior Miss. She went on to write four other titles along similar themes of personal style, beauty tips, and grooming. These included:

- A New You: The Art of Good Grooming. G. P. Putnam's Sons. 1965. ISBN 0399201769.
- More secrets from the super spas. New York: Dembner Books. 1983. ISBN 0934878250.

During the 1960s and early 1970s Wilkens wrote an advice column on beauty and personal care, called "A New You" after her 1965 book, and distributed by King Features Syndicate.

== Later life and death ==
Between 1966 and 1976 Wilkens was a trustee of the Fashion Institute of Technology in New York. She died at the age of 83 in a retirement home in Riverdale, Bronx on December 2, 2000. She had been diagnosed with dementia nine years earlier, and moved there in 1991. She was survived by her daughter and son, and five grandchildren.
