= Tiktiner =

Fashion business based in the French Riviera (1918-2001)

J. Tiktiner (pronounced TICK-ta-neer) was a family-owned and run fashion business based in the French Riviera.

The company was founded by Dina Tiktiner Viterbo (1918-2001) in Nice in 1948-49, using her maiden name. She ran the business along with her husband Henri Viterbo (1920-2008) and their three daughters, Miquette, Vivian and Daisy. Each family member had a different responsibility in the business, with Dina and Vivian acting as the designers for the brand, developing the vibrant colours and prints intended to echo the themes of the Côte d'Azur as well as creating the garments and accessories. As President of the Fédération Française du Vêtement (French Clothing Federation), Henri Viterbo regularly promoted French fashion abroad (including Tiktiner) and also took responsibility for Tiktiner's business dealings. The youngest daughter, Daisy, acted as a technician for the firm, while the eldest daughter, Miquette, was an international attorney who managed the American interests. Miquette's husband was Mort Schrader, son of the successful American ready-to-wear fashion manufacturer Abe Schrader, and by 1984, she had become the president of Tiktiner.

By 1957, Tiktiner was being noticed for its skimpy swimwear designs, particularly string bikinis, and were described as a leading pacesetter the following year. They did not only design swimwear and warm-weather resort wear, but provided layered knits, coats, and après-ski looks appropriate for colder weather. in 1968 the label was highly regarded for its "well-bred taste", high quality designs and construction, and swimsuit cover-ups that doubled as dresses for town wear. In 1972, Tiktiner was so highly regarded as the "crème de la crème of cruisewear" that the London department store Selfridges opened a boutique in the French section of their establishment exclusively dedicated to selling Tiktiner designs. In 1975, it was noted that Tiktiner signature designs included two- and three-piece coordinated ensembles, and that the clothes were considered high quality and had couture-level pricing that reflected this. In 1980, Dina Viterbo continued being recognised for her skill with designing separates for sportswear, such as jackets and skirts that could be worn together or separately to suit a wide range of occasions. This focus on tailored sportswear separates, knitwear and basic colours was summarised by Richard Martin as the "Tiktiner look" in 2002.
