= Clare Potter =

American fashion designer

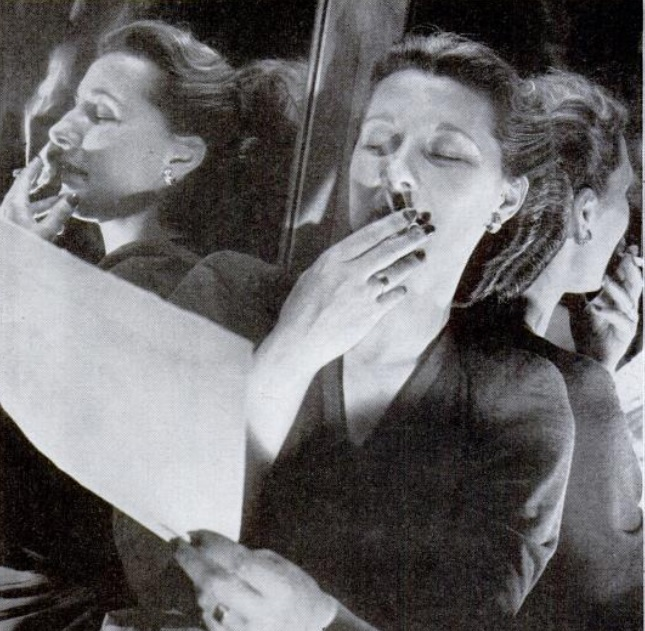
- Potter in 1944
- Born: Clare Meyer; July 7, 1903; Jersey City, New Jersey
- Died: January 5, 1999 (aged 95); Fort Ann, New York
- Education: Art Students League of New York and Pratt Institute of Design
- Awards: 1937 Lord and Taylor Women's Sportswear Award, 1939 Neiman Marcus Fashion Award, 1946 Coty Award

Clare Potter was a fashion designer who was born in Jersey City, New Jersey in 1903. (Note: In 1998 the Metropolitan Museum of Art published alternative dates of 1892-1974, which are still published on their database. However, their curator, Richard Martin, who wrote the 1998 book, subsequently spoke about Potter for her 1999 obituary, confirming that the earlier published dates were erroneous.) In the 1930s she was one of the first American fashion designers to be promoted as an individual design talent. Working under her elided name Clarepotter, she has been credited as one of the inventors of American sportswear. Based in Manhattan, she continued designing through the 1940s and 1950s. Her clothes were renowned for being elegant, but easy-to-wear and relaxed, and for their distinctive use of colour. She founded a ready-to-wear fashion company in Manhattan named Timbertop in 1948, and in the 1960s she also established a wholesale company to manufacture fashions. Potter was one of the 17 women gathered together by Edna Woolman Chase, editor-in-chief of Vogue to form the Fashion Group International, Inc., in 1928.

== Early life and education ==
Born Clare Meyer in Jersey City, just across the Hudson River from Manhattan, she studied at the Art Students League of New York and began her studies at the Pratt Institute of Design in fine arts. After seeing clothes that Potter designed and made for herself, the director of the Pratt Institute recommended that she study costume design.

In 1925, before her graduation, Potter left Pratt to work for Edward L. Mayer, a wholesale dress manufacturer in Manhattan, where she spent three years developing her skills and designing mid-market sportswear.

== Career ==
Following a six-month hiatus in Mexico, Potter returned to Manhattan in 1930 and gained employment with the ready-to-wear firm of Charles W. Nudelman Inc. on Seventh Avenue, which specialized in affordable fashion.

Unusually, at a time when designers for large companies were not acknowledged by name, Potter was promoted as a named designer by Dorothy Shaver, then vice-president of Lord & Taylor department store. Potter was one of the first American designers to achieve such name recognition.

In 1936, Potter was featured alongside Elizabeth Hawes and Muriel King in the second Lord & Taylor "American Look" promotion, which championed home-grown American design talent. She was awarded the first Lord & Taylor Design Award in 1938 for distinguished designing in the field of sportswear for women.

Potter was a keen sportswoman who particularly enjoyed horseback riding. She designed for women like herself, saying in 1948:

Large numbers of American women want clothes that are refined. I aim to give them in a medium-priced, ready-to-wear costume what they would find in custom-made styles.

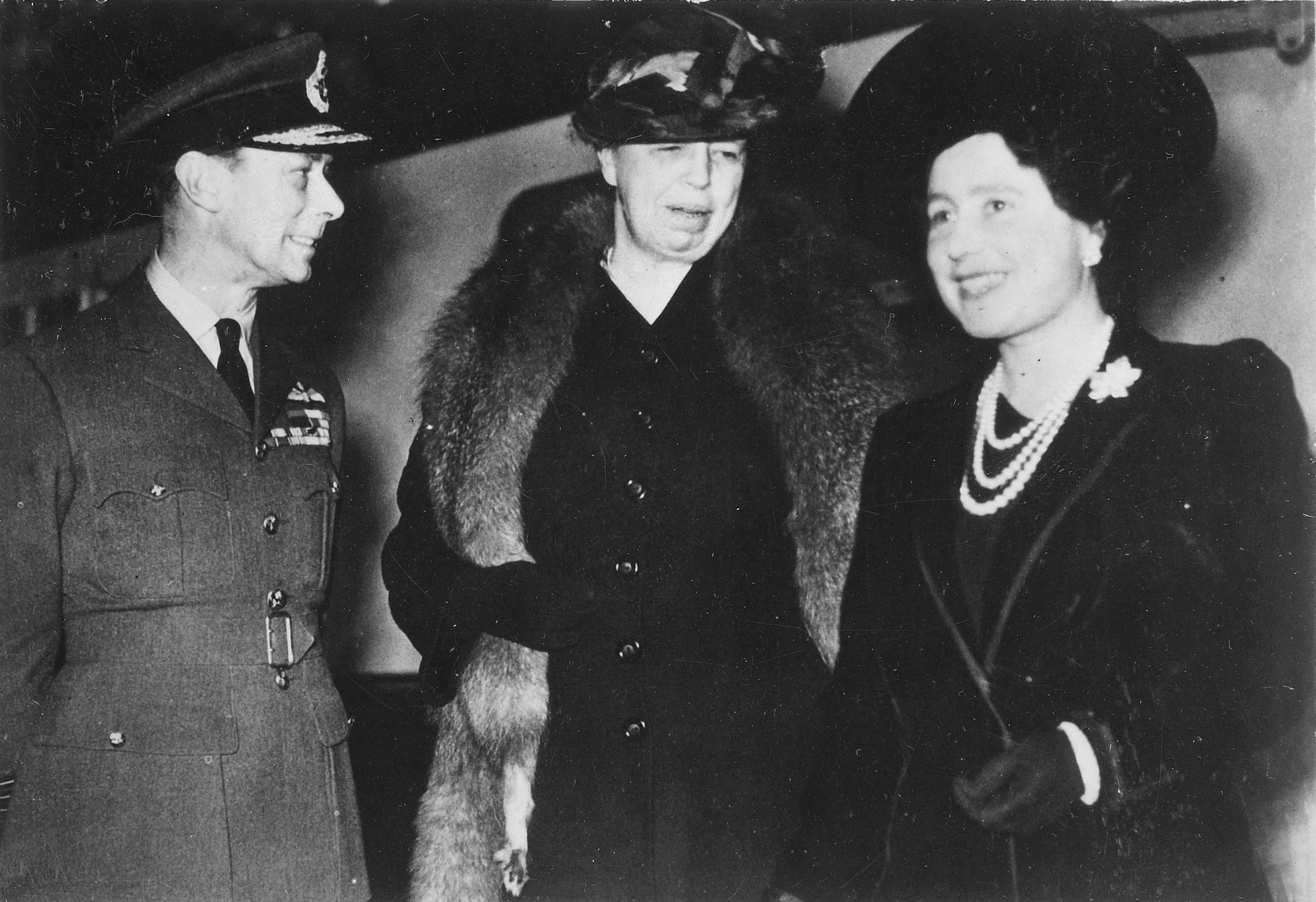
Eleanor Roosevelt (centre) wears a Clare Potter dress to meet King George VI and Queen Elizabeth in London, October 23, 1942.

During the 1940s, well-known Potter designs included a two-piece bathing suit consisting of separate small top and bloomers, a sweater designed for evening wear, and a sidesaddle-draped skirt. Examples of these designs were featured in the 1998-1999 exhibition Designing Women: American Style 1940-1960 at the Wadsworth Atheneum in Hartford, Connecticut. Her use of colour was distinctive, with one 1940s evening outfit consisting of a pink blouse, green belt, and pale blue skirt. Other designs were made up in one single, unique shade, such as the blue wool dress worn by Eleanor Roosevelt to meet George VI and his queen consort, Elizabeth in London on October 23, 1942. Roosevelt had been a fellow founder with Potter and others, of an association of women interested in advancing elegant and fashionable clothing for women, the Fashion Group International, FGI. In 1946, Potter was awarded a Coty Award for her casual clothes and her distinctive use of colour. She shared the award with Omar Kiam and Vincent Monte-Sano. Although she is considered an important figure in the world of sportswear design, the curator Richard Martin has stated that Potter was "not a pure sportswear advocate, she was a figure with a discreet, negotiated relationship to sportswear."

In 1948, Potter launched a ready-to-wear company called Timbertop, with former magazine editor, Martha Stout. The company shared its name with the turkey farm in West Nyack where Potter and her husband, architect J. Sanford Potter, lived. They had married about 1930.

== Later life ==
By the mid-1950s Clare Potter worked independently from a barn on her farm. Her business became a husband-and-wife concern, with J. Sanford Potter assisting by drafting her clothing patterns. Her later clothes were more tailored and dressy than her earlier designs.

In the late 1950s the Potters moved into a Japanese-style house on Lake Nebo in Fort Ann, New York that was designed and built by J. Sanford. In addition to their professional work, they bred Dalmatian dogs, grew camellias, and enjoyed riding and hunting. They kept their horses in Virginia, where the local hunt clubs enjoyed a long season.

J. Sanford Potter died in 1994 and, at the age of 95, Clare Potter died in 1999 at their home in Fort Ann. They left no surviving family.
