= James D. Shaver =

American politician and judge (1861–1951)

Member of the Arkansas House of Representatives Howard County
- In office 1888–1892

Personal details
- Born: James David Shaver; February 28, 1861 Reed's Creek, Lawrence County, Arkansas, U.S.
- Died: March 14, 1951 (aged 90) Ashdown, Arkansas, U.S.
- Party: Democratic
- Spouse: Sallie Hunter Borden (m. 1884; died 1929)
- Children: 5, including Dorothy
- Parent: Robert G. Shaver (father)
- Occupation: Politician; lawyer; judge

James David Shaver (February 28, 1861 – March 14, 1951) was an American politician and judge from Arkansas. He was a member of the Arkansas House of Representatives from 1888 to 1892. He later served as chancellor judge of the sixth chancery district from 1901 to 1922.

== Early life ==
James David Shaver was born on February 28, 1861, in Reed's Creek, Lawrence County, Arkansas, as the second of eight children to Adelaide L. (née Ringgold) and Robert G. Shaver. His father was a Confederate officer and Ku Klux Klan leader. In 1873, the family moved to Center Point. He studied law under his father in 1882 and was admitted to the bar in March 1884 at Center Point.

== Career ==
Shaver practiced the law with his father in Center Point under the firm Shaver & Shaver until 1889. They were both engaged in the Brooks and Bussell murder cases. After 1889, he practiced law by himself.

Shaver was a Democrat. He served in the Arkansas House of Representatives from 1888 to 1892. He introduced a bill to amend the constitution to change the way school tax was levied and collected, but its passage failed. He also introduced a bill to add a statute of limitations to writings that are under seal. This bill became law. He served as chairman of the Democratic Central Committee. He was mayor of Center Point for two terms, including one in 1888.

From 1890 to 1894, Shaver served as prosecuting attorney of the ninth judicial court in Howard County. He had a law practice in Center Point until 1898 and then continued practicing law in Mena until the spring of 1908. He practiced law in Mena in the firm Shaver & Norwood with Hal L. Norwood.

On April 6, 1901, Shaver was appointed by Governor Jeff Davis as chancellor judge of the sixth chancery district. He was re-elected in 1905 and 1910. In October 1911, he announced his campaign for Arkansas's fourth district seat in the U.S. Congress. He lost the Democratic nomination to Otis Wingo. From 1912 to 1913, he was president of the Arkansas Bar Association. In 1915, he opened offices in Miller County courthouse. In 1922, he retired from the bench and did not seek re-election as chancellor judge. He continued to practice law.

== Personal life ==
Shaver married Sallie Hunter Borden, daughter of Benjamin J. Borden, of Somerset, Kentucky, on December 16, 1884. Her father was an educator, journalist, and was an editor of the Little Rock Gazette. His wife died in 1929. They had five children, including James D., Robert Benjamin, Dorothy, and Elsie. His daughter Dorothy worked in the fashion industry. Shaver was a Mason and Elk. He was associated with the Presbyterian Church.

Shaver lived in Ashdown. He later lived in Mena. In 1915, he moved with his family to Hickory Street in Texarkana. He died of a heart attack on March 14, 1951, at the home of his son in Ashdown.
