= Ben Reig =

American fashion businessman

Ben Reig (d.1968) was an American fashion businessman who ran his eponymous New York company from 1929 to 1968. The company closed in 1973.

The Ben Reig company was founded in 1929. Reig employed various designers to head it up, most notably being the Hollywood costume designer Omar Kiam from 1941 to 1954. In 1946, Kiam won the Coty Award for his work at Ben Reig. In 1954, Kiam was succeeded by Edward Beckham until 1960. From 1961 to 1968, Eva Rosencrans was head designer for the label. Liz Claiborne also worked for Reig in the early 1950s when she was Kiam's assistant.

Reig died in 1968. His obituary in The New York Times credited him with helping make cotton popular as a fashion fabric.

The Ben Reig company closed in 1973.
