= Goldworm =

American clothing company

- Industry: clothing
- Founded: 1927
- Founder: Samuel Goldworm; Gertrude Goldworm
- Defunct: 1981
- Fate: disestablished
- Headquarters: United States
- Key people: Robert Goldworm
- Products: sportswear

Goldworm was an American sportswear company that ran from 1927 to 1981. It was particularly famous for its knitwear designs.

== History ==
The Goldworm company was founded in 1927 by Samuel Goldworm (d.1953) and his wife Gertrude (d.1983). Their son, Robert Goldworm, joined the company in 1947, and succeeded his father as company president. Under Robert's leadership, the company became quickly renowned for high quality knitwear, for which it won a Coty Award in 1956. Robert Goldworm was an active promoter of knitwear, opening a base in Milan, Italy, where he could have top-quality Italian knits made for the New York market. The first designer of American knits in Italy, in 1959 he was made a Commander of the Order of the Star of Italian Solidarity by the Italian government in recognition of his active promotion and support of the Italian knitwear industry. In addition to this, Goldworm won five Woolknit Design Awards.

Following Robert's retirement in 1981 (Gertrude had retired a few years earlier in 1977), the Goldworm company was disestablished. Gertrude Goldworm died on 23 May 1983, and Robert Goldworm died 3 December 1991 of an embolism related to pancreatic cancer.
