= Renee Hunter =

American model

- Born: Brooklyn, New York, U.S.
- Modeling information
- Agency: Mannequin

Renee Hunter is a model, fashion director, and professor. She is an enrolled member of the Shinnecock Indian Nation.

== Early life ==
Hunter was born in Brooklyn, grew up in Queens, and summered in Southampton, NY on the Shinnecock Reservation with her family.

== Career ==
=== Modeling ===
Hunter was scouted by modeling agency Mannequin, a New York agency run by Gillis MacGill, while attending the CFDA Fashion Awards. Hunter worked as a model in New York City in the 1960s and 70s through the Mannequin model agency. She appeared in the pages of Vogue (magazine) and Women's Wear Daily, and was one of three Black models working in New York at the time. She walked runways for Donald Brooks, Chester Weinberg, and worked as a fitting model for Jacques Tiffeau. In February 1968, Hunter walked the catwalk and modeled outside the White House for the first White House Fashion Show, organized by the first lady of the United States, Lady Bird Johnson.

=== Business ===
In the 1970s and 80s, Hunter worked at Saks Fifth Avenue as a European fashion buyer and Bloomingdales as a Fashion Director. In 1986 Hunter founded the consulting firm Sequoyah Fashion Planning, taking on clients for merchandising, marketing and sales. With this experience she was often featured in the press providing fashion tips and business insights to readers.

=== Academia ===
Hunter has long held a strong philosophy of sharing her knowledge and experience with students. Since 2014, Hunter has worked as an adjunct professor at the Fashion Institute of Technology and with LIM College. She also worked as a design critic at the Pratt Institute, which for several years gave an annual student award in her name.

=== Philanthropy ===
Hunter has been a board member of the Shinnecock Nation American Indian Community House multiple times.

=== Author ===
In 2006, Hunter collaborated with author Michael McCollom as the Creative Director on McCollom's book, The Way We Wore: Black Style Then. The book was featured in the New York Times T (magazine) in 2006 and the Metropolitan Museum of Art. McCollom would go on to co-curate an exhibition at the Museum of the City of New York titled Black Style Now that relied on this material.
