= Liz Claiborne =

American fashion designer (1929–2007)

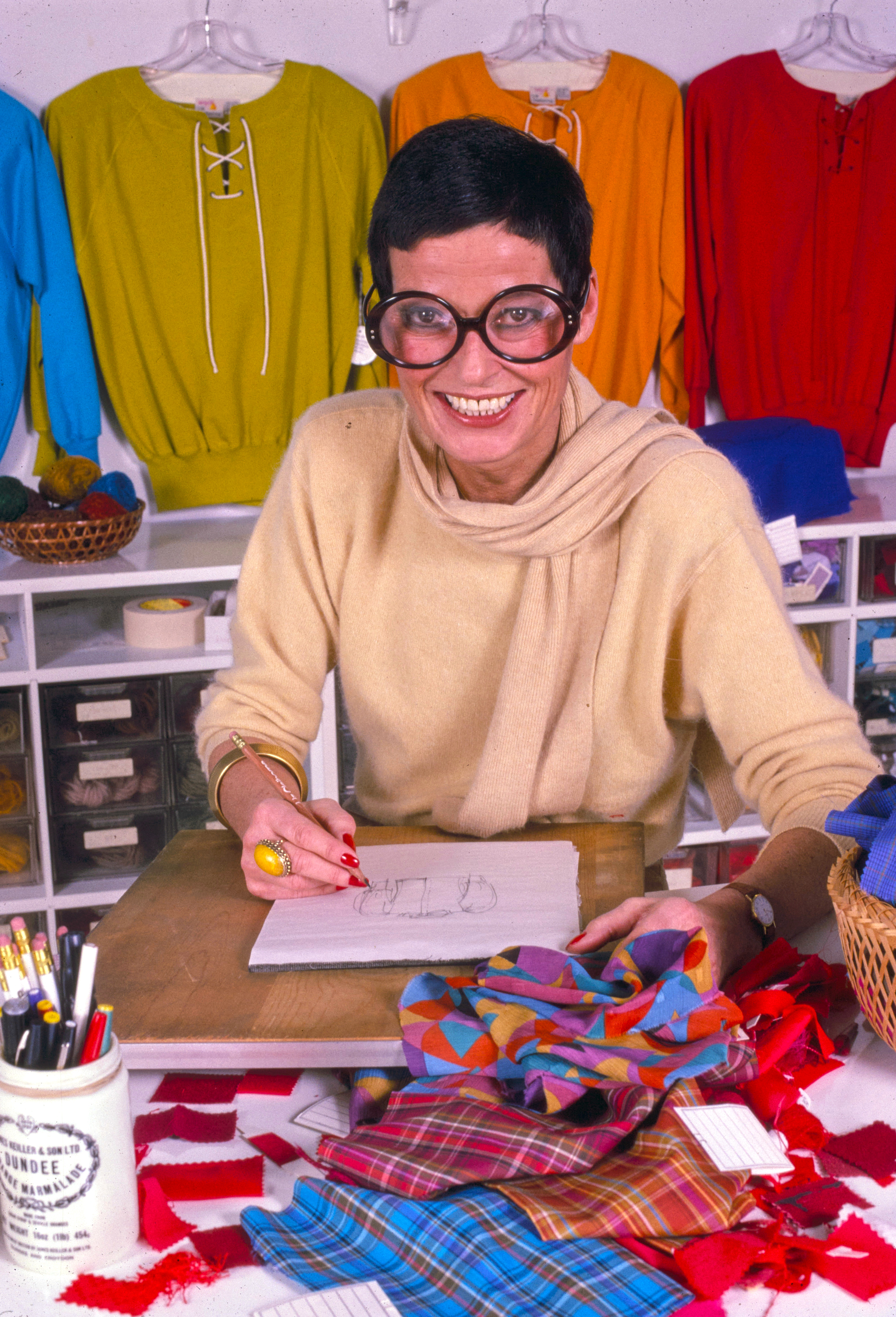
- Claiborne in 1982
- Born: Anne Elisabeth Jane Claiborne; March 31, 1929; Brussels, Belgium
- Died: June 26, 2007 (aged 78); New York City, U.S.
- Education: Fine Arts School and Painters Studio, Belgium (1947); Nice Academy (1948)
- Label: Liz Claiborne
- Spouses: Ben Shultz (m. 1950; div. 1954); Arthur Ortenberg (m. 1957)
- Relatives: Jennifer Farber (niece)

Anne Elisabeth Jane Claiborne (March 31, 1929 – June 26, 2007) was an American fashion designer and businesswoman. Her success was built upon stylish yet affordable apparel for career women featuring colorfully tailored separates that could be mixed and matched. Claiborne co-founded Liz Claiborne Inc., which in 1986 became the first company founded by a woman to make the Fortune 500 list. Claiborne was the first woman to become chair and CEO of a Fortune 500 company.

== Early life and education ==
Claiborne was born in Brussels to American parents. She came from a prominent Louisiana family with an ancestor, William C. C. Claiborne, who served as Louisiana's first governor after statehood, during the War of 1812.

In 1939, at the start of World War II, the family returned to New Orleans. Claiborne attended St. Timothy's School for Girls, a small boarding school in Maryland. She and her sisters moved to Mountain Lakes, New Jersey, where she attended, but did not graduate from, Mountain Lakes High School.

Rather than finishing high school, Claiborne went to Europe to study art in the studios of painters. Her father did not believe that she needed an education, so she studied art informally.

== Career ==
In 1949, Claiborne won the Jacques Heim National Design Contest (sponsored by Harper's Bazaar), and then moved to Manhattan where she worked for years in the Garment District on Seventh Avenue, as a sketch artist at Tina Leser, the sportswear producer. She also worked for the former Hollywood costume designer-turned-fashion designer, Omar Kiam. She worked as a designer for the Dan Keller and Youth Group Inc. fashion labels.

=== Liz Claiborne Inc. ===
Claiborne became frustrated by the failure of the companies that employed her to provide practical clothes for working women, so, with husband Art Ortenberg, Leonard Boxer, and Jerome Chazen, she launched her own design company, Liz Claiborne Inc., in 1976. It was an immediate success, with sales of $2 million in 1976 and $23 million in 1978. By 1988, it had acquired one-third of the American women's upscale sportswear market.

Marketing strategies that Claiborne developed changed the nature of retail stores. For example, Claiborne insisted that her line of clothing be displayed separately, as a department to itself and including all of the items she offered. This was the first time customers were able to select many types of clothing articles by brand name alone in one location of a department store. That tradition for the grouping of special brands has become the typical arrangement for name brands in contemporary stores.

In 1980, Liz Claiborne Accessories was founded through employee Nina McLemore (who decades later would launch a label of her own, in 2001). Liz Claiborne Inc. went public in 1981 and made the Fortune 500 list in 1986 with retail sales of $1.2 billion.

Claiborne listed all employees in her corporate directory in alphabetical order, to circumvent what she perceived as male hierarchies. She controlled meetings by ringing a glass bell and became famous for her love of red—"Liz Red". She would sometimes pose as a saleswoman to see what average women thought of her clothes.

== Personal life, retirement, and death ==
Claiborne's first marriage was to Ben Shultz; it ended in divorce in 1954, after she met Arthur Ortenberg. In 1957, she and her then co-worker, Arthur (1926 - 2014) married. She had a son from her first marriage, Alexander G. Shultz, and two stepchildren from her second marriage, Neil Ortenberg and Nancy Ortenberg.

Claiborne retired from active management in 1989. By that stage, she had acquired other companies including Kayser-Roth, which produced Liz Claiborne accessories. Her husband retired at the same time, leaving the other founders as the active managers.

In retirement, Claiborne and Ortenberg established a foundation that distributed millions in funding to environmental causes, including the television series Nature on PBS and nature conservation projects around the world. She received an Honorary Doctorate of Fine Arts from the Rhode Island School of Design.

Claiborne was advised in May 1997 that she had a rare form of cancer affecting the lining of the abdomen. She died of the cancer on June 26, 2007, at the age of 78.

== Awards and honors ==
- 1990 - National Business Hall of Fame, sponsored by Junior Achievement
- 1991 - National Sales Hall of Fame
- 1991 - Honorary Doctorate from the Rhode Island School of Design
- 1993 - Golden Plate Award of the American Academy of Achievement
- 2000 - Council of Fashion Designers of America Lifetime Achievement Award
