= Muriel King =

American fashion designer

Muriel King (1900–1977) was an American fashion designer based in New York City. She was one of the first American fashion designers along with Elizabeth Hawes and Clare Potter to achieve name recognition. She also designed costumes for several major films in the 1930s and 1940s.

== Early life ==
Muriel King was born August 27, 1900, in Bayview, Washington. King began her design studies at the Cornish School, now Cornish College of the Arts, in scenic design under Maurice Browne, co-founder of Cornish's Theater Department, and head designer Thilda Olson—all while attending the University of Washington. She later studied watercolor painting and theatre design at the New York School of Fine and Applied Arts. Afterwards, she went to Paris and worked as a fashion illustrator for magazines such as Femina and Vogue. She opened her salon at East 61st Street, New York, in 1932.

== Fashion design ==
King specialised in good-quality separates and day-into-evening looks, which proved versatile and good value during the Great Depression. King kept her designs simple and high quality, believing that dresses should just have one detail. Her method of working was unusual, as she was not a formally trained fashion designer, and did not cut, drape or sew. She created fully finished watercolour sketches showing her designs, which her tailors and sewing staff then interpreted into proper garments.

In September 1933 King entered a partnership with the department store B. Altman and Company, who sold her clothing through their Shop for American Design. Her collection for that season was inspired by 1400s armour, with a suit costing $250 (equivalent to $4625 in 2015) whilst the Altman's reproduction cost $75 (equivalent to $1387.25 in 2015). King also signed a licensing partnership with Lord & Taylor. In 1936, Muriel King was featured alongside Elizabeth Hawes and Clare Potter in the second Lord & Taylor "American Look" promotion which championed home-grown American design talent.

King went on to design the personal wardrobe for movie actress Katharine Hepburn. From 1935 to 1944, she designed costumes for eight major movies, including two of Hepburn's. She was on the short list to design the costumes for Gone with the Wind, but despite being the author Margaret Mitchell's favourite, failed to win the job (which went to Walter Plunkett). She also created film clothes for Rita Hayworth, Margaret Sullavan, and Ginger Rogers.

During the 1940s, in addition to her Hollywood work, King produced ready-to-wear designs for department stores. In 1943, she created a collection of clothes specially for female factory workers at Boeing and other West Coast aerospace firms, called Flying Fortress Fashions.

In 1945, she was hired director of the Fine and Applied Fashion Department at Stephens College, a women's college in Columbia, Mo., and helped establish its fashion program.

== Later life ==
King retired from fashion in 1957 to paint full-time. She died in 1977.

== Exhibitions ==
- Muriel King: Artist of Fashion at the Fashion Institute of Technology, 10 March - 4 April 2009.

== Film wardrobe ==
Muriel King worked on wardrobe for the following films:

- Sylvia Scarlett (1935, Katharine Hepburn's clothes.)
- Stage Door (1937, gowns)
- Manhattan Merry-Go-Round, (1937, Tamara Geva's gowns)
- Appointment for Love (1941, Margaret Sullavan's gowns)
- Back Street (1941, Margaret Sullavan's gowns)
- The Woman in the Window (1944)
- Casanova Brown (1944)
- Christmas Holiday (1944)
- Cover Girl (1944, gowns)
