= Nettie Rosenstein =

American fashion designer (1890–1980)

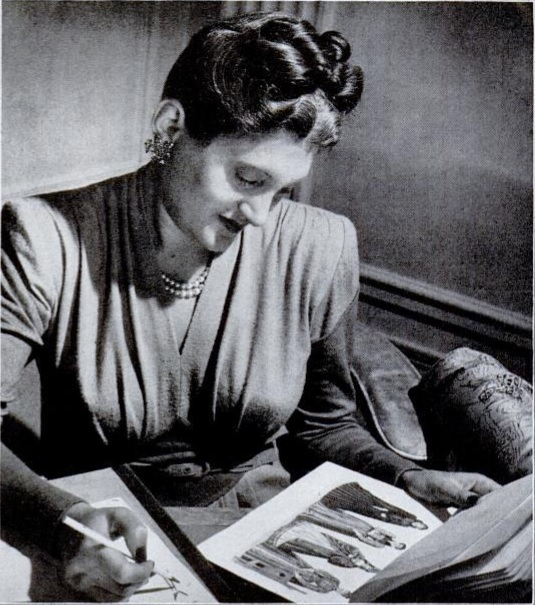
- Nettie Rosenstein in 1944
- Born: 1890; Salzburg, Duchy of Salzburg, Austria-Hungary
- Died: March 13, 1980 (age 90); New York City, U.S.
- Known for: little black dresses; costume jewelry
- Label: Nettie Rosenstein
- Spouse: Saul Rosenstein (m. 1913; died 1966)
- Children: 2
- Awards: Coty Award; Neiman Marcus Fashion Award

Nettie Rosenstein (1890 - March 13, 1980) was an American fashion designer, based in New York City between c.1913 and 1975. She was particularly renowned for her little black dresses and costume jewelry.

== Early life ==
Born Nettie Rosenscrans in Salzburg, Austria-Hungary in 1890, she and her family migrated to America in the 1890s and settled in Harlem, New York. Her family was Jewish. In 1913 Nettie married Saul Rosenstein, who ran a women's underwear business, and began dressmaking as a home business. After being approached by the I. Magnin department store in 1919, she began wholesaling. By 1921, she owned an establishment with 50 workers in Manhattan, New York.

== Nettie Rosenstein Inc. ==
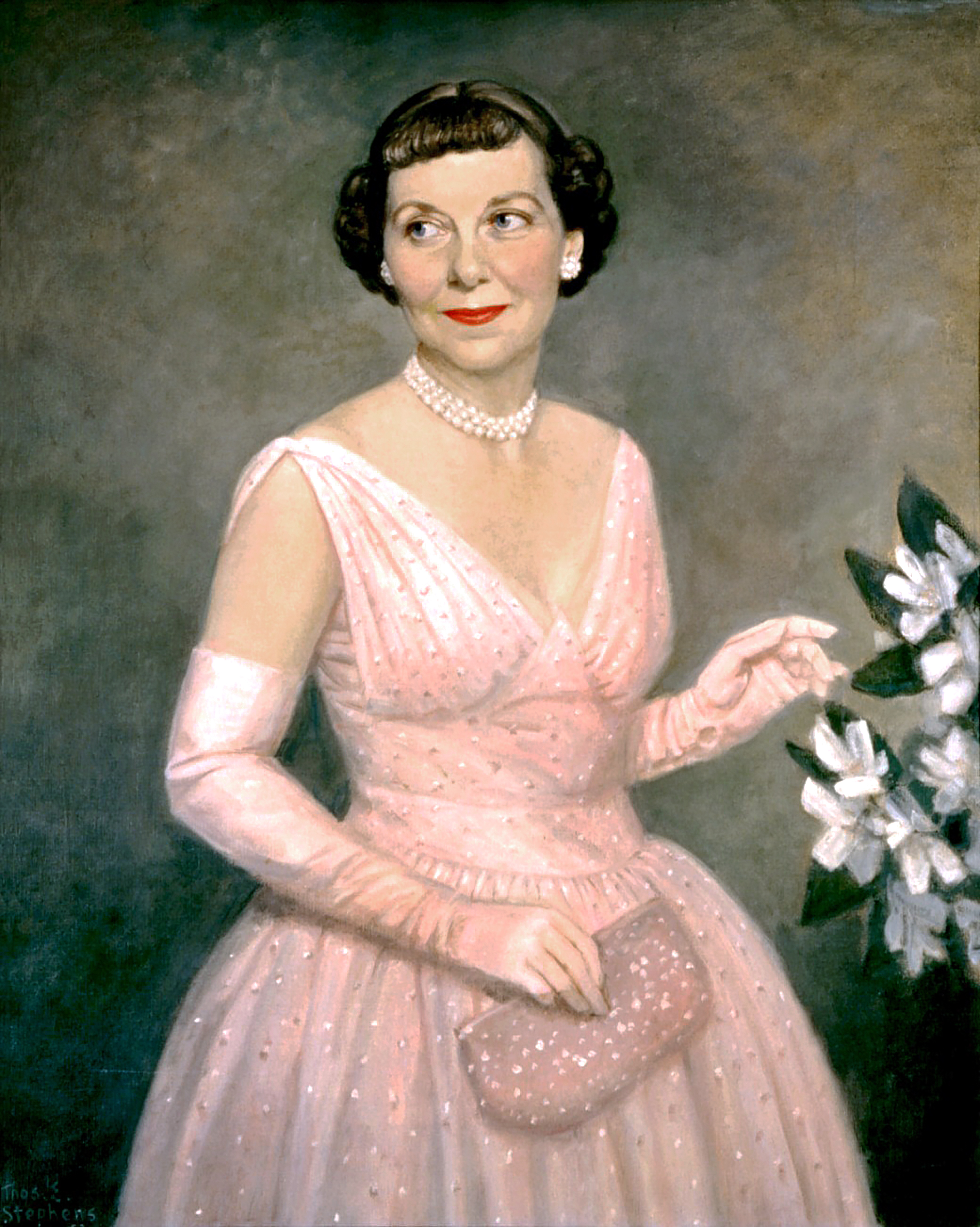
Mamie Eisenhower in her inauguration ball gown designed by Eva Rosencrans at Nettie Rosenstein (Painted in 1953 by Thomas Stevens)

In the 1920s American fashion business, imported fashions by named French couturiers were considered the best to be had. At this time Rosenstein's designs were sold by stores under their own labels, though purchasers were told that the dresses were in fact by Nettie Rosenstein. Through word of mouth Rosenstein earned name recognition and her own-name label became a valuable commodity. Her clothes were retailed around America, but only one store in each city was permitted to carry fashions bearing Rosenstein's label. In 1927 Rosenstein tried an early retirement, but resumed designing in 1931, when she reopened on West 47th Street in collaboration with her sister-in-law Eva Rosencrans and Charles Gumprecht.

In 1937, Rosenstein was described by Life Magazine as one of the most highly regarded American designers. She was one of the first recipients of the Neiman Marcus Fashion Award on its launch in 1938. In 1940, Rosenstein clothing was sold out of 92 shops and department stores across the USA, at prices ranging from $98 to $500. Whilst these prices were beyond the range of most consumers, Rosenstein's designs were so widely copied that she still influenced the average American woman's wardrobe. One such design was the "little black dress" designed to go from day to evening with low-cut evening necklines combined with daywear silhouettes and materials. Nettie Rosenstein designs also included printed dresses with gloves to match, and she was also known for her accessories and striking costume jewelry. Many of the more striking Nettie Rosenstein garments were designed by Eva Rosencrans as Rosenstein preferred to focus her attention on running the business, and her sister-in-law was happy to let Nettie take credit for her work.

Nettie Rosenstein announced her second retirement in March 1942, inspiring a tribute in TIME Magazine. However, this retirement did not last long, as she resumed fashion design a few years later, winning a Coty Award in 1947. Nettie Rosenstein was responsible for First Lady Mamie Eisenhower's dress commissioned by Neiman Marcus for the 1953 presidential inauguration Ball, and the subsequent 1957 ballgown for the second presidential inauguration was designed by Eva Rosencrans, a good friend of Mamie's since 1950.

== Later life ==
Nettie Rosenstein discontinued the fashion side of her business in 1961. Eva Rosencrans went on to design clothing for Ben Reig, while their long term business partner and Coty Award winner, Sol L. Klein, continued to design and manufacture costume jewelry and accessories under the name Nettie Rosenstein Accessories until 1975. He retired in 1975, the same time as the Nettie Rosenstein brand closed. On March 13, 1980, after a long illness, Nettie Rosenstein died at the age of 90.
