= Kennedy Fraser =

American essayist, and fashion writer

Kennedy Fraser (born 1948) is an American essayist, and fashion writer.

== Life ==
She is a native of England. Her work appeared in Vogue, The New Yorker, where she wrote for William Shawn.

== Awards ==
- 1994 Whiting Award

== Works ==
=== Books ===
- Fashionable Mind: Reflections on Fashion 1970-1981. Knopf. October 12, 1981. ISBN 978-0-394-51775-9.
- Scenes from the Fashionable World. Knopf. 1987. ISBN 978-0-394-55483-9.
- Ornament and Silence: Essays on Women's Lives. Knopf. 1996. ISBN 978-0-394-58539-0.
  - Ornament and Silence: Essays on Women's Lives from Edith Wharton to Germaine Greer. Vintage Books. 1998. ISBN 978-0-375-70112-2.

=== Anthologies ===
- Gilbert T. Sewall, ed. (1998). "The Fashionable Mind". The Eighties: a reader. Da Capo Press. ISBN 978-0-7382-0035-4.
- Virginia Wright Wexman, ed. (1999). "Portrait of a Director". Jane Campion: interviews. University Press of Mississippi. ISBN 978-1-57806-083-2.

=== Articles ===
- "The Mighty Penn", Vogue, July 2007.
