= Merry Hull =

American designer and inventor

- Born: Gladys Whitcomb Geissmann; August 6, 1908
- Died: June 1978 (aged 69)

Gladys Whitcomb Geissmann (August 6, 1908 – June 1978), better known as Merry Hull, was an American designer and inventor.

The sister of illustrator Jon Whitcomb, Hull graduated from Ohio Wesleyan University where she was a member of the Alpha Rho chapter of Delta Gamma.

Hull invented a new style of "Free Finger" gloves with U-shaped rather than V-shaped tips. This new style of glove was more comfortable than traditional gloves for women with long nails. She sold the patent to the Daniel Hayes Company. In 1938, the gloves sold for between $4.50 and $6.95. According to Life magazine, Hull would earn $200,000 if a million pairs were sold. In 1939, the Lord & Taylor department store awarded Hull a $1,000 prize for her ingenuity.

In 1946, Merry Hull created a "Turnabout Unit," a set of bolero, hat, bag, and belt that could be made at home from a pattern. A response to wartime shortages, the "Turnabout Unit" allowed women to update their wardrobes with fabric they already owned. The patterns were sold for ten cents by This Week magazine.

In 1948, the B. Altman department store announced a new line of clothing for young boys from Merry Hull. This new line, "Merry Mites," included a full range of styles for toddler and preschool boys. The clothing was designed with big buttons and strategic zippers for ease of dressing. The adjustable fit allowed each item to be worn by a growing boy for up to two years. The inspiration for "Merry Mites" was Hull's own young son.

Hull was the Neiman Marcus Fashion Award winner in 1949.
