= Richard Martin (curator) =

American scholar (1947–1999)

Martin in 1996

Richard Martin (1947–1999) was an American scholar, lecturer, critic and curator, and a leading art and fashion historian. At the time of his death he was curator of the Costume Institute at the Metropolitan Museum of Art, creating many critically acclaimed exhibitions and contributing widely towards publications on the subject. After his death, an award in his name was set up to recognise creative, high quality and innovative costume exhibitions.

== Early life and education ==
Richard Harrison Martin was born December 4, 1946, at Bryn Mawr, PA. He studied at Swarthmore College, graduating in 1967, and gained two master's degrees, both from Columbia University. As a lecturer, he held academic positions at the School of Visual Arts, New York University, Columbia, the Juilliard School and Parsons School of Design. and the Fashion Institute of Technology.

== Curatorship ==
Richard Martin taught art history from 1973 at New York University, the Fashion Institute of Technology (FIT), and the School of Visual Arts. In 1980 he became involved with fashion exhibitions at FIT where he worked with Harold Koda and Laura Sinderbrand, the director of FIT's Design Laboratory (now the Museum at FIT). He served as the editor in chief of Arts Magazine before his 1991 appointment as executive director of the Shirley Goodman Resource Center, which was responsible for FIT's exhibitions and collections.

The exhibitions Martin and Koda put up at FIT, including The East Village, Fashion and Surrealism, Undercover Story, and Three Women: Madeleine Vionnet, Claire McCardell, Rei Kawakubo attracted a great deal of attention. In 1987 they were given a special award from the Council of Fashion Designers of America. Martin would later win another award from the Council in 1996 "for furthering fashion in art and culture." Koda, who worked closely with Martin on exhibitions until they parted company in 1997, later said:

"We did five or six shows a year at F.I.T. and three a year at the Met, while most museums do only one. And he always had three or four years' worth of ideas. Some fashion people had difficulty with his language, because his language was the language of art, not fashion."

Martin wrote over 100 scholarly papers on a wide range of subjects, such as Art History and the Assimilation of Images by Contemporary Artists, and Redress of the Nerds: The Assertion of Nerd Style in Men's Clothing and Imagery in the 1980s. He also wrote a number of books on fashion and art, including Fashion and Surrealism and Charles James, and co-authored others. Martin was critical of the tendency within the art world to designate fashion into a corner of its own, and not acknowledging designers as artists, rather than merely being commercially driven. He states:

I think that’s an abiding problem for artists, that because fashion is so often thought to be less serious than art, artists are afraid that they will vitiate their own work and their own importance as artists by participating in any way in fashion. Artists will often shy away from fashion and yet when it comes to incorporating fashion into their own work—such as David Salle using sort of 1950s fashion sketches in his work—that’s perfectly acceptable.

He was also editor of Dress, the Costume Society of America's scholarly journal.

== Death and legacy ==
Richard Martin died at home in New York, aged 52, of melanoma on November 8, 1999. He was survived by his partner, Dr. Richard Slusarczyk; and by a brother, Robert.

=== The Richard Martin Award ===
The Richard Martin Award for Excellence in the Exhibition of Costume was created by the Costume Society of America and launched in 2002. Martin was a valued member of the Society who, in addition to editing Dress, had served on the board of directors for six years and stood as President of the Mid-Atlantic region of the Society. The award is given to up to two institutions per year in recognition of high quality and innovative exhibitions of fashion and clothing.

2002

- The Museum at FIT for London Fashion

2003

- McCord Museum, Montreal, Quebec, Canada for Clothes Make The Man
- Los Angeles County Museum of Art for Miracles and Mischief: Noh and Kyogen Theater in Japan

2004

- Colonial Williamsburg for The Language of Clothing

2005

- Mark Twain House for "Modesty Died When Clothes Were Born": Costume in the Life and Literature of Mark Twain

2006

- No award was given for this year

2007

- Yeshiva University Museum for A Perfect Fit: The Garment Industry and American Jewry 1860-1960

2008

- Kent State University Museum for a series of exhibitions comprising The Age of Nudity; Hair: The Rise of Individuality, 1790-1840; and Fashion on the Ohio Frontier: 1790-1840.
- Metropolitan Museum of Art for Poiret: King of Fashion

2009

- McCord Museum for Reveal or Conceal?

2010

- Fashion Institute of Design & Merchandising Museum, for High Style: Betsey Bloomingdale and The Haute Couture.

2011

- Metropolitan Museum of Art for American Woman: Fashioning a National Identity
- The Museum at FIT for Eco-Fashion: Going Green
- A Certificate of Commendation was awarded to the University of Alberta for In Mother's Hood: Inuit Packing Dolls of Taloyoak

2012

- No award was given for this year

2013

- Two Certificates of Commendation were awarded, one to the Design Exchange in Toronto, Canada, for 60 Years Designing the Ballet; the other to the Western Reserve Historical Society of Cleveland, Ohio, for Tying The Knot.
