= List of Fashion Institute of Technology alumni =

This is a list of graduates, past students and alumni of the Fashion Institute of Technology in New York City.

== Alumni ==
=== Artists ===
- Jamie Beck – photographer and writer
- Tony Chi – interior designer
- Molly Crabapple – artist and writer
- CYJO – fine-art photographer
- Danielle De Jesus – visual artist and photographer
- Rosetta DeBerardinis – artist
- Daria Dorosh – Ukrainian artist, educator and activist
- Marie-Denise Douyon – Canadian painter, illustrator and graphic artist
- Anna Frangiosa – artist and cabaret performer
- Gloria Garfinkel – visual artist
- Lynn Gilbert – photographer and writer
- Roxanne Lowit – fashion and celebrity photographer
- Ryan Ashley Malarkey – tattoo artist, 2007
- Janet McKenzie – painter of religious themes
- Sara Rahbar (born 1976) – fine artist, attended 1996–2000
- Fabrice Simon – Haitian-American abstract artist and fashion designer
- Dean Skira – lighting designer
- Lady Starlight – performance artist; muse of pop star Lady Gaga
- Frederick Weston – African-American gay artist whose collages were recognized for their importance late in his life

=== Actors, entertainment industry ===
- Karen Allen – actress
- Madison Anderson – Miss Universe Puerto Rico 2019
- Aquaria – winner of RuPaul's Drag Race season 10
- Fonzworth Bentley – hip hop artist, entertainer, fashion designer
- Lady Colin Campbell – writer and television personality
- Helen Castillo – fashion designer; cast member on season 12 of the reality-television series Project Runway
- Laverne Cox – actress and LGBT advocate
- Chloe Dao – winner of the television series Project Runway (season 2)
- Betty Davis – singer, songwriter, and model
- Amy Devers – furniture designer and television personality (Freeform Furniture, Designer People, Trading Spaces)
- Peter DiPilato – entertainment photographer
- Mich Dulce – Filipina fashion designer, reality-television show actor, and musician
- Amber Lee Ettinger – model and actress
- Scarlet Envy – drag queen, contestant on Rupaul's Drag Race season 11 and RuPaul's Drag Race All Stars season 6
- Randy Fenoli – television personality (Say Yes to the Dress), bridal designer, and chief executive officer of Randy Fenoli Enterprises, Inc.
- Gregory Gale – costume designer
- Kayne Gillaspie – fashion designer and Project Runway cast member
- Kimberly Goldson – fashion designer and Project Runway cast member
- Elena Goode – actress and Ford model
- Caroline Hirsch – founder and owner of Caroline's Comedy Club
- Agot Isidro – actress, singer, and television show host in the Philippines
- Janelle James – actress and comedian
- Margaret Josephs – fashion designer, entrepreneur and television personality; starred on Bravo television series The Real Housewives of New Jersey
- Jasmine Kennedie – drag queen, trans woman and contestant on Rupaul's Drag Race season 14
- Kilo Kish – singer-songwriter, textile artist, and painter
- Frankie Knuckles – DJ and producer, known for his involvement in pioneering house music
- Melissa McCarthy – film and television actress, comedian, writer and producer; attended for two years
- Oscar Nunez – actor and comedian
- Audrey Quock – model and actress
- Joel Schumacher – director, producer, writer, costume designer
- Angela Simmons – television personality, fashion designer, chief executive officer of Pastry Kicks
- Ramona Singer – television personality, starred on Bravo television series The Real Housewives of New York City
- Stephen A. Smith – sportscaster; attended for one year
- Angela Stribling - television and radio host and jazz singer
- Robert Verdi – television personality and style expert
- Daniel Vosovic – runner-up of the television series Project Runway (season 2)
- Joe Zee – creative director of Elle magazine, host of the Sundance Channel's original program All on the Line

=== Entrepreneurs ===
- Laure Hériard-Dubreuil – French entrepreneur and founder of a luxury multi-brand retailer, the Webster Miami

=== Fashion designers ===
- Robert Abajian – fashion designer who was senior vice president of Liz Claiborne Inc. and succeeded Claiborne as head of design in 1989
- Amsale Aberra – fashion designer of couture bridal gowns and eveningwear
- Reem Acra – fashion designer of couture bridal gowns and eveningwear
- Joe Ando-Hirsh – fashion designer, actor, influencer
- Jhane Barnes – fashion designer
- Polly Barton – textile artist
- Stephen Burrows – fashion designer, one of the first African-American fashion designers to sell internationally
- Grace Chen – fashion designer
- David Chu – fashion designer, president and chief executive officer of Nautica International, Inc.
- Mandy Coon – fashion designer
- Francisco Costa – designer, Calvin Klein collection for women
- Laura Dahl – fashion designer
- Marisol Deluna – fashion designer
- Alan Eckstein – fashion designer and co-founder of Timo Weiland
- Andrew Fezza – fashion designer
- Jon Haggins – fashion designer
- Carolina Herrera – fashion designer, president of Carolina Herrera New York
- Norma Kamali – fashion designer
- Calvin Klein (class of 1962) – founder of Calvin Klein, Inc.
- Michael Kors – fashion designer, president and chief executive officer of Michael Kors
- Nanette Lepore – fashion designer and owner, Robespierre, Inc.
- Leon Max – fashion designer, president and chief executive officer of Max Studios
- Arthur McGee – fashion designer, first African-American designer hired to run a design studio on Seventh Avenue in the Garment District in New York City
- Bibhu Mohapatra – fashion designer
- Charles Nolan – fashion designer
- Babette Pinsky – fashion designer
- Ralph Rucci (1980) – fashion designer, Chado Ralph Rucci
- Kate Stoltz – fashion designer and model
- Steve Summers – costume designer and creative director for Dolly Parton
- Ivy Supersonic – hat designer
- Ouigi Theodore – African-American designer behind the Brooklyn Circus label
- Isabel Toledo – fashion designer
- Hector Torres – fashion designer
- Henry Zankov – fashion designer and artistic director of Diane von Furstenberg
- Zaldy – designer for RuPaul

=== Illustrators ===
- Timothy D. Bellavia – children's writer and illustrator
- Enrico Casarosa – animator at Pixar
- Chris Eliopoulos – cartoonist
- Antonio Lopez – fashion illustrator

=== Jewelry, accessories designers ===
- Carolina Bucci – jewelry designer
- James de Givenchy – jewelry designer and owner of the jewelry company Taffin

=== Writers ===
- Sydney Biddle Barrows – businesswoman, socialite, management consultant and writer
- Cailli and Sam Beckerman – fashion bloggers
- Angie Cruz – novelist
- Erica De Mane – chef, food writer (including cookbook writer)
- Nina García – editor-in-chief of Elle magazine, and Project Runway judge
- Radhika Khanna – fashion designer and author of Yoga: From the Ganges to Wall Street and two other books
- Naomi Sims – model and writer

=== Other ===
- Greta Zimmer Friedman – Austrian-born American who was photographed being grabbed and kissed by Navy sailor George Mendonsa in Alfred Eisenstaedt's iconic 1945 V-J Day in Times Square photograph
