= Timo Weiland (brand) =

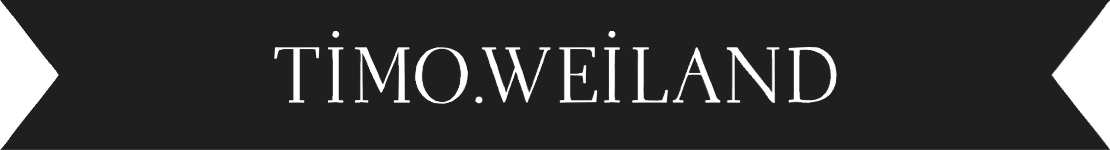

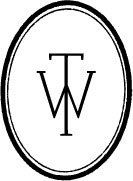
- Product type: Fashion line
- Country: New York, New York
- Introduced: 2010
- Website: timoweiland.com

Timo Weiland is a fashion line for men and women designed by Tim Weiland, Donna Kang and Alan Eckstein. Based in the Garment District of New York City, Timo Weiland started as a neckwear collection and evolved into a full-range womenswear and menswear designer clothing line.

== History ==
The men's and women's clothing line, Timo Weiland, was launched in 2010 after co-designers Weiland and Eckstein had joined together for a neckwear collection in 2009. Weiland graduated from Vanderbilt University in 2006 and moved to New York as an investment banking analyst for Deutsche Bank Securities. Having grown up with an interest in fashion after having learned how to sew from his mother he eventually met and collaborated with Fashion Institute of Technology students Alan Eckstein and Donna Kang in 2009.

The designs exhibit an overall classic look with a "twist." The Timo Weiland designers cite various sources for their design inspirations including a fictional trip that Keith Richards took with Gloria Vanderbilt to India in the 1960s. Other sources of inspiration for the fashion lines have included English Tudors architecture and upstate New York weekend getaways.

In 2015, Timo Weiland announced its partnership with Project I, a boutique incubator company focused on early stage apparel companies. Project I, the brand's first outside investment, took a 25 percent minority investment. In 2016, the company was named the style director for Crowne Plaza and debuted a line of uniforms for the hotel chain. In 2017, the brand announced it would focus on direct-to-consumer sales.

In the summer of 2019, Weiland, Kang, and Eckstein reunited the brand after each of the founders pursued their own fashion-related ventures.

== Fashion lines ==
In 2011, Timo Weiland had its first runway show. Timo Weiland debuted its fashion lines for four seasons before introducing its first ready-to-wear line in spring 2013. Since then, it has produced three other ready-to-wear lines for fall 2013, spring 2014, and fall 2014. Timo Weiland has also done a pre-fall collection in 2013 and a resort collection in 2014.

The label is sold at high-end stores such as Barneys New York and Takashimaya.

== Collaborations ==
The designers at Timo Weiland have stated that collaborative efforts are great learning experiences for them in which one can see how a different company operates and how their creative processes work. Timo Weiland has participated in various collaborations with companies such as: Tsubo shoes, Topman/Topshop, Bing Bang jewelry with Anna Sheffield, Urban Outfitters, Anthropologie, and Banana Republic. In November 2016, the company partnered with Zenni Optical to open its first brick-and-mortar location in New York City. In 2017, Timo Weiland designed jackets for the EDM duo, The Chainsmokers, the brand said similar styles will be available later in the year.

== Awards and recognition ==
When the Timo Weiland brand was launched, it was named one of the industry’s top 10 breakouts. The Timo Weiland designers were included in the 2012 Council of Fashion Designers of America's Incubator Program. The CFDA's Incubator Program includes 12 spots that are allotted to new and upcoming fashion designers. The program awards its participants with two years of coaching and collaboration in a New York-based office.

The Timo Weiland label was one of the finalists for the International Woolmark Prize for 2013-2014. The label was nominated again for the 2014-2015 Woolmark prize.

In 2014, Timo Weiland, Alan Eckstein and Donna Kang won the Ecco Domani Fashion Foundation Award for their Timo Weiland brand. The foundation annually recognizes emerging designers and winners of the award receive the opportunity to show their designs at New York's fall fashion week and are awarded a $25,000 grant. In 2016, the brand was awarded the first of six $75,000 CFDA x Cadillac grants and a retail spot lasting three months at Cadillac's global headquarters in New York City.
