= George Walter Vincent Smith Art Museum =

Art museum in Massachusetts, US

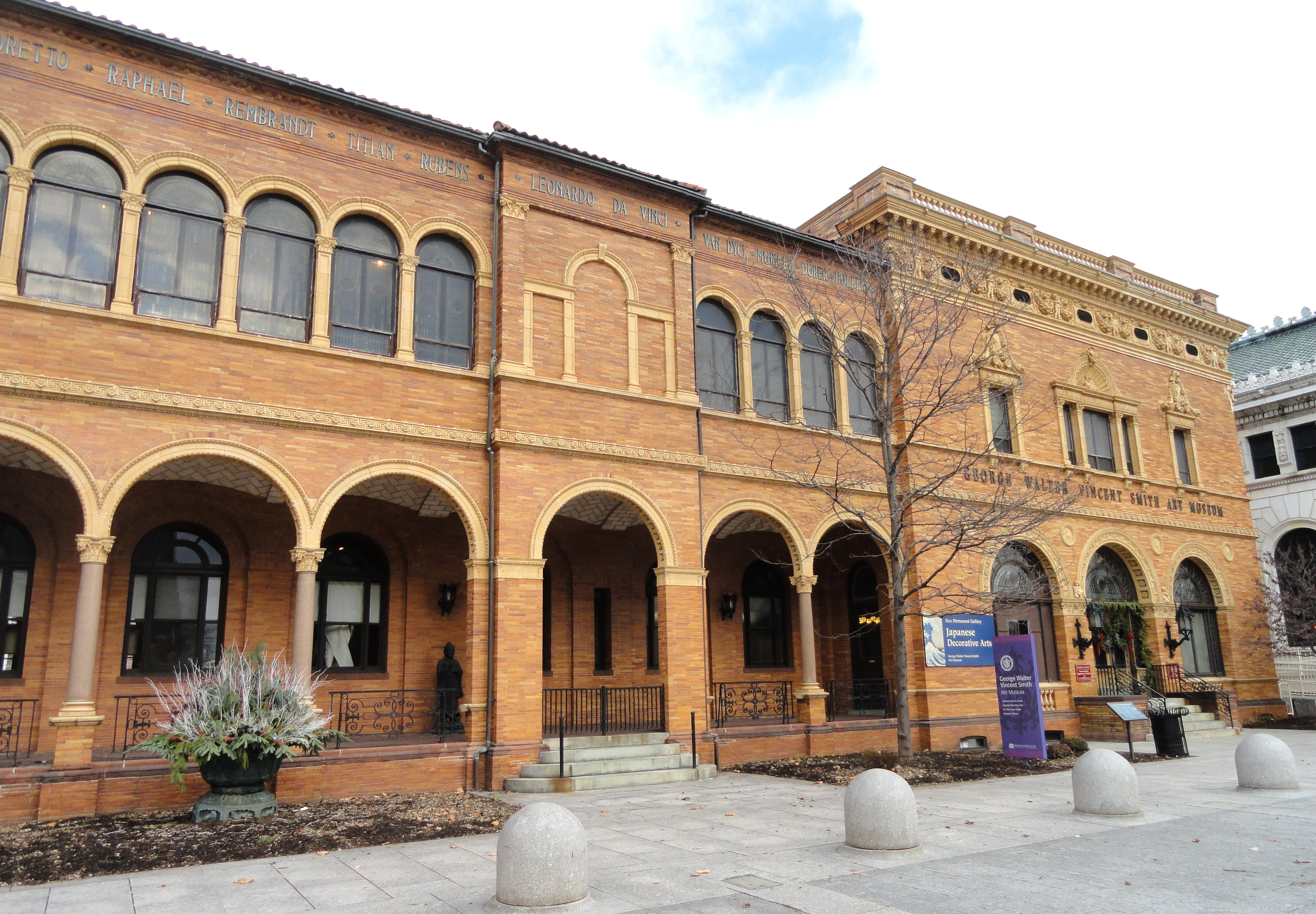
- Established: 1895
- Location: Quadrangle, Springfield, Massachusetts, United States
- Type: Art museum

The George Walter Vincent Smith Art Museum is an art museum in Springfield, Massachusetts. It is the oldest of the five museums on the Quadrangle.

The museum is named for the collection's original owner. Smith and his wife, Belle Townsley Smith, bequeathed their notable collection to begin the museum. The Italian palazzo-style building dates from 1895 and was designed by the New York City-based Renwick, Aspinwall & Renwick and Springfield native Walter Tallant Owen.

== George Walter Vincent and Belle Townsley Smith ==
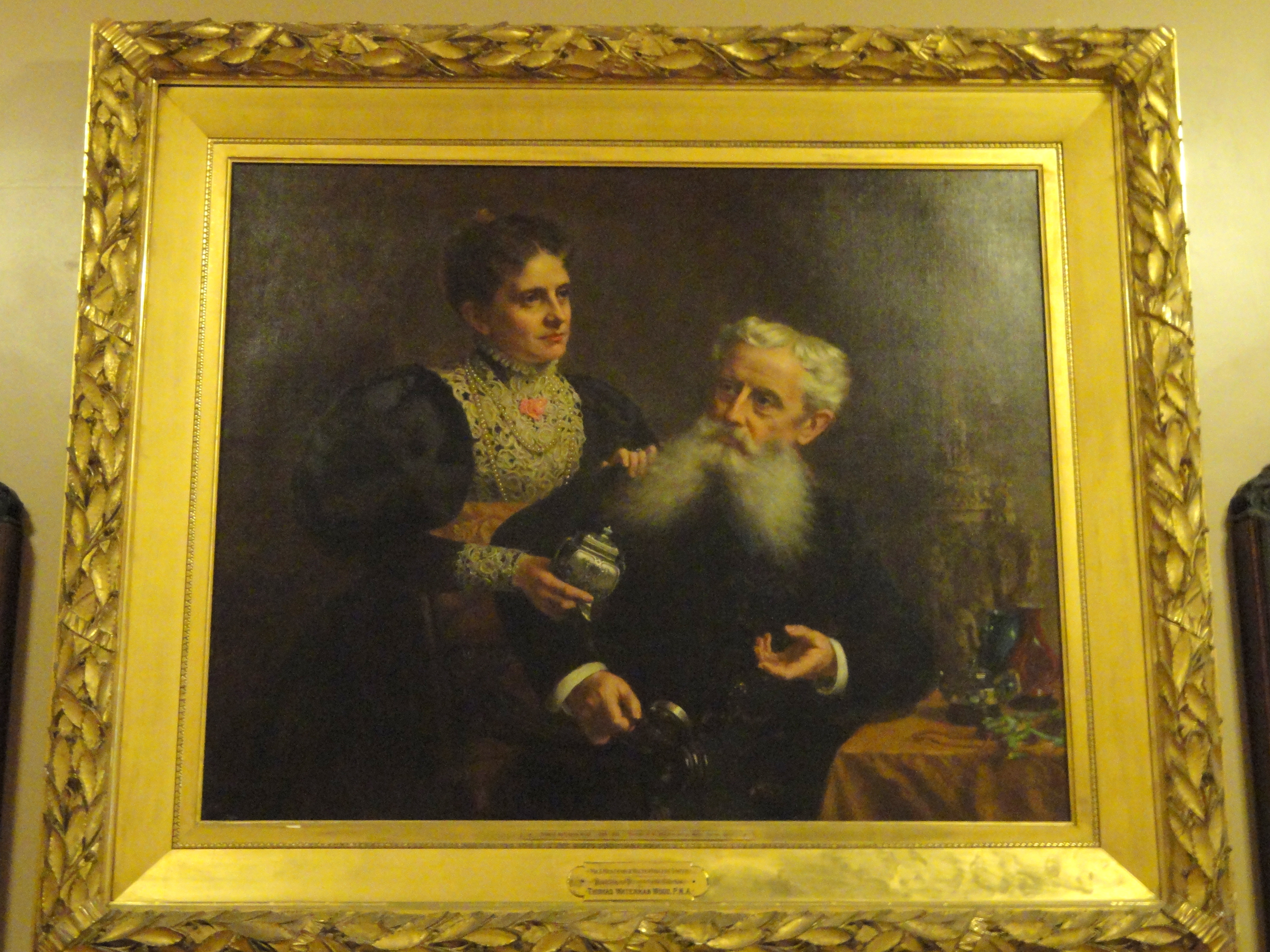
Portrait of the Smiths by Thomas Waterman Wood

George Walter Vincent Smith was born in 1832. In 1850, he entered the business world, first working at a fabric importation company in New York. He later became a partner in a carriage manufacturing company, through which he accumulated enough wealth to retire 1867. He began collecting art in the late 1850s, including a number of Japanese and Chinese armor, swords, cloisonné, carvings, and furniture. He moved to Springfield in 1871. In 1914, he was recorded as being a Republican and Episcopal. In 1915, he received the Pynchon Medal, an honor given to accomplished Springfield residents. He died in 1923, at which time he owned nearly 6,000 works of art.

Belle Townsley Smith was born in Springfield in 1845. She was also a collector, primarily interested in lace. She died in 1928.

The Smiths married on June 22, 1869. They lived in Venice for five years between 1882 and 1887.

The Smiths' ashes are interred on the museum's second floor.

== History ==
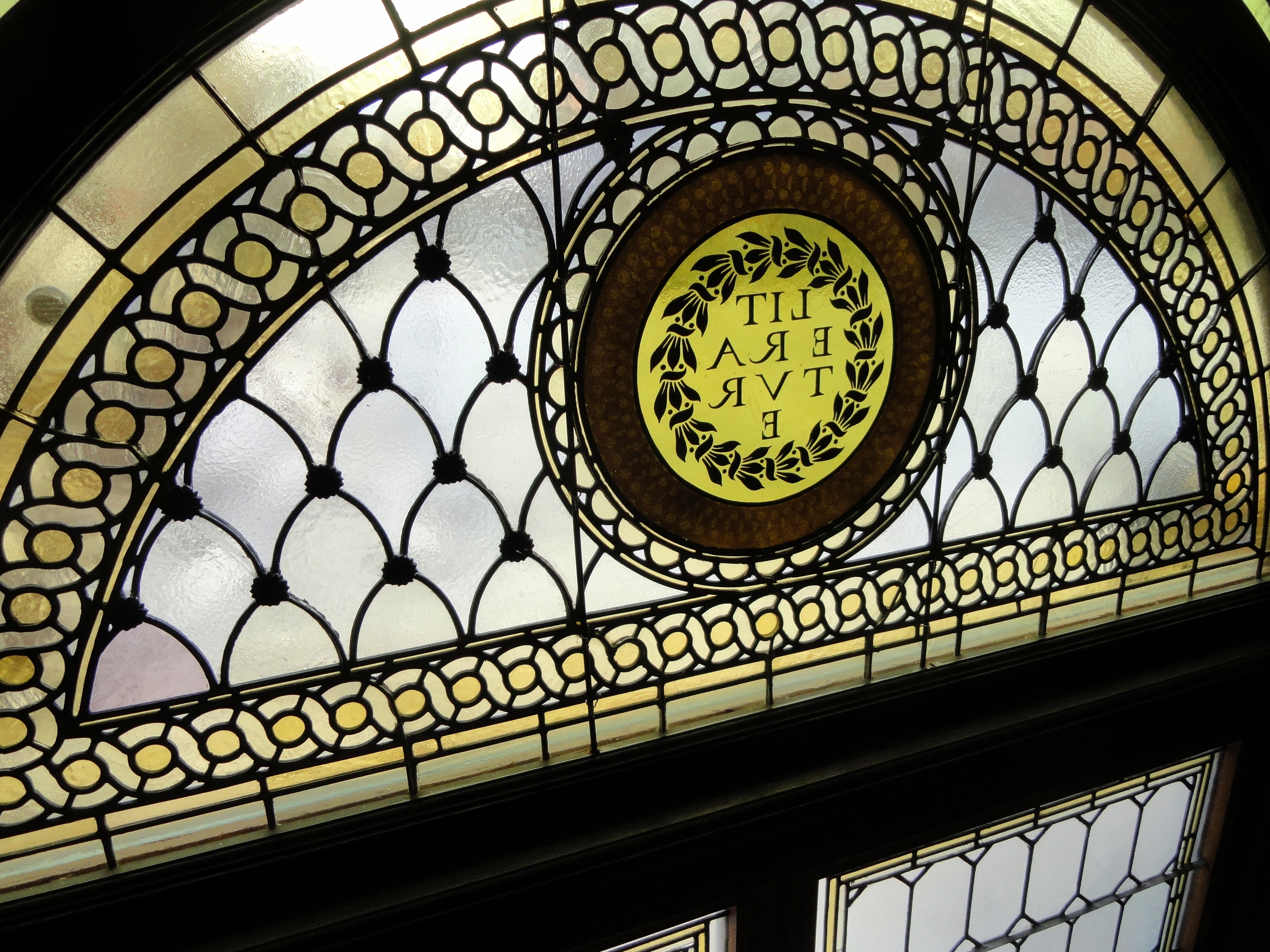
One of the museum's Tiffany windows

The Springfield Museums Association, a branch of the Springfield City Library Association, began raising money for an art museum after Smith promised the association his collection in 1889. The museum opened in 1895. At the time of its opening, the museum had Tiffany windows, fireproof walls, gas and electric lighting, and fourteen skylights. Today, the museum's Tiffany windows are the only such existing windows created specifically for a museum. The museum's exterior featured friezes on its southwest and front sides, which listed the names of great European and Japanese artists.

Rather than sort the museum's collections by region or era, Smith arranged the objects in displays that he found beautiful or striking. Several of the museum's display cabinets were made by George A. Schastey. The first floor held the Horace Smith Collection of Sculpture, which comprised casts of Greek and Renaissance sculptures, and two lecture halls. The second floor was dedicated to the Smith's own collections, which included the South Gallery, which had rugs from South and Central Asia, manuscripts, laces, and jade sculptures, the Armor Room, which held Samurai armor and weapons, the Picture Gallery, dedicated to paintings, and the North Gallery, dedicated to Japanese and Chinese bronzes.

In the late 1930s, the museum hosted a wood sculpture exhibition organized by the Works Projects Administration. In 1938, the museum hosted an exhibition of pieces by sculptor Alexander Calder.

The museum installed air conditioning in 2011, through a grant given by the National Endowment for the Humanities. 2011 also marked the beginning of a decade-long preservation project, which was completed in 2021. The project won the museum the Preservation Massachusetts' Paul & Niki Tsongas Award, and put the museum in the running for a People's Preservation Choice honor.

In 2015, the museum hosted an exhibition of sculptures by artist Gloria Garfinkel.

In 2020, the museum auctioned off twelve of its collection items through Christie's, a move which was criticized by the South China Morning Post, which suggested the items had not been acquired ethically by Smith and should be returned to China rather than auctioned off.

== Exhibits ==
The Ancient Treasures Gallery displays objects from ancient Egypt, China, Greece and Rome. The gallery also presents Greek and Roman sculpture from the recently acquired Blake/Purnell Collection of antiquities, and ancient Chinese ceramics and bronzes from the Bidwell Collection. Greek pottery and glass from the George Walter Vincent Smith Collection complement the classical sculptures.

The Japanese Arms and Armor Gallery, in addition to holding Smith's extensive collection of East Asian armor, is the site of an ornate Shinto wheel shrine carved during the late 18th and early 19th centuries. Among other collections is a 150-piece holding of Chinese cloisonné work, one of the most extensive collections outside of China.

The museum is also home to the George Walter Vincent Smith Art Museum Archives, which primarily focus on Springfield history.
