= Timo Weiland =

American fashion designer and disc jockey

Tim Weiland
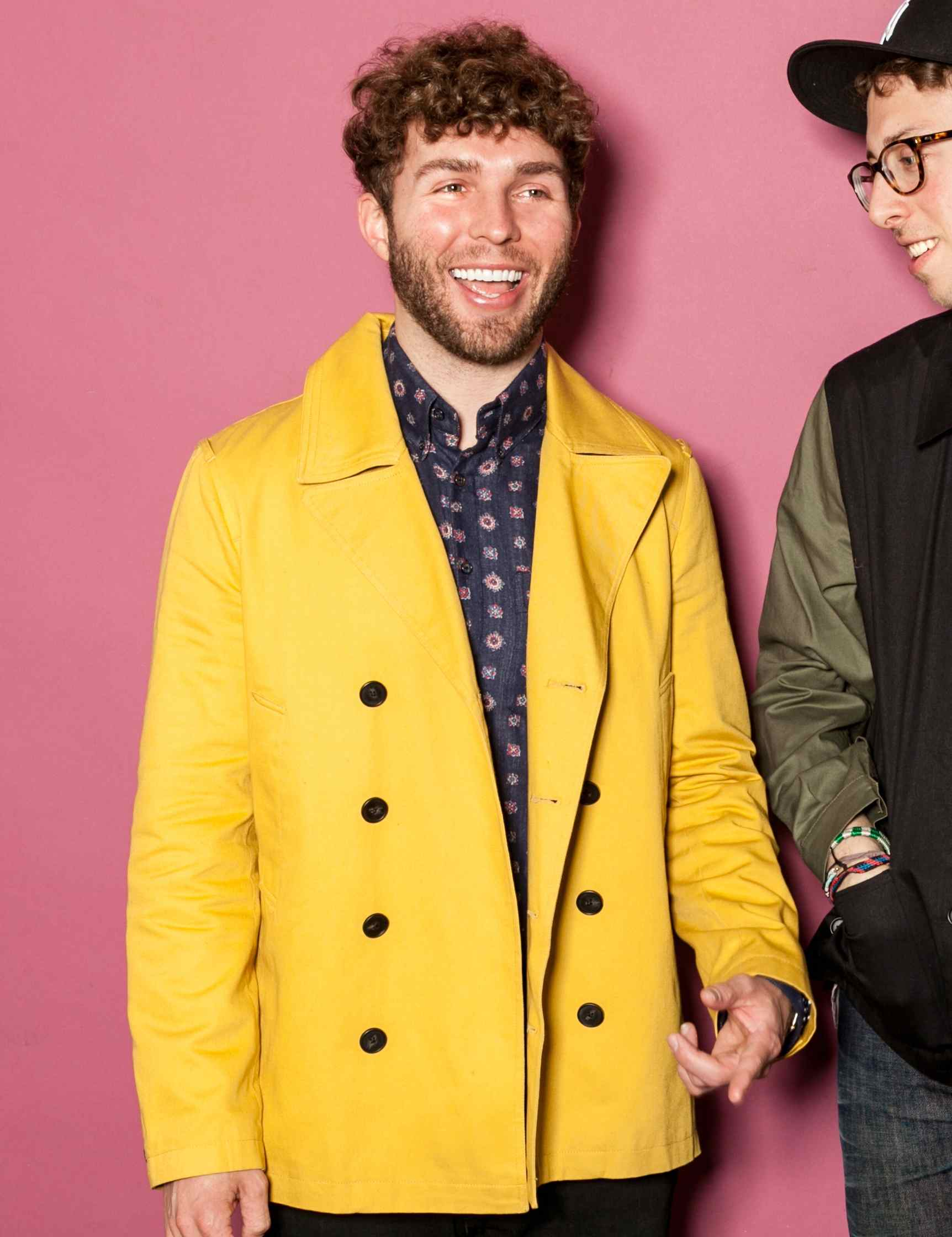
- Tim Weiland
- Born: Omaha
- Occupation(s): Fashion designer, DJ
- Website: www.timoweiland.com

Tim Weiland, popularly known as Timo Weiland, is an American fashion designer, disc jockey and entrepreneur, as well as the co-founder and creative director of the Timo Weiland brand.

== Biography ==
Timo Weiland was born in Omaha, Nebraska, and raised in Jacksonville, Florida. Weiland studied economics, Spanish literature, and business management at Vanderbilt University before moving to the fashion and design industry. When he graduated in 2006, he worked as a corporate analyst in investment banking for Deutsche Bank Securities, Inc. in New York City. In that same year, Weiland founded TIMO!, a collection of graphic wallets.

In 2009, Weiland co-founded a brand and business development consulting firm for startups. It was through this consulting venture that he met his business partner, Alan Eckstein. Weiland co-founded the clothing brand Timo Weiland with Alan Eckstein and Donna Kang.

Weiland, creative director of the Timo Weiland brand, and Eckstein, design director, climbed up the DJ circuit under the stage name "Timo+Alan" and have performed at New York City hotspots such as the Soho Grand Hotel, the Red Egg, The Brooklyn Museum, The Met, The Museum of Arts and Design, Jumpin Jack’s, David H. Koch Theater, and the Lincoln Center.

In the summer of 2018, Weiland cofounded The Lead, a vertical media company designed to help fashion and lifestyle retailers find business opportunities in the technology market. The Lead serves as a "bridge" between the fashion and technology communities by organizing events and producing a quarterly publication.

In January 2023, Weiland participated in a $2.5 million seed round for Brooklyn-based coffee concentrate startup, Explorer.

== Recognition for work in fashion ==
Style Caster called Tim Weiland one of the top ten breakout fashion designers of 2010. In 2011, Weiland was nominated for the Ecco Domani award for his women’s and men’s lines. Weiland was later selected to sit on the Council of Fashion Designers of America’s Fashion Incubator program alongside Christian Cota. Tim Weiland was also an International Woolmark prize finalist in 2013. In 2014, Weiland won the Ecco Domani Fashion Foundation Award. He was part of the 2012-14 Fashion Incubator Class, a business development program that supports the next generation of fashion designers in New York City. It was announced in September 2015 that Weiland would be working with Banana Republic to produce a capsule collection for the Spring 2016 line.

In 2016, Weiland's brand received the inaugural CFDA x Cadillac Retail lab grant of $75,000 and three months of retail space at Cadillac's world headquarters in New York City. Later that same year, Weiland's company was named the style director for Crowne Plaza and debuted a line of uniforms for the hotel chain. Weiland was recognized by Forbes for opening his first brick-and-mortar retail location in a partnership with Zenni Optical.
