= Jerome Chazen =

American businessman (1927–2022)

- Born: March 21, 1927; New York City, New York, U.S.
- Died: February 6, 2022 (aged 94); Upper Nyack, New York, U.S.
- Education: University of Wisconsin–Madison; Columbia Business School (M.B.A.)
- Known for: Co-founder of Liz Claiborne
- Spouse: Simona Chivian

Jerome A. Chazen (March 21, 1927 – February 6, 2022) was an American businessman who was the founder and chairman of Chazen Capital Partners. He was also one of four and last surviving founders of Liz Claiborne.

== Early life and career ==
Chazen was born to a Jewish family, in New York City, New York where his mother Rose was a seamstress, and his father David worked in commercial heating. and received a bachelor's degree in economics in 1948 from the University of Wisconsin–Madison where he was a member of Zeta Beta Tau fraternity and an MBA from Columbia Business School in 1950. He served in the Navy from 1945–46 and it was at UW-Madison where Chazen met his future wife, Simona, and Liz Claiborne co-founder Art Ortenberg.

Chazen's first job was as an analyst on Wall Street at Sutro Brothers before he transitioned to a career in fashion beginning with Rhea Midwest, an apparel manufacturer. In 1968, Chazen left his job at Winkelman's, where he was hired as a merchandising manager in 1960, for a job in fashion on the east coast.

In 1976, he co founded Liz Claiborne Inc with Liz Claiborne, her husband Art Ortenberg, and Leonard Boxer. Chazen was initially in charge of direct marketing operations. When Liz Claiborne retired from the company in 1989, Chazen was named Chairman of the company and also served as CEO. He was named chair emeritus upon his retirement in 1996. Chazen saw the company through a time that significantly changed what women wore to work.

Chazen wrote and published My Life at Liz Claiborne in 2012.

== Philanthropy ==
In 1991, Chazen donated $10 million to found The Chazen Institute of International Business at Columbia Business School and the Chazen Museum, formerly the Elvehjem Museum of Art, at the University of Wisconsin-Madison to which he and his wife also made donations of works of art.

Chazen served on the boards of the Newport Jazz and Louis Armstrong House and was chair emeritus at the Museum of Arts and Design.

== Personal life and death ==
He was married to Simona Chivian whom he met at the University of Wisconsin–Madison. They had three children, seven grandchildren and one great-grandson. He died at his home in Upper Nyack, NY on February 6, 2022, aged 94.
