= Alan Eckstein =

American fashion designer

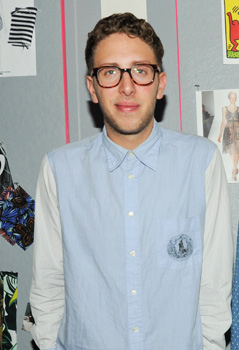
- Born: Great Neck, New York
- Education: Fashion Institute of Technology
- Occupations: Design director, Timo Weiland
- Known for: Co-founder of Timo Weiland
- Label: Timo Weiland

Alan Eckstein is an American fashion, furniture and interior designer. Eckstein is the co-founder and design director of the brand Timo Weiland, a men's and women's clothing line founded by Eckstein, Tim Weiland, and Donna Kang. In 2014, Eckstein and the Timo Weiland designers won the Ecco Domani Fashion Foundation award for the menswear category. Forbes ranked Eckstein as one of the top 30 Under 30 in the category of Art and Style.

== Early life and education ==
Alan Eckstein was born and raised in Great Neck, New York. Originally, Eckstein attended university to study music with a focus on jazz history. Before completing a degree, Eckstein left school and enrolled at New York's Fashion Institute of Technology (FIT). Eckstein was studying communications at FIT when he met fellow student Donna Kang and he was later introduced to Tim Weiland. While still a student at FIT, Eckstein was in class when he first found out Women's Wear Daily (WWD) had featured Timo Weiland designs on the front page of its magazine.

== Fashion career ==
Eckstein started a men's fashion line called Epic Firm while he was attending FIT. After he met Tim Weiland, they decided to collaborate and change the brand to Timo Weiland. In 2009, Eckstein, Weiland, and Kang launched the Timo Weiland neckwear collection. The neckwear line debuted at MILK Studios and was later featured on the cover of WWD magazine. Shortly after, the design trio expanded the line to a full men's and women's wear brand.

Through Timo Weiland, Eckstein, Weiland and Kang have collaborated with brands such as Anthropologie, Urban Outfitters, Champion Athletics and Topman. The line has been sold in Barneys, a high-end department store in New York City, since 2010 and is also available at stores such as Saks Fifth Avenue. In 2011, Eckstein and Weiland were selected to be a part of the Council of Fashion Designers of America's 2012-2014 Fashion Incubator program.

== Personal life ==
Alan Eckstein has described his own style as: "Quirky, tailored, effortless," and cites his main design inspiration as the streets of New York. Eckstein has a mini dachshund named Coconut that he said helped inspire sweaters with the dachshund motif in Timo Weiland's Fall 2014 collection, and is the namesake of one of the brand's best-selling sweaters.

Eckstein and Weiland perform as DJs under the stage name "Timo+Alan," and have performed at New York City venues such as the Soho Grand Hotel, the Boom Boom Room, The Jane Hotel, the Rubin Museum of Art, the Red Egg, The Brooklyn Museum, The Met, The Museum of Arts and Design, Jumpin Jack's, David H. Koch Theater, and the Lincoln Center.

== See also ==
- Timo Weiland (brand)
