= Zenni Optical =

American online retailer of prescription glasses and sunglasses

- Formerly: 19dollareyeglasses.com
- Type: Private
- Industry: Online shopping
- Founded: 2003; 23 years ago in California
- Founders: Tibor Láczay; Julia Zhen
- Headquarters: Novato, California, United States
- Key people: Julia Zhen (CEO); Duc Hang (CTO)
- Products: Prescription glasses; Sunglasses; Contact lenses
- Website: www.zennioptical.com

Zenni Optical (formerly 19dollareyeglasses.com) is an American online retailer of prescription glasses and sunglasses. Founded in 2003 by Tibor Laczay and Julia Zhen, it is based in Novato, California.

The company sells more than 2,000 types of prescription glasses and sunglasses as well as 45 types of contact lenses. Zenni created theme glasses through collaborations with professional gamers, sportspeople, the designer Iris Apfel and the actress Rashida Jones. It is able to keep costs low by selling its own brand of frames instead of name brands, manufacturing frames in China in a Danyang factory. Reviewers praised Zenni for its low prices, diversity of options, and having sturdy glasses for children. After trying Zenni glasses, Los Angeles Times consumer columnist David Lazarus found the "overall quality was pretty good" but his frames did not fit well and needed to be adjusted by an optician, while Reviewed's Madison Durham said the glasses' prescription did not match the standard of competitors'. Reviewers found Zenni's return policy to be inferior compared to competitors.

== History ==
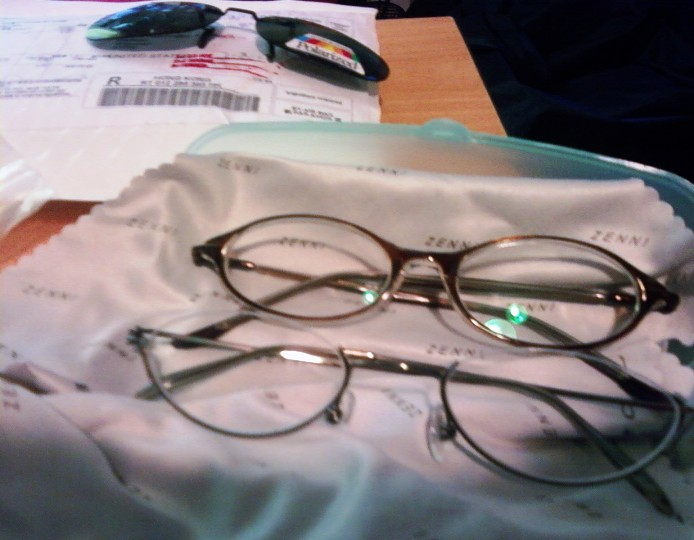
Zenni Optical mail order

Zenni Optical was founded in 2003 by Tibor Laczay and Julia Zhen. Before being renamed to Zenni Optical when it began offering $7 and $8 glasses, the company was named 19dollareyeglasses.com. Around 2014, co-founder Zhen acquired the building occupied by the Marin Independent Journal to house Zenni. The company is based in Novato, California, where it employed 100 people in 2020. It has 1,000 employees at its 248,000-square-foot Chinese factory in Danyang, Jiangsu. The company operates a California warehouse to support West Coast orders. In 2020, it purchased a building in Obetz, Ohio, to act as a lab that molds lenses for frames and employed nearly 100 people there by the end of 2022. The Ohio facility is twice as large as the California one. In 2022, robots took the place of some workers at Zenni's Novato facility. The robots checked a glasses' color and shape to confirm it is assigned to the right customer's bag.

At the beginning of the 2018–19 NBA season, Zenni's name started being featured on the left side of the Chicago Bulls jersey. The company inked an agreement with the NBA team that lasted five years, allowing it to become the first brand featured on the Bulls' jersey patch. Bulls team members Ryan Arcidiacono, Wendell Carter Jr., and Zach LaVine became Zenni ambassadors. The company released an ad during Super Bowl LIV in February 2020 that featured George Kittle, a San Francisco 49ers tight end. A number of customers who visited their website after seeing the commercial encountered a message that eyeglasses deliveries would be delayed for between three and four weeks owing to the government's required suspension of factory work in response to the COVID-19 pandemic in mainland China.

In 2013, Zenni had average daily sales of 3,500 glasses, which the San Francisco Chronicle said made it "one of the largest online purveyors of eyewear in the world". In 2019, the company sold almost six million glasses. Zenni had $390 million in revenue in 2021 and in 2022 had sold 45 million glasses starting from its founding.

== Website and products ==
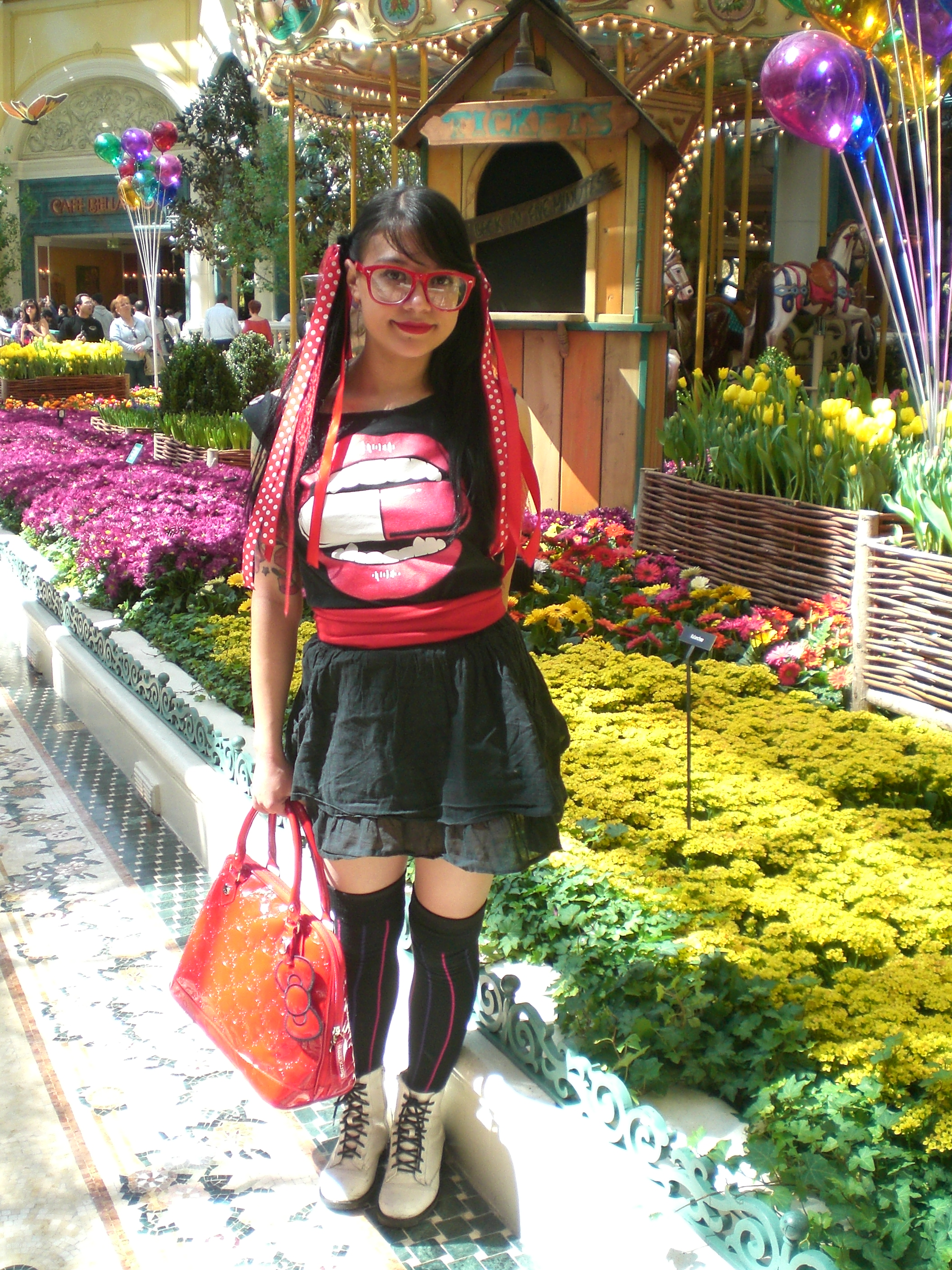
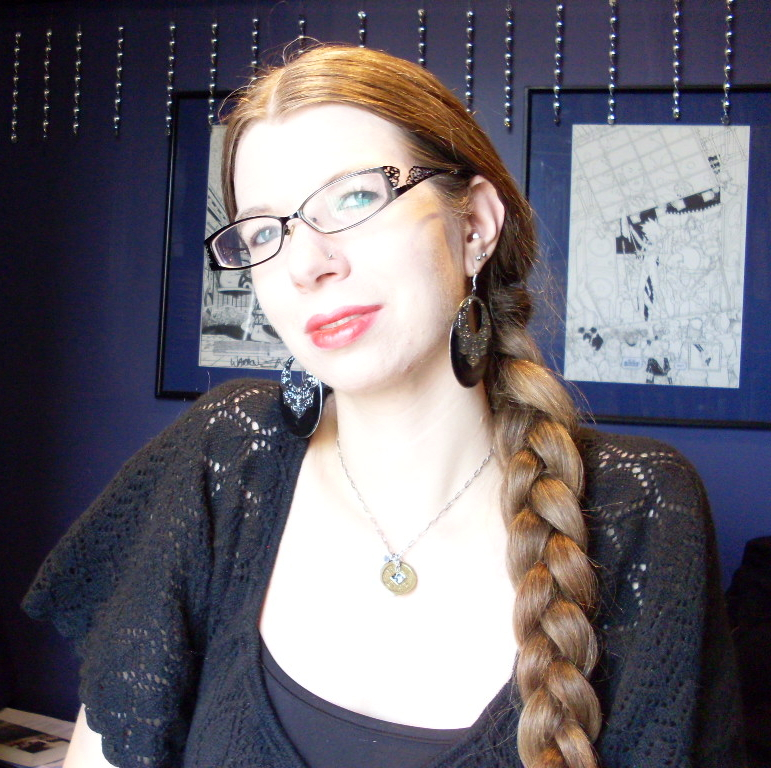
Two individuals wearing Zenni Optical eyeglasses

The company sells glasses and sunglasses on the Internet only. It sells 2,300 frames and supports progressive lens and bifocals. Zenni began selling contact lenses in 2024, offering 45 types at launch. It is able to keep costs down compared to glasses specialty stores by offering brands they have created instead of name brands. The company's designers create every glasses frame sold on its website. The designers work with professional gamers and people in sports halls of fame to create themed glasses. Customers can add a tailor-made etching to the glasses' arm. The company offers prescription safety glasses marketed for people studying science and collaborated with Rashida Jones for a line she organizes. It has a four-year contract with the designer Iris Apfel to create a line of glasses. Zenni offers a collection of glasses constructed entirely from recycled plastic. It distributes some money made from sales of that collection, "ReMakes by Zenni", to One Percent for the Planet and the Wyland Foundation, two non-profit organizations focused on the environment.

The company's blog features listicles and articles that discuss their products, arranging them by popular-culture occurrences and various subject matter such as Harry Potter houses and the zodiac. The website allows users to select frames by size, shape, color, and material. Zenni tracks their users' frame choices in an Oracle database to give the company a better idea of the inventory it needs to maintain. It provides a widget that allows customers to do an online fitting of eyeglass frames. The first option is Zenni Frame Fit. After transferring their photo to the website, a user can put a frame on their face. The second option is 3D Try-On in which users generate a 3-D rendering of their face, giving them the opportunity to observe their glasses-adorned face from different perspectives. Writing in Reviewed, Madison Durham said the Try-On "works, but ultimately wasn't as comprehensive or workable as others we've tried".

To order glasses, customers need to provide their eyeglass prescription and a measurement of their pupillary distance (PD). Zenni has a web page that supports measuring the PD. Columnist Mary Hunt praised Zenni for offering "the absolute cheapest prices on plastic frames" and said it has "a wide range of frame styles and lens options". All glasses delivered to customers are accompanied by a glasses holder and a cloth for cleaning. The company's products have a warranty of 30 days in which they can receive either a 100% credit to be used to purchase other products or 50% of their money back. The health website Everyday Health said "the return policy for Zenni orders isn't as competitive as other retailers' return policies" and Wirecutter said the retailer has "an inferior return policy". Authors Daniel Padgett and Andrew Loos said that Zenni competitor Warby Parker allows customers to ship and return products without charge whereas Zenni is "less lenient".

== Reception ==
Columnist Mary Hunt said in 2022 that "while in the past Zenni has fallen short for its customer service, the company has really stepped it up in recent years". On a report for purchasing glasses, the consumer organization Consumer Reports placed Zenni in the third position behind Costco's Costco Optical and Warby Parker. Kiplinger's Personal Finance's Ryan Wilk in 2009 called Zenni's website "usable but [a] downright eyesore". Wilk purchased glasses from Zenni and compared them to those he could have gotten from Oliver Peoples which would have cost several hundred more. He said, "My pair was not as sturdy as the Peoples pair, but they looked just as sharp, and I could see just fine." According to the Wirecutter, "Despite Zenni's ultra-low prices, we found that it surpassed our expectations, sometimes impressively so."

Reviewed's Madison Durham criticized Zenni for being "a bit low on amenities" when contrasted with competitors and said glasses for competitors had a better prescription standard compared to the glasses she received from Zenni. She praised it for having "awesome product lines available for kids and teens". She said the teen glasses frames "managed to be trendy without trying too hard" and lauded how the kids' products were very sturdy glasses "that's designed to move as they move and stand up to play". StyleCaster's Kristen Bousquet wrote, "Does a lower price point mean lower quality? And with Zenni, it actually didn't. I was genuinely surprised to find that Zenni's frames held up to my day-to-day manhandling as well as the other frames I tested for this piece." Popular Mechanics's Eleanor Hildebrandt said that the outlet is a good option for people who frequently damage their glasses.

Clark Howard said Zenni eyeglasses have such low prices for two reasons: Zenni manufactures them in China and once the glasses are sold, there is no customer service. He said the latter reason has "led some of my listeners to become disenchanted with Zenni" though he said he did not have issues through several purchases through Zenni." Los Angeles Times consumer columnist David Lazarus wrote in 2019 of Zenni, "The more you rely on complex lenses, premium coatings and prisms, the more of a risk you'll face that things might not work out." He noted that the company was unable to support his prescription that required both prism correction and progressive lens so he had to purchase two glasses. After receiving the glasses, Lazarus found that the frames "had looked pretty cool online [but] appeared a bit cheaper in person". He found that the "overall quality was pretty good" even though he had to ask his optician to alter the frames since they had trouble fitting properly.
