= George Kittle =

American football player (born 1993)

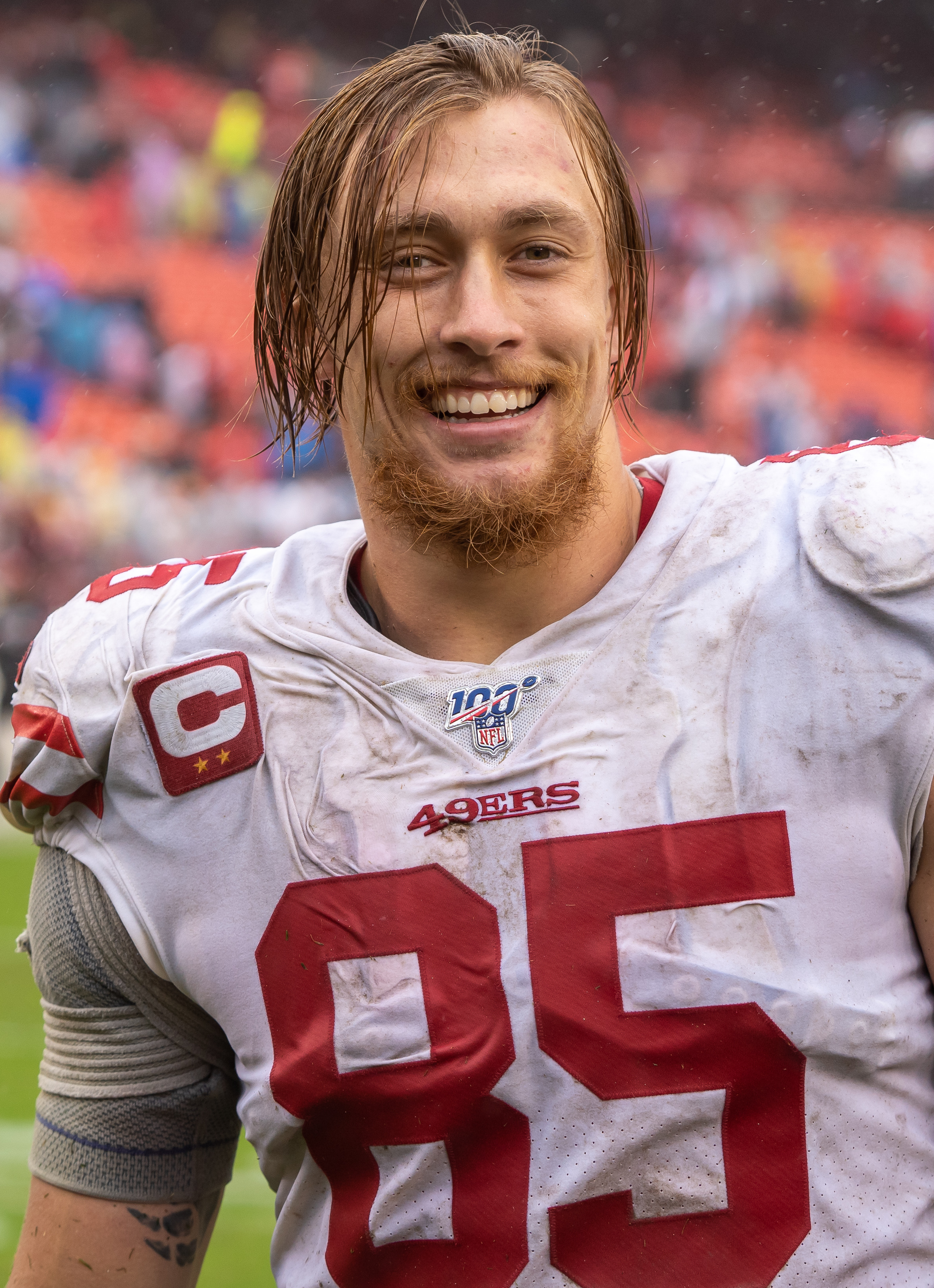
- Kittle with the San Francisco 49ers in 2019

No. 85 – San Francisco 49ers
- Position: Tight end
- Roster status: Active

Personal information
- Born: October 9, 1993 (age 33); Madison, Wisconsin, U.S.
- Listed height: 6 ft 4 in (1.93 m)
- Listed weight: 250 lb (113 kg)

Career information
- High school: Norman (Norman, Oklahoma)
- College: Iowa (2012–2016)
- NFL draft: 2017: 5th round, 146th overall pick

Career history
- San Francisco 49ers (2017–present)

Awards and highlights
- 2× First-team All-Pro (2019, 2023); 3× Second-team All-Pro (2018, 2022, 2024); 7× Pro Bowl (2018, 2019, 2021–2025)

Career NFL statistics as of Week 10, 2026
- Receptions: 639
- Receiving yards: 8,565
- Receiving touchdowns: 57
- Stats at Pro Football Reference

George Krieger Kittle (born October 9, 1993) is an American professional football tight end for the San Francisco 49ers of the National Football League (NFL). He played college football for the Iowa Hawkeyes and was selected by the 49ers in the fifth round of the 2017 NFL draft. Kittle is a seven-time Pro Bowler and was a first-team All-Pro in 2019 and 2023.

== Early life ==
Kittle was born on October 9, 1993, in Madison, Wisconsin, and moved to Iowa in 2000. He attended Iowa City West High School in Iowa City, Iowa; Cedar Falls High School in Cedar Falls, Iowa; and Norman High School in Norman, Oklahoma. Kittle committed to the University of Iowa to play college football. His father, Bruce, was a four-year letterman and co-captain of the 1982 Rose Bowl squad at Iowa and is a former college football coach. His mother, Jan Krieger, is in the Iowa Girls’ High School Athletic Union Hall of Fame and played softball and earned All-America honors in basketball at Drake University.

== College career ==
Kittle played at Iowa from 2012 to 2016 under head coach Kirk Ferentz. As a freshman, Kittle had a limited role behind senior C. J. Fiedorowicz, junior Ray Hamilton, and sophomore Jake Duzey. He had his first collegiate reception, which went for 47 yards, against the Missouri State Bears. Overall, Kittle caught five passes for 108 yards.

Iowa's tight end unit remained crowded for Kittle in the 2014 season. Along with the return of Hamilton and Duzey, junior Henry Krieger-Coble added to the depth. Kittle had a lone reception for 25 yards against Maryland as his only catch of the season.

Kittle's role expanded in the 2015 season. On September 26, 2015, against North Texas, he scored his first collegiate touchdown on a 43-yard reception from quarterback C. J. Beathard. Overall, Kittle had 20 receptions for 290 yards and six touchdowns in the 2015 season. His six receiving touchdowns ranked sixth in the Big Ten Conference.

As a senior in 2016, Kittle headlined a tight end unit that contained junior Peter Pekar and freshman Noah Fant. He had his best statistical game against North Dakota State with five receptions for 110 yards. In his senior season, Kittle recorded 22 receptions for 314 yards and four touchdowns.

During his collegiate career, Kittle had 48 receptions for 737 yards and 10 touchdowns.

== Professional career ==
=== Pre-draft ===
As a top tight end prospect, Kittle was one of 19 collegiate tight ends to receive an invitation to the NFL Scouting Combine in Indianapolis, Indiana. He completed the majority of drills, but opted to skip the short shuttle and three-cone drill. Kittle's overall performance was well received, as he finished third among tight ends in the broad jump, fifth in the 40-yard dash, and finished sixth among his position group in the vertical jump. On March 27, 2017, Kittle participated at Iowa's Pro Day, along with C. J. Beathard, Desmond King, Jaleel Johnson, Greg Mabin, Riley McCarron, and four other prospects. He completed his combine drills, finishing the short shuttle (4.55s), three-cone drill, and also ran positional drills. Scouts and team representatives from all 32 NFL teams attended, including Cincinnati Bengals tight end coach Jonathan Hayes. At the conclusion of the pre-draft process, Kittle was projected to be a third or fourth round pick by NFL draft experts and scouts. He was ranked the fifth best tight end prospect in the draft by NFL analystMike Mayock, the sixth best by NFL analyst Gil Brandt, and the eighth best tight end by NFLDraftScout.com.

Pre-draft measurables
Height	Weight	Arm length	Hand span	Wingspan	40-yard dash	10-yard split	20-yard split	20-yard shuttle	Three-cone drill	Vertical jump	Broad jump	Bench press
6 ft 3 3/4 in (1.92 m)	247 lb (112 kg)	33 1/8 in (0.84 m)	9 1/4 in (0.23 m)	6 ft 6 3/4 in (2.00 m)	4.52 s	1.51 s	2.65 s	4.55 s	7.00 s	38.5 in (0.98 m)	11 ft 0 in (3.35 m)	18 reps
All values from NFL Combine/Pro Day

External videos
- 49ers draft George Kittle 146th overall

=== 2017 season ===
The San Francisco 49ers selected Kittle in the fifth round (146th overall) of the 2017 NFL draft. He was reunited with Iowa teammate C. J. Beathard, whom the 49ers drafted in the third round (104th overall). On May 4, 2017, the 49ers signed Kittle to a four-year, $2.69 million contract that included a signing bonus of $298,287.

Throughout training camp, Kittle competed against Garrett Celek, Vance McDonald, Logan Paulsen, Blake Bell, and Cole Hikutini for the job as the starting tight end. Head coach Kyle Shanahan named Kittle the starting tight end to start the regular season.

Kittle made his NFL debut in the season-opener against the Carolina Panthers and caught five passes for 27 yards during the 23–3 loss. He caught his first NFL reception on a 13-yard pass from Brian Hoyer on the first drive and was tackled by Panthers' safety Mike Adams. During a Week 5 26–23 overtime road loss to the Indianapolis Colts, Kittle had seven receptions for 83 yards and his first NFL touchdown. During Week 9 against the Arizona Cardinals, Kittle caught three passes for 27 yards before leaving the eventual 20–10 loss with a leg injury. He was inactive due to the injury and missed the next game against the New York Giants.

During a Week 16 44–33 victory over the Jacksonville Jaguars, Kittle caught three passes for 42 yards and his second touchdown of the season. In the regular-season finale against the Los Angeles Rams, he had his first 100-yard receiving game during the 34–13 road victory, finishing with four receptions for 100 yards.

Kittle finished his rookie year with 43 receptions for 515 yards and two touchdowns in 15 games and seven starts.

=== 2018 season ===
During the season-opening 24–16 road loss to the Minnesota Vikings, Kittle had five receptions for 90 yards. Two weeks later against the Kansas City Chiefs, he caught five passes for 79 yards in the 38–27 road loss. In the next game against the Los Angeles Chargers, Kittle recorded six receptions for 125 yards and an 82-yard touchdown during the narrow 29–27 road loss.

During Week 7 against the Rams, Kittle recorded five receptions for 98 yards and a touchdown in the 39–10 loss. Two weeks later against the Oakland Raiders on Thursday Night Football, he caught four passes for 108 yards and a touchdown in the 34–3 blowout victory. In the next game against the Giants on Monday Night Football, Kittle had nine receptions for 83 yards during the 27–23 loss.

During a Week 14 20–14 victory over the Denver Broncos, Kittle set a franchise record for receiving yards by a tight end with 210 on seven receptions, all coming in the first half, as well as becoming the first 49ers tight end to surpass 1,000 receiving yards. Two weeks later against the Chicago Bears, he was the leading receiver with seven receptions for 74 yards in the 14–9 loss. In the regular season finale against the Rams, Kittle recorded nine receptions for 149 yards and a touchdown during the 48–32 road loss. He broke Travis Kelce's single-season receiving yards record for a tight end, less than an hour after Kelce broke the record.

Kittle finished his second professional season with 88 receptions for 1,377 yards and five touchdowns in 16 games and starts. He was named as a Pro Bowler for the first time. Kittle was ranked 29th by his fellow players on the NFL Top 100 Players of 2019.

=== 2019 season ===
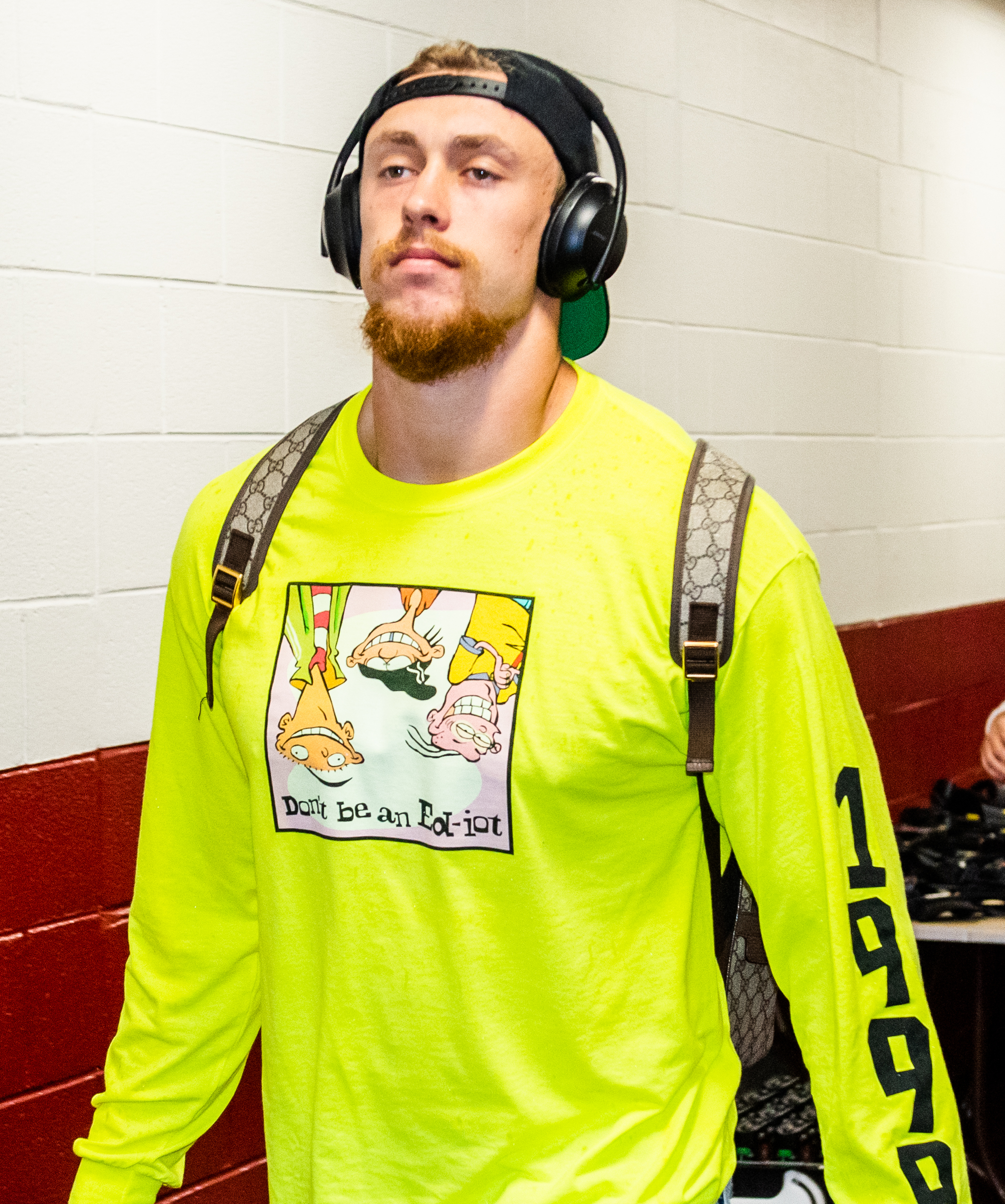
Kittle in 2019

Through the first four weeks of 2019 NFL season, during which the 49ers played the Tampa Bay Buccaneers, Cincinnati Bengals, and Pittsburgh Steelers, Kittle earned the highest overall Pro Football Focus grade of any player in the NFL.

Following a Week 4 bye, the 49ers faced the Cleveland Browns at home on Monday Night Football. Kittle finished the 31–3 victory with six receptions for 70 yards and his first touchdown of the season. In the next game against the Rams, Kittle recorded eight receptions for 103 yards during the 20–7 road victory. Three weeks later against the Cardinals, Kittle suffered a knee injury on the first play of the game and was forced to miss the next few plays before returning to the game and catching six passes for 79 yards and a touchdown in the 28–25 road victory. However, he missed the next two games due to the injury.

Kittle returned from injury in time for the Week 12 matchup against the Green Bay Packers on Sunday Night Football. He finished the 37–8 victory with six receptions for 129 yards and a touchdown. Two weeks later against the New Orleans Saints, Kittle recorded six receptions for 67 yards and a touchdown, including a crucial 4th-and-2 catch that went for 39 yards, 17 of which he made while being face-masked by Saints cornerback Marcus Williams while carrying two other defenders. The catch set up the game-winning field goal as the 49ers narrowly won on the road 48–46. In the next game against the Atlanta Falcons, Kittle caught 13 passes for 134 yards during the 29–22 loss. Following the loss, he was named to his second Pro Bowl with over 340,000 votes. During a Week 16 34–31 comeback victory over the Rams, Kittle had five receptions for 79 yards and a touchdown.

Kittle finished the 2019 season with 85 receptions for 1,053 yards and five touchdowns in 14 games and starts. He was named as a First Team All-Pro for the 2019 season. The 49ers finished atop the NFC West with a 13–3 record and earned the #1-seed in the NFC. In the Divisional Round against the Vikings, Kittle recorded three receptions for 16 yards during the 27–10 victory. During the NFC Championship Game against the Packers, he had a 19-yard reception in the 37–20 victory as the 49ers advanced to Super Bowl LIV. In the Super Bowl against the Chiefs, Kittle caught four passes for 36 yards during the 31–20 loss. He was ranked seventh by his fellow players on the NFL Top 100 Players of 2020.

=== 2020 season ===
On August 13, 2020, Kittle signed a five-year, $75 million contract with the 49ers with an $18 million signing bonus, making him the highest-paid tight end in the league.

After missing two games due to a knee injury, Kittle returned in Week 4 against the Philadelphia Eagles on Sunday Night Football and finished the 25–20 loss with 15 receptions for 183 yards and a touchdown. Two weeks later against the Rams on Sunday Night Football, he had seven receptions for 109 yards and a touchdown in the 24–16 victory. On November 5, Kittle was placed on injured reserve with a broken bone in his foot. He was activated on December 25. The next day against the Cardinals, Kittle was the leading receiver with four receptions for 92 yards in the 20–12 road victory.

Kittle finished the 2020 season with 48 receptions for 634 yards and two touchdowns in eight games and starts. He was ranked 50th by his fellow players on the NFL Top 100 Players of 2021.

=== 2021 season ===
Kittle began the season recording four receptions for 78 yards during the season-opening 41–33 road victory over the Detroit Lions. Two weeks later against the Packers on Sunday Night Football, he was the leading receiver with seven receptions for 92 yards in the narrow 30–28 loss.

On October 9, 2021, Kittle was placed on injured reserve with a calf injury. He was activated on November 6. The next day, Kittle caught six passes for 101 yards and a touchdown in a 31–17 loss to the Cardinals. In the next game against the Rams on Monday Night Football, he recorded five receptions for 50 yards and a touchdown during the 31–10 victory. The following week against the Jaguars, Kittle had four receptions for 34 yards and a touchdown in the 30–10 road victory.

During a Week 13 30–23 road loss to the Seattle Seahawks, Kittle caught nine passes for 181 yards and two touchdowns. In the next game against the Bengals, he had 13 receptions for 151 yards and a touchdown during the 26–23 road victory. Kittle was named NFC Offensive Player of the Week for his performance. The following week against the Falcons, he was the leading receiver with six receptions for 93 yards in the 31–13 victory.

Kittle finished the 2021 season with 71 receptions for 910 yards and six touchdowns in 14 games and starts. He earned his third career Pro Bowl nomination. The 49ers finished third in the NFC West with a 10–7 record and qualified for the playoffs as the #6-seed. During the Wild Card Round against the Dallas Cowboys, Kittle had an 18-yard reception in the 23–17 road victory. In the Divisional Round against the Packers, he recorded four receptions for 63 yards during the 13–10 comeback road victory. During the NFC Championship Game against the Rams, Kittle caught two passes for 27 yards and his first career postseason touchdown in the 20–17 road loss. Kittle was ranked 22nd by his fellow players on the NFL Top 100 Players of 2022.

=== 2022 season ===
Kittle missed the first two games of the season with a groin injury. He made his season debut in Week 3 against the Broncos on Sunday Night Football and finished the narrow 11–10 road loss with four receptions for 28 yards.

During Week 7 against the Chiefs, Kittle had six receptions for 98 yards and his first touchdown of the season in the 44–23 loss. In the next game against the Rams, he caught three passes for 39 yards and a touchdown during the 31–14 road victory. Three weeks later against the Cardinals at Estadio Azteca in Mexico on Monday Night Football, Kittle recorded four receptions for 84 yards and two touchdowns in the 38–10 victory.

During a Week 15 21–13 road victory over the Seahawks on Thursday Night Football, Kittle caught four passes for 93 yards and two touchdowns. In the next game against the Washington Commanders, he recorded six receptions for 120 yards and two touchdowns. The following week against the Las Vegas Raiders, Kittle had four receptions for 23 yards and a touchdown in the 37–34 overtime road victory. During the regular season finale against the Cardinals, he caught four passes for 29 yards and two touchdowns in the 38–13 victory.

Kittle finished the 2022 season with 60 receptions for 765 yards and a career-high 11 touchdowns in 15 games and starts. He tied for third in the NFL in receiving touchdowns. Kittle received his fourth Pro Bowl nomination in 2022, tying Brent Jones' franchise record for total career Pro Bowl selections by a tight end. The 49ers finished atop the NFC West with a 13–4 record and qualified for the playoffs as the #2-seed. During the Wild Card Round against the Seahawks, Kittle caught two passes for 37 yards in the 41–23 victory. In the Divisional Round against the Cowboys, he was the leading receiver with five receptions for 95 yards. During the NFC Championship Game against the Eagles, Kittle had three receptions for 32 yards in the 31–7 road loss. He was ranked 19th by his fellow players on the NFL Top 100 Players of 2023.

=== 2023 season ===
During a Week 2 30–23 road victory over the Rams, Kittle passed 400 receptions in only 84 games, the shortest time to get to 400 receptions in 49ers franchise history, and the fourth-shortest time to do so in NFL history. In the next game against the Giants on Thursday Night Football, he had seven receptions for 90 yards in the 30–12 victory. Two weeks later against the Cowboys on Sunday Night Football, Kittle recorded three receptions for 67 yards, all for touchdowns, in the 42–10 victory.

During Week 7 against the Vikings on Monday Night Football, Kittle was the leading receiver with five receptions for 78 yards in the 22–17 road loss. In the next game against the Bengals, he had nine receptions for 149 yards during the 31–17 loss. Following a Week 9 bye, the 49ers went on the road to face the Jaguars. Kittle finished the 34–3 blowout victory with three receptions for 116 yards and a touchdown. The following week against the Buccaneers, he caught eight passes for 89 yards and a touchdown in the 27–14 victory.

During a Week 14 28–16 victory over the Seahawks, Kittle recorded three receptions for 76 yards and a touchdown. Two weeks later against the Baltimore Ravens on Christmas Day, he had seven receptions for 126 yards in the 33–19 loss.

Kittle finished the 2023 season with 65 receptions for 1,020 yards and six touchdowns in 16 games and starts. He was selected to his fifth career Pro Bowl, breaking the franchise record for total career Pro Bowl selections by a tight end. Kittle also earned first team All-Pro honors for the second time. The 49ers finished atop the NFC West with a 12–5 record and earned the #1-seed in the NFC. In the Divisional Round against the Packers, Kittle had four receptions for 81 yards and a touchdown during the 24–21 victory. During the Divisional Round against the Lions, he caught two passes for 27 yards in the 34–31 comeback victory as the 49ers advanced to Super Bowl LVIII. In the Super Bowl against the Chiefs, Kittle recorded two receptions for four yards before suffering a shoulder injury during the third minute of overtime and went to the locker room for the rest of the 25–22 loss. He was ranked 14th by his fellow players on the NFL Top 100 Players of 2024.

=== 2024 season ===
During a Week 2 23–17 road loss to the Vikings, Kittle had seven receptions for 76 yards and his first touchdown of the season. Two weeks later against the New England Patriots, he recorded four receptions for 45 yards and a touchdown in the 30–13 victory. In the next game against the Cardinals, Kittle caught eight passes for 64 yards and a touchdown during the narrow 24–23 loss.

During Week 6 against the Seahawks on Thursday Night Football, Kittle recorded five receptions for 58 yards and two touchdowns in the 36–24 road victory. In the next game against the Chiefs, he was the leading receiver with six receptions for 92 yards during the 28–18 loss. The following week against the Cowboys on Sunday Night Football, Kittle caught six passes for 128 yards and a touchdown in the 30–24 victory.

Following a Week 9 bye, the 49ers went on the road to face the Buccaneers. Kittle finished the 23–20 victory with three receptions for 57 yards and a touchdown. However, he missed the next game against the Seahawks due to a hamstring injury. Kittle returned the following week against the Packers and caught six passes for 82 yards and a touchdown in the 38–10 road loss.

During a Week 14 38–13 victory over the Bears, Kittle had six receptions for 151 yards. Two weeks later against the Miami Dolphins, he caught eight passes for 106 yards in the 29–17 road loss. In the next game against the Lions on Monday Night Football, Kittle recorded eight receptions for 112 yards during the 40–34 loss.

Kittle finished the 2024 season with 78 receptions for 1,106 yards and eight touchdowns in 15 games and starts. He earned Pro Bowl honors for the sixth time. Kittle also registered four games with over 100 receiving yards, the most by any tight end in the NFL. His receiving yards mark his fourth career and second-consecutive 1,000-yard season, while his four career 1,000-yard seasons were the third-most in franchise history and tied for the second-most by a tight end in NFL history, only behind Travis Kelce. Kittle was ranked 31st by his fellow players on the NFL Top 100 Players of 2025.

=== 2025 season ===
On April 29, 2025, the 49ers and Kittle agreed to a four-year, $76.4 million contract extension with $40 million guaranteed. The contract averaged $19.1 million per year, making him the highest-paid tight end in the league.

During the season-opener against the Seattle Seahawks, Kittle had four receptions for 25 yards and a touchdown before leaving the eventual 17–13 road victory in the third quarter with a hamstring injury. On September 9, he was placed on injured reserve with a torn hamstring. Kittle was activated off injured reserve on October 15. During a Week 8 26–15 road loss to the Houston Texans, Kittle caught four passes for 43 yards and a touchdown. Two weeks later against the Los Angeles Rams, he had nine receptions for 84 yards and a touchdown in the 42–26 loss. In the next game against the Arizona Cardinals, Kittle recorded six receptions for 67 yards and two touchdowns during the 41–22 road victory.

During Week 15 against the Tennessee Titans, Kittle recorded eight receptions for 88 yards and a touchdown in the 37–24 victory. In the next game against the Indianapolis Colts, he had seven receptions for 115 yards and a touchdown before leaving the eventual 48–27 road victory during the third quarter with an ankle injury. The next day, Kittle was named to his seventh Pro Bowl.

Kittle finished the 2025 season with 57 receptions for 628 yards and seven touchdowns in 11 games and starts. The 49ers finished third in the NFC West with a 12–5 record and qualified for the playoffs as the #6-seed. During the Wild Card Round against the Philadelphia Eagles, Kittle left the eventual 23–19 victory in the second quarter after suffering an injury while making a six-yard reception. It was later revealed that he tore his Achilles tendon, ending his season. On January 13, 2026, Kittle was placed on injured reserve. He was ranked 46th by his fellow players on the NFL Top 100 Players of 2026.

=== 2026 season ===
Going into the 2026 season, the 49ers placed Kittle on the Physically Unable to Perform (PUP) list as he recovered from his torn Achilles. On August 23, Kittle was activated from the PUP list.

Kittle returned from injury during the season-opener against the Rams on Thursday Night Football and finished the 27–7 victory in Australia with two receptions for 12 yards. In the next game against the Dolphins, he caught four passes for 80 yards and a touchdown during the 35–13 victory. The following week against the Cardinals, Kittle recorded six receptions for 82 yards and two touchdowns in the 36–30 victory.

During a 24–14 victory over the Broncos, Kittle had four receptions for 70 yards and a 56-yard touchdown.

== Career statistics ==
Legend
**Bold**	Career high

=== NFL ===
==== Regular season ====
Year	Team	Games		Receiving					Rushing					Fumbles	
Year	Team	GP	GS	Rec	Yds	Avg	Lng	TD	Att	Yds	Avg	Lng	TD	Fum	Lost
2017	SF	15	7	43	515	12.0	44	2	0	0	0.0	0	0	0	0
2018	SF	16	16	**88**	**1,377**	15.6	**85T**	5	1	10	**10.0**	10	0	0	0
2019	SF	14	14	85	1,053	12.4	61T	5	**5**	**22**	4.4	**18**	0	1	0
2020	SF	8	8	48	634	13.2	44T	2	2	17	8.5	9	0	0	0
2021	SF	14	14	71	910	12.8	48T	6	3	20	6.7	9	0	**2**	**1**
2022	SF	15	15	60	765	12.8	54T	**11**	0	0	0.0	0	0	1	**1**
2023	SF	16	16	65	1,020	**15.7**	66T	6	1	2	2.0	2	0	0	0
2024	SF	15	15	78	1,106	14.2	43	8	0	0	0.0	0	0	0	0
2025	SF	11	11	57	628	11.0	33	7	1	-3	-3.0	-3	0	0	0
2026	SF	9	9	44	557	12.7	56T	5	0	0	0.0	0	0	1	1
Career		133	125	639	8,565	13.4	85T	57	13	68	5.2	18	0	5	3

==== Postseason ====
Year	Team	Games		Receiving					Rushing					Fumbles	
Year	Team	GP	GS	Rec	Yds	Avg	Lng	TD	Att	Yds	Avg	Lng	TD	Fum	Lost
2019	SF	3	3	8	71	8.9	19	0	0	0	0.0	0	0	0	0
2021	SF	3	3	7	108	15.4	24	**1**	0	0	0.0	0	0	0	0
2022	SF	3	3	**10**	**164**	**16.4**	31	0	**1**	**4**	**4.0**	**4**	0	0	0
2023	SF	3	3	8	112	14.0	**32T**	**1**	0	0	0.0	0	0	0	0
2025	SF	1	1	1	6	6.0	6	0	0	0	0.0	0	0	0	0
Career		13	13	34	461	13.6	32T	2	1	4	4.0	4	0	0	0

=== College ===
Season	Team	GP	Receiving			
Season	Team	GP	Rec	Yds	Avg	TD
2012	Iowa	0	Redshirt			
2013	Iowa	3	5	108	21.6	0
2014	Iowa	3	1	25	**25.0**	0
2015	Iowa	10	20	290	14.5	**6**
2016	Iowa	9	**22**	**314**	14.3	4
Career		25	48	737	15.4	10

== Career highlights ==
=== Awards and honors ===
- 2× First-team All-Pro (2019, 2023)
- 3× Second-team All-Pro (2018, 2022, 2024)
- 7× Pro Bowl (2018, 2019, 2021–2025)
- Yards after catch leader: (2018)
- Salute to Service award (2024)
- Ranked No. 29 in the Top 100 Players of 2019
- Ranked No. 7 in the Top 100 Players of 2020
- Ranked No. 50 in the Top 100 Players of 2021
- Ranked No. 22 in the Top 100 Players of 2022
- Ranked No. 19 in the Top 100 Players of 2023
- Ranked No. 14 in the Top 100 Players of 2024
- Ranked No. 31 in the Top 100 Players of 2025
- Ranked No. 46 in the Top 100 Players of 2026

=== Records ===
==== NFL records ====
Regular season

- Most receiving yards in a half by a tight end: 210
- First tight end to lead the league in yards after catch: 870
- Most receiving yards in first three seasons by a tight end: 2,945
- First tight end to achieve at least 150 receiving yards and one touchdown in two consecutive games

==== 49ers franchise records ====
- Most receiving yards in a season by a tight end: 1,377
- Most receiving yards in a game by a tight end: 210
- Most receptions in a season by a tight end: 88
- First tight end to surpass 1,000 receiving yards
- Fastest time to achieve 400 career receptions: 84 games (September 17, 2023, vs Los Angeles Rams)
- Most career total Pro Bowl selections by a tight end: 7
- Most seasons with 1,000+ receiving yards by a tight end: 4

== Personal life ==
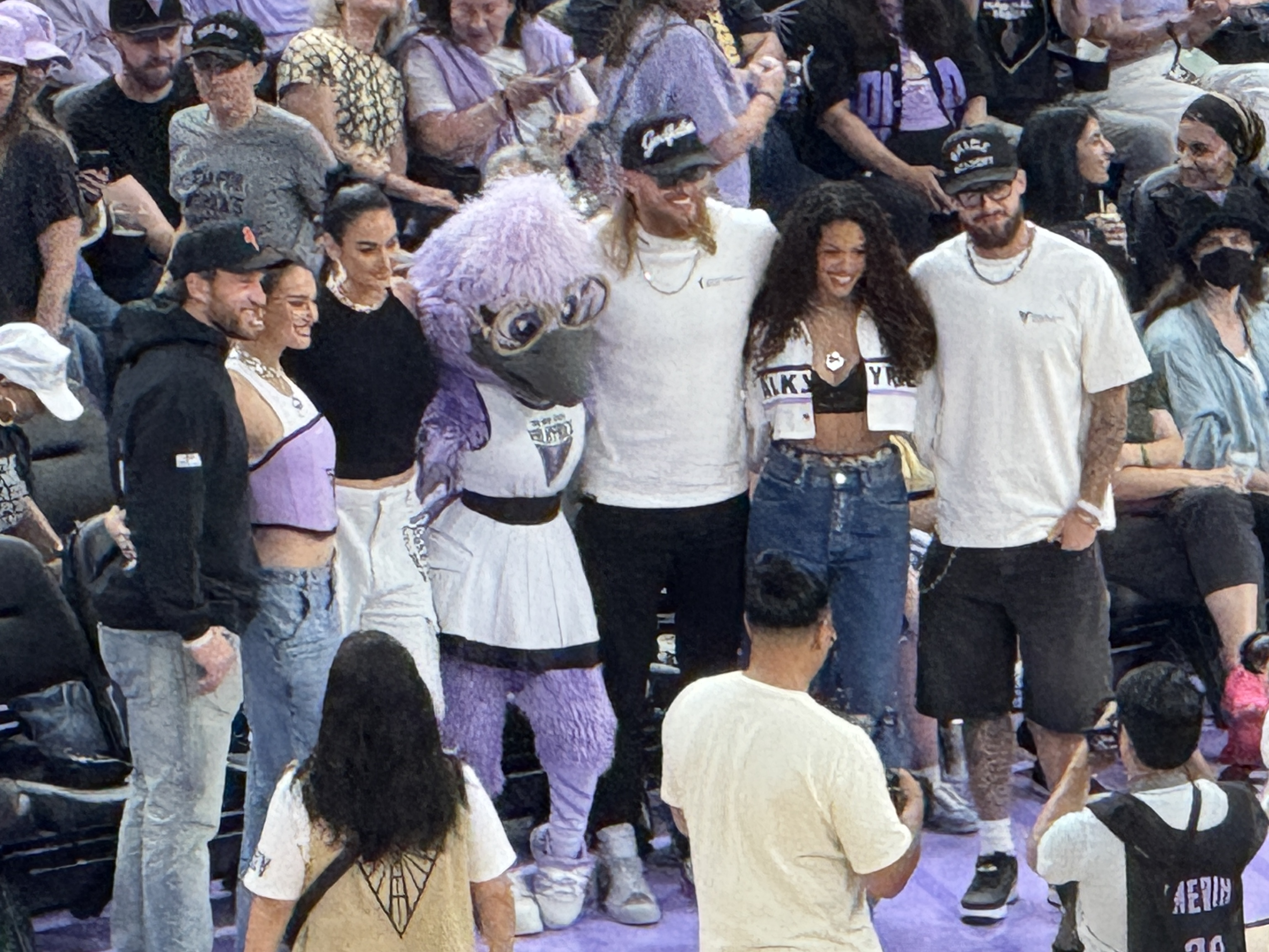
(L-R) Kyle Juszczyk, Kristin Juszczyk, Claire Kittle, Violet (Valkyries mascot), George Kittle, Tori Moraga, and Ricky Pearsall at the Indiana Fever vs. Golden State Valkyries game at Chase Center in San Francisco, Calif. on August 31, 2025.

Kittle married Claire Till on April 9, 2019. They met at the University of Iowa, where Claire played basketball. Kittle has stated that he has been an avid Chicago Bears fan since childhood. Kittle's older sister Emma is married to Cody Ponce.

Kittle is a fan of professional wrestling, having cited Penta as his favorite wrestler, and uses his signature taunt when he gets a first down. When the 49ers played in Mexico City in 2022, Kittle was given a 49ers themed lucha mask from Penta.

== Other ventures ==
He has appeared in multiple television commercials including the NFL, Little Caesars, Old Spice, Zenni Optical, Ritz Crackers, the Real Heroes Project.
