= High School of Fashion Industries =

Fashion school in New York City

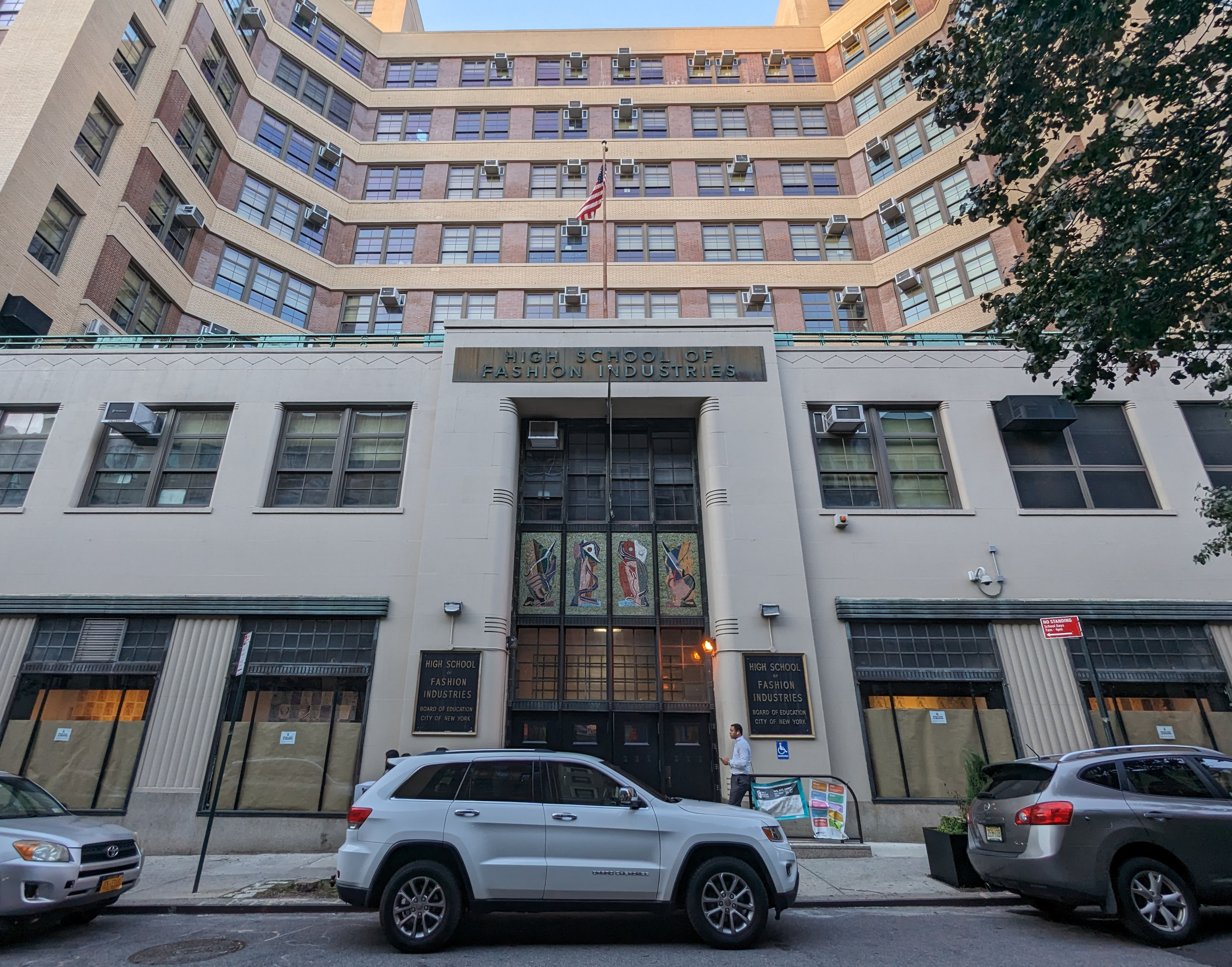

Location
- 225 West 24th Street; New York City, New York 10011; 40°44′43″N 73°59′47″W

Information
- Founded: 1926
- School board: New York City Department of Education
- School number: M600
- Principal: Daryl Blank
- Grades: 9-12
- Enrollment: 1,743 (2004–2005 school year)
- Language: English
- Colors: Blue and yellow
- Mascot: Mikey The Falcon
- Team name: Falcons
- Website: https://www.hsfi.nyc/

High School of Fashion Industries (HSFI) is a secondary school located in Manhattan, New York City, New York. HSFI serves grades 9 through 12 and is a part of the New York City Department of Education. HSFI has magnet programs related to fashion design, fashion art, marketing and visual merchandising, graphics and illustration and photography.

== Admissions ==
Admission to HSFI is highly selective. Students must complete an application to the Board of Education, take the school's exam that includes an art aptitude test, and submit a portfolio. Students are not expected to have formal training in the arts, and many students apply who have little drawing abilities. For prospective students, the school offers pamphlets in most junior high schools and several open house events during the year that include a mock school day with two 45-minute classes.

== Student body ==
The school had a total of 1,743 students during the 2004–2005 school year.

- 56% were Hispanic
- 39% were African-American
- 15% were White
- 4% were Asian
- Less than 1% were Native Americans
- In the 2017–18 school year, it may be more accurate to say 55% Hispanic, 40% African American, 2% White, and 3% Asian.

== Athletics ==
The High School of Fashion Industries is the home of the Falcons:

- Basketball Girls Varsity
- Basketball Boys Varsity
- Bowling Boys Varsity
- Bowling Girls Varsity
- Indoor Track Girls Varsity
- Outdoor Track Girls Varsity
- Softball Girls Varsity
- Volleyball Girls Varsity
- Volleyball Boys Varsity
- Girls Wrestling
- Co-Ed Stunts Varsity
- Girls Swim Varsity

== History ==
Founded in 1926. In March, 1926, Mr Mortimer C. Ritter, with Miss Jessie R. Dutton and Mr. Federick G. Bruck came to the third floor loft of the Greeley Arcade Building and with two classes, one in dressmaking and the other in garment cutting, organized what was to develop into the Central Needle Trades High School.

The school building was completed in 1941 as the Central High School of Needle Trades.

Henryk Gold and his Orchestra played a concert in the Auditorium in 1953.

== Auditorium murals ==
These murals were painted between 1939 and 1940 by Ernest Fiene. and have landmark status. Construction of the murals (and the school building) were part of the US federal government's Works Progress Administration (WPA) program. The murals "[portray] in dramatic and moving fashion the long generation of hope and despair, and the high standard of social and industrial accomplishment in the needle trades."

== Notable alumni ==
- Antonio Fargas, actor, comedian
- Jon Haggins, fashion designer
- Frank Hewitt, jazz pianist
- Hank Whitney, professional basketball player
- Kerby Jean-Raymond, fashion designer
- Darien Sills-Evans, actor, comedian, filmmaker, writer
