= David Lazarus =

American journalist

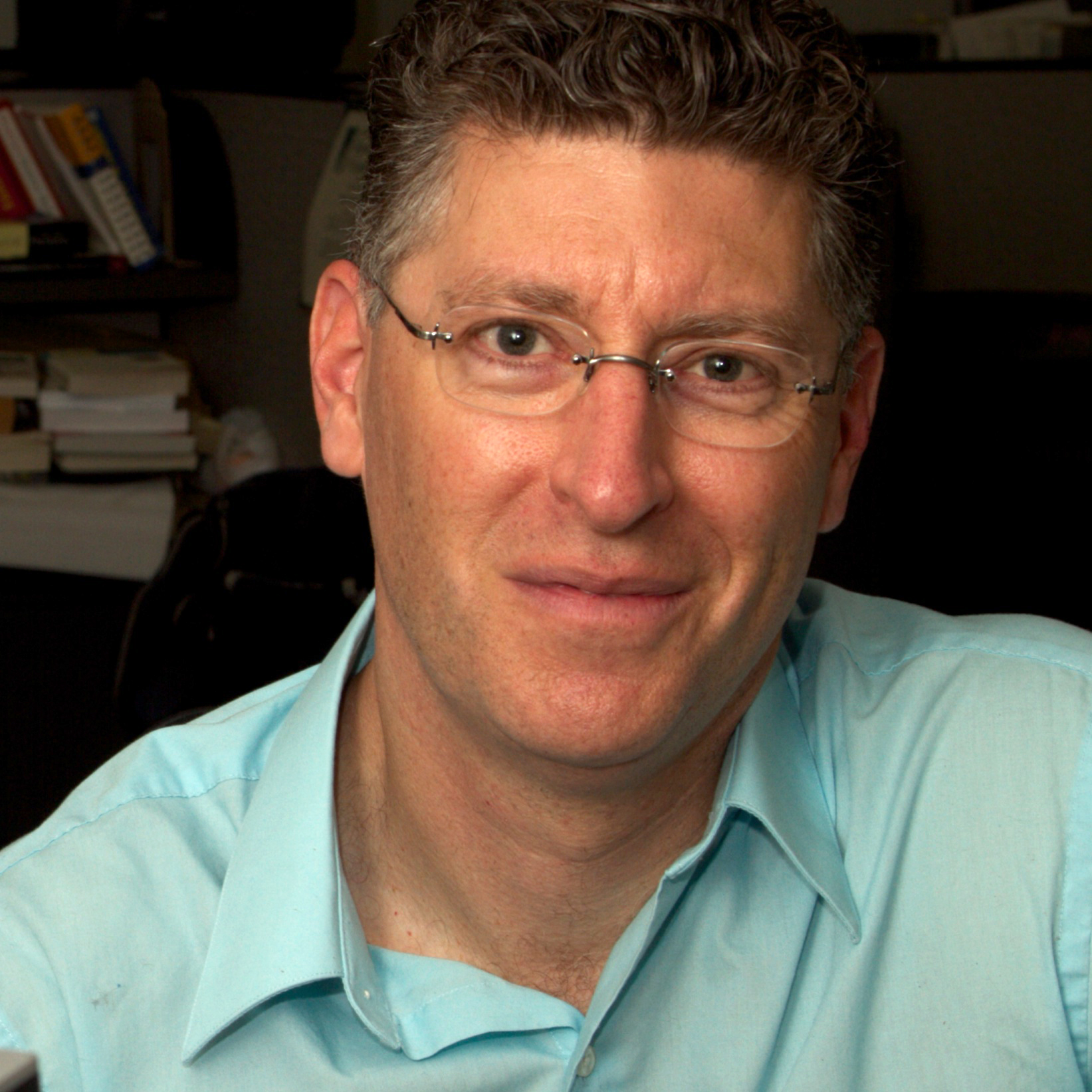
- Occupations: newspaper columnist and reporter
- Employer: KTLA
- Known for: "Consumer Affairs" business column
- Political party: Democratic

David Lazarus is an American business and consumer columnist who works for KTLA and worked for the Los Angeles Times from August 2007 to January 2022. His last column was published on January 28, 2022.

== Early life and education ==
He attended Ojai Valley School and Crossroads School (Santa Monica, California) before heading north to attend and graduate from the University of California, Berkeley, where he earned a degree in history.

== Writing ==
David Lazarus has written pieces for Los Angeles Times about consumer affairs and business topics including YouTube, AT&T and BMW-customer service issues.

Before joining the LA Times staff in 2007, Lazarus worked as a columnist for the San Francisco Chronicle and a nightly talk radio host for San Francisco's KGO Radio. Lazarus also worked for The San Francisco Examiner,The Bangkok Post, and The Japan Times.

He won first place in the 2005 National Headliner Awards contest for business reporting. And the Society of Professional Journalists in Northern California named him "Journalist of the Year" in 2001. A media watchdog site, Grade the News, described him this way: "Since coming to the Chronicle from Wired News in 1999, David Lazarus has been one of the most prolific, and influential, writers at the paper." He is known for sticking up and helping ordinary people deal with problems "such as fighting telemarketers".

Lazarus is the author of two books on Japan, where he lived for several years, and has had articles published in many magazines.

== Radio interviews ==
Lazarus has often been interviewed about data breach issues (see Anthem medical data breach) and privacy matters on talk radio shows such as the Norman Goldman Show. He is also regularly seen on KTLA “Consumer Confidential” segments.

== Personal ==
Lazarus lives in Southern California with his wife and son. Lazarus is a member of the Democratic Party. He is Jewish.
