= Peter DiPilato =

American photographer

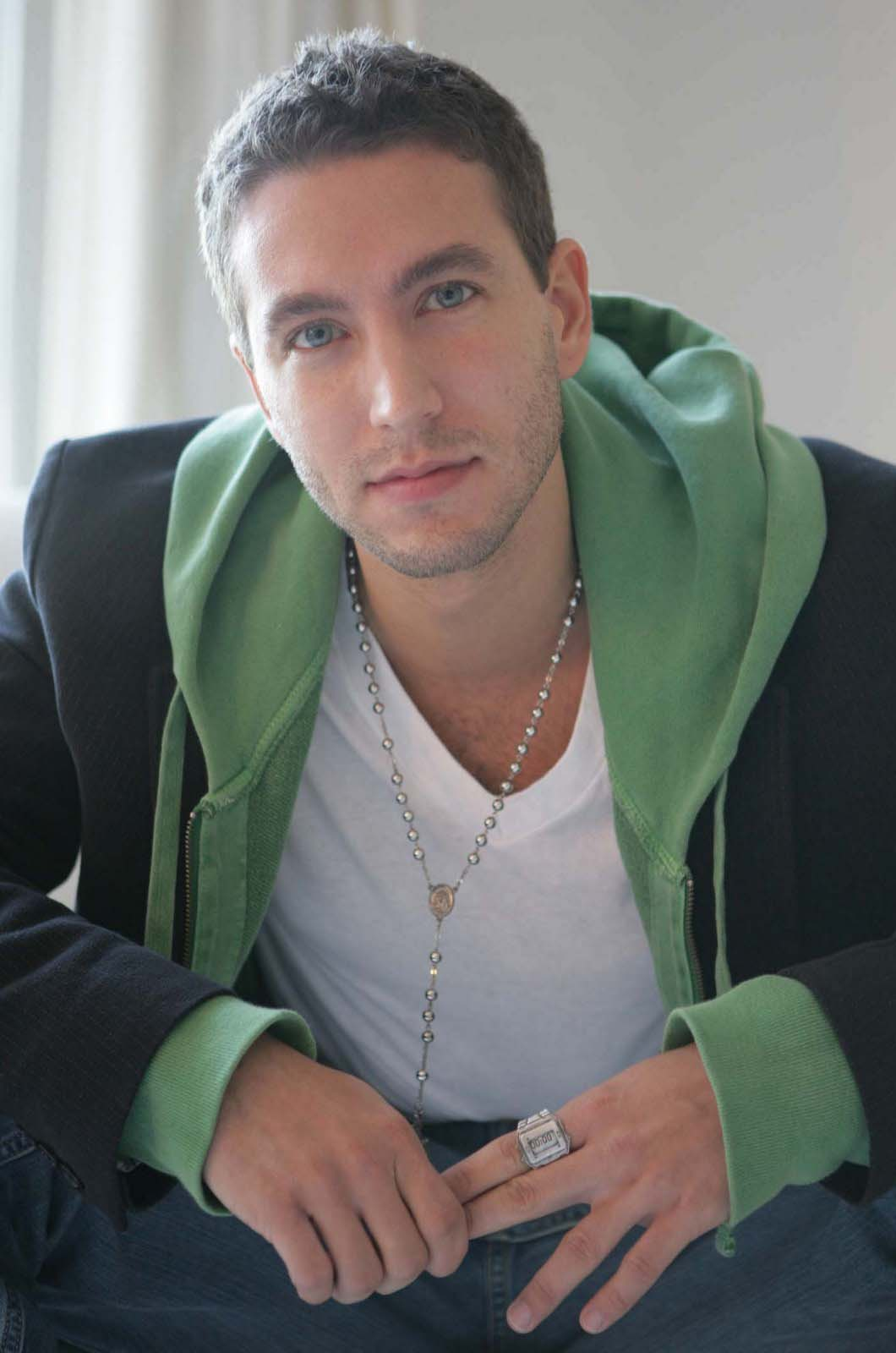
- DiPilato in 2007
- Born: June 14, 1976 (age 50); Brooklyn, New York, U.S.
- Education: Xavier High School; Fashion Institute of Technology
- Occupation: Photographer
- Website: www.peterjoe.com

Peter DiPilato (born June 14, 1976) is an American entertainment photographer. He is best known for his riveting footage on 9/11 which was featured in the documentary film 7 Days in September, directed by Steven Rosenbaum. He also appeared on the first season of the reality show Shipmates.

== Education ==
He attended Xavier High School in Manhattan and earned a B.S. in Advertising and Marketing Communications at the Fashion Institute of Technology.

== Awards ==
DiPilato was the Grand Prize winner for the Oakland Raiders in the 2013 NFL Back to Football Photo Day Contest sponsored by New Era Cap Company.

== Filmography ==
Film
| Year | Production | Role | Notes |
|---|---|---|---|
| 2002 | 7 Days in September | Cinematographer | Cameo |
Television
| Year | Production | Role | Notes |
| 2001 | Shipmates | Himself | 1 Episode |
