= Cailli and Sam Beckerman =

Canadian identical twin influencers

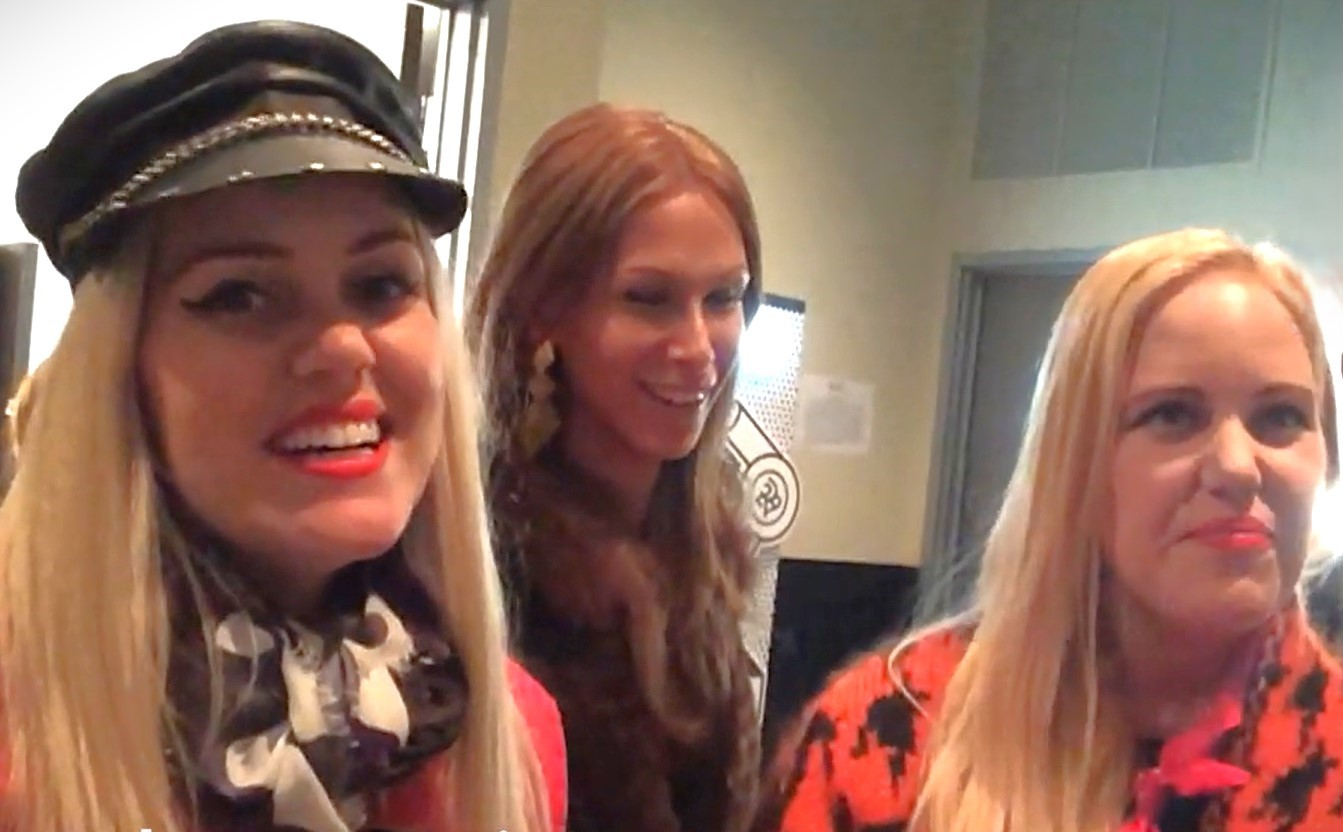
- Beckerman sisters interviewed at New York Fashion Week 2014
- Born: Caillianne Beckerman; Samantha Beckerman; Toronto, Ontario, Canada
- Occupation: Fashion bloggers
- Years active: 2004–present

Caillianne Beckerman and Samantha Beckerman (born 1980), also known as the Beckerman sisters or Beckerman twins, are Canadian, identical twin fashion bloggers and two of the top social influencers in Canada, according to Cision. They are known for their appearances and blogging from New York Fashion Week.

== Life ==
The Beckermans graduated from the Fashion Institute of Technology in 2004. They lived in New York City for 10 years before returning to Toronto in 2009. With the help of their sister, Chloe, a textile designer, they launched a clothing line, Beckerman, that was picked up by Holt Renfrew but faltered because of the recession. They returned to Toronto in February 2009 and launched their fashion blog the following month.

Fashion designer Jeremy Scott described their style as "intergalactic"; they're known for wearing, "clashing, cartoonish, multilayered outfits".

They buy clothes from flea markets, eBay and YOOX and are proponents of contemporary designers such as Proenza Schouler and Christopher Kane.

== Career ==
Their work revolves around hosting parties in Miami, New York City and Los Angeles, photo shoots and covering fashion weeks. They also partner with companies such as Chanel, Coach, Inc. and Apple Inc.

In 2013, they were the official H&M bloggers for the Much Music Video Awards in Toronto.

In 2015, their dogs were named two of the most chic pets on instagram by Harpers Bazaar.

In 2016, they were included on The Globe and Mail list of top digital style moments of that year. Also in 2016, they were listed on The Huffington Post's list of, "20 Canadian Instagrammers You Need To Follow,"; they have over 160,000 followers.

In 2017, the Beckermans were awarded The Digital Fashion Influencer of the Year Award by CAFA.

== See also ==
- List of twins
