= Kate Spade & Company =

American fashion company

- Type: Subsidiary
- Industry: Fashion
- Founded: New York, New York (1976)
- Headquarters: New York, New York, United States
- Key people: Anna Bakst (CEO); George M. Carrara (COO); Deborah Lloyd (CCO)
- Products: Clothing; Accessories; Perfumes
- Revenue: ▲1,242.72 million USD (2015)
- Net income: ▼17.09 million (2015)
- Number of employees: 6,800 (2014)
- Parent: Tapestry, Inc.

Kate Spade & Company, initially known as Liz Claiborne Inc. (founded in 1976 in Manhattan), and then as Fifth & Pacific Companies, Inc. (from 2012 to 2014), is a fashion company that designs and markets a range of women's and men's apparel, accessories and fragrance products under the Kate Spade New York and Jack Spade labels. The company is owned by Tapestry, Inc.

== History ==
Liz Claiborne Inc. was founded in 1976 by Liz Claiborne, Art Ortenberg, Leonard Boxer, and Jerome Chazen. In 1980, Nina McLemore founded Liz Claiborne Accessories. Liz Claiborne Inc. went public in 1981 and made the Fortune 500 list in 1986, ten years after it was founded, with retail sales of $1.2 billion. After retiring in 1989, Claiborne died on June 26, 2007, at the age of 78 from complications from cancer. Robert Abajian succeeded her as head of design for the company, remaining in that role until his retirement in 1994.

On May 15, 2012, Liz Claiborne Inc. officially became Fifth & Pacific Companies, Inc. and shifted focus to three brands – Juicy Couture, Kate Spade New York, and Lucky Brand Jeans. On October 7, 2013, Fifth & Pacific Companies announced that they would sell Juicy Couture to Authentic Brands Group for $195 million. In December 2013, the company announced that it was selling Lucky Brand Jeans for $225 million to Leonard Green & Partners, leaving the Kate Spade businesses as the company's sole label.

On February 25, 2014, Fifth & Pacific Companies was renamed as Kate Spade & Company. Craig A. Leavitt succeeded William McComb as CEO, whose retirement marked the official end of the company's transformation from Liz Claiborne to Kate Spade.

== Business growth and consolidation ==
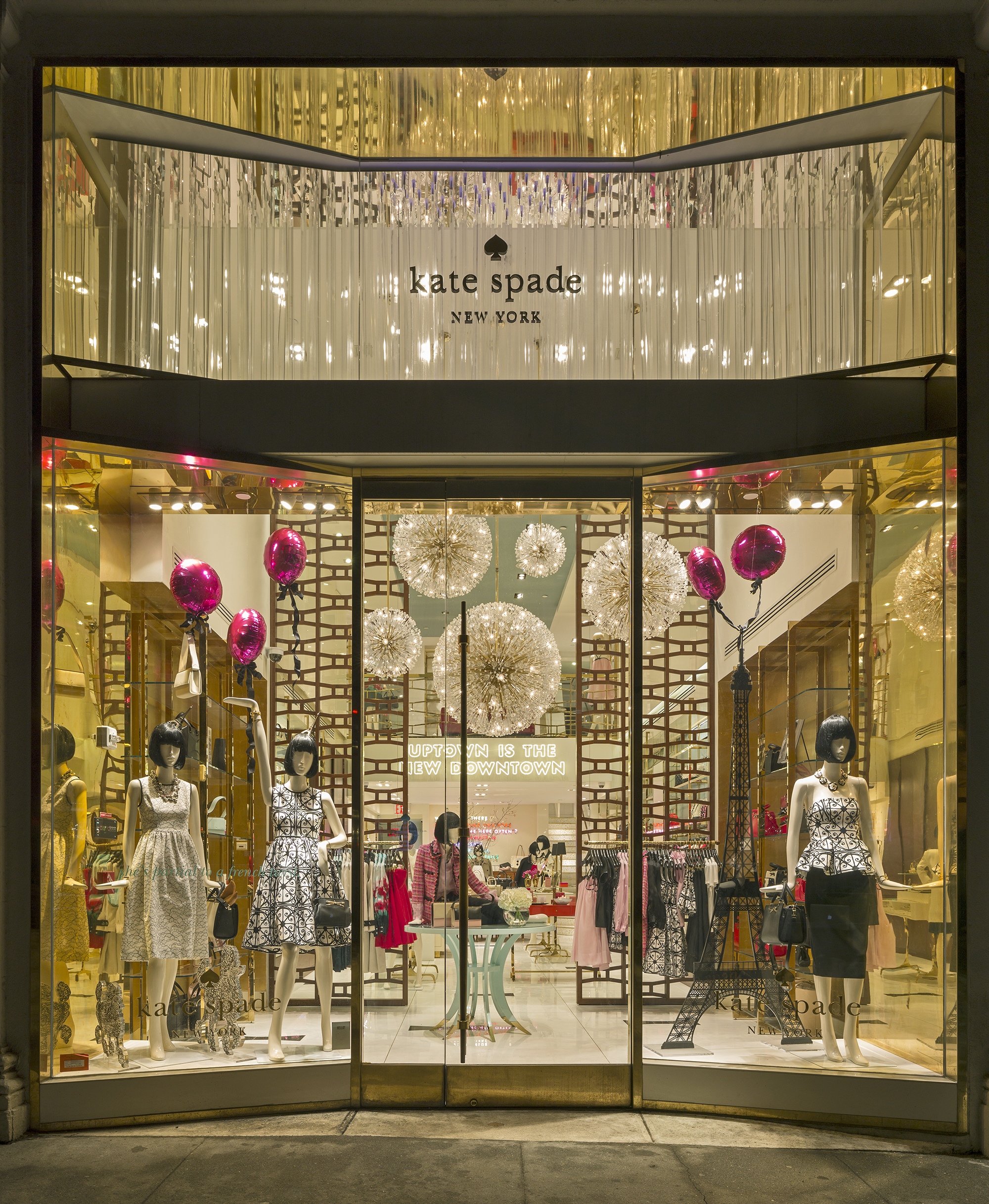
Kate Spade New York – Madison Avenue store

Founder Leonard Boxer retired in 1985, and in 1989, Liz Claiborne and Art Ortenberg also retired from active management. Jerome Chazen became the company's Chairman in 1989 and held that role until 1996, when Paul Charron, a former CPG Executive, became chairman and CEO and held that position until his retirement in 2006. During Charron's tenure, Liz Claiborne Inc. acquired Lucky Brand Jeans in 1999. In 2001, they acquired Mexx and in 2003, they bought another small fashion company, Juicy Couture. The company acquired Kate Spade New York in 2006. Under Paul Charron's leadership, the company sustained its greatest notoriety since the earliest days of Liz Claiborne and her iconic women's pant suits. Engaging in a series of well-timed strategic acquisitions, the portfolio amassed nearly 40 brands and achieved over $5B in global annual revenue, including an unprecedented streak of quarterly positive growth. Upon Charron's retirement in October, 2006, Liz Claiborne Inc. named William McComb, a Johnson & Johnson veteran, as the company's Chief Executive Officer. That appointment was the beginning of a downward trend for the company, exacerbated by the 2008–2009 recession.

On October 8, 2009, JC Penney Co. (based out of Plano, Texas) announced that it would become the exclusive retailer for the Liz Claiborne brand. All Liz Claiborne merchandise would exit any additional department-store retailer, and the Liz Claiborne New York label (designed by Isaac Mizrahi) would move from department stores to QVC. The Liz&Co. and Concepts by Claiborne brands originally exclusively sold at JC Penney would be phased out, and the Liz Claiborne merchandise would begin appearing in JC Penney stores in August 2010.

In October 2011, the company completed the sale of its Dana Buchman brand to Kohl's. In November 2011, the company announced that it completed the transaction to sell domestic and international trademark rights of its Liz Claiborne family of brands and domestic trademark rights of its Monet brand to JC Penney. In 2013, Fifth & Pacific narrowed its focus to the Kate Spade brand by selling both Juicy Couture and Lucky Brand Jeans, returning to a mono-brand company.

== Acquisition ==
In 2017, Coach Inc., now known as Tapestry, Inc., acquired Kate Spade & Company for $2.4 billion. The deal was finalized in July 2017, making Kate Spade a wholly owned subsidiary of Coach. This acquisition aimed to strengthen Coach's position in the global luxury market and expand its reach to younger consumers, particularly millennials, who were a key demographic for Kate Spade.

== Leadership ==
Deborah Lloyd, formerly of Banana Republic and Burberry, joined Kate Spade New York in 2007 and leads the creative aspects of the brand as president and chief creative officer. In this role, she oversees all creative aspects, including product design, merchandising and creative services. She retired in 2018. Nichola Glass took over her role and just debuted her first collection with the brand.

Craig A. Leavitt joined the company shortly thereafter and was the chief executive officer from February 2014 until August 2017, after the acquisition of the company by Coach (now named Tapestry). On March 23, 2018, Anna Bakst, former president of the accessories and footwear categories at Michael Kors, was appointed CEO of the company and reports directly to Victor Luis, Tapestry's CEO. Bakst served as CEO for less than two years before announcing she would leave at the end of 2019.

== Brands ==
The Kate Spade & Company portfolio of brands included Kate Spade New York and Jack Spade. The Adelington Design Group, a private-label jewelry design and development group, was also operated by the company.
