= Jon Haggins =

American fashion designer (1943–2023)

John Wesley Haggins Jr. (September 5, 1943 – June 15, 2023) was an American fashion designer, cabaret performer, and travel journalist. He was one of the first major black designers in the United States.

== Early life and education ==
John Wesley Hagins Jr. was born in Tampa, Florida, on September 5, 1943. When his father enlisted in the Army during World War II, his last name was misspelled with an extra "g." His mother, Willie Mae Hagins (née Walker), altered the family name to reflect this, fearing that she and her son would not be eligible for veterans' benefits if something happened to her husband. The "h" would be removed from Haggins' first name sometime in the 1960s.

His parents separated when John Sr. returned from the war. His mother left Florida to seek better job opportunities in New York, and Haggins was raised in Sanford, Florida, by his grandfather, a carpenter, until he was ten years old. In 1953, Haggins joined his mother in New York, along with his sister, Carolyn, who had been living in a foster home. The family relocated to Coney Island in Brooklyn, New York. Haggins had a passion for fashion and drawing. He attended the High School of Fashion Industries in Manhattan. Following graduation, he went to the nearby Fashion Institute of Technology, and he received his degree in 1964.

== Career ==
In his first two years after graduating from college, he had several jobs, initially as a pattern maker and later at a blouse manufacturer. According to his memoir Just Being Jon, "Blacks were the largely invisible members of the back-room staff in fashion houses during the 1960s," and he was not the kind to work in the back room.

Haggins started going a nightclub called Arthur on East 54th Street in Manhattan, which was owned by actress Sybil Burton. He began making a collection by dressing his school friend, Myrna Stephens, in his own creations. He made a new dress every night they went out. By 1966, he had 12 pieces, and he made cold calls to editors at fashion magazines, including Women's Wear Daily, the first magazine to feature him. Haggins recalled that the editor who visited him informed her colleagues that she had recently found "a tall, ebony young man with the most inspirational fashions."

Frequently using geometric designs and mostly devoid of buttons or zippers, Haggins created slinky, matte jersey and chiffon pieces with plunging necklines and backs. When the model Petra appeared on the cover of the August 1970 issue of Cosmopolitan wearing one of his backless white bathing suits, it created a stir because of its "derrière décolletage," as Haggins described it.

He soon had debts, including overdue taxes. In 1972, he shut down his business because the bank would not provide him more credit. He was employed by Leslie Fay and other businesses throughout the 1970s and 1980s. Additionally, he would shut down his business after various successful relaunches.

Furthermore, Higgins worked as a journalist, a cabaret singer, an actor in a soap opera, a television pitchman, a travel advisor, and, lastly, the host of GlobeTrotter TV, a travel program on New York's public-access cable television.

== Personal life ==
Haggins's romantic partners were primarily men, but he married model June Murphy after they met in 1970. The marriage dissolved after a year and a half. Haggins admitted that he had been "chronically unfaithful," and the divorce was acrimonious.

== Death ==
Haggins died at the age of 79 at his home in Queens, New York, on June 15, 2023. He is survived by his sister, Carolyn Grant.
