= Reviewed (website) =

American product review site

- Website type: Product reviews
- Founded: 1997
- Headquarters: Cambridge, Massachusetts
- Owner: Gannett
- Key people: Chris Lloyd (general manager); David Kender (editor in chief)
- Website: reviewed.usatoday.com

Reviewed is a consumer product review website based in Cambridge, Massachusetts and emphasizes a science-based approach that tests consumer products in both everyday and lab environments. As of 2021, Reviewed has over 70 employees and over 40 staff members dedicated to testing products. The site is owned by Gannett and part of the USA Today Network. Revenue is generated through a blend of affiliate commissions, licensing, and advertising. Dave Kender is the current Editor in Chief.

== Testing ==
Reviewed has a 24,000 square-foot testing lab in its Cambridge headquarters where reporters and scientists on staff can test the latest appliances, televisions, headphones, and other consumer products against standard benchmarks to judge overall quality. The chief scientist designs rigorous tests for products like dishwashers and water purifiers that, in some cases, can takes months to complete.

== Content ==
The site's Best Right Now articles are Reviewed's flagship content type, which typically have two products named as Editors’ Choice recommendations. Other pieces of content they produce include single-product reviews, how-to articles, gift guides, and deals content.

== History ==
Reviewed was originally a network of sites founded by Robin Liss in 1997 including DigitalCameraInfo.com, TelevisionInfo.com, and CamcorderInfo.com. Gannett acquired the network in 2011. As of 2019, Reviewed is part of USA TODAY Network's Content Ventures group.

In December 2022, editorial staff at the website launched a campaign to unionize about 60 employees. The union vote a few months later was successful. In October 2023, more than 40 unionized staff participated in a one-day strike after Gannett failed to agree to contract bargaining dates. A few weeks later the union accused Gannett of publishing articles to the site written with generative AI. In August 2024, Gannett announced it will shut down Reviewed. Instead, Gannett sold the site to StackCommerce, which continued to run it.
