= Robert Abajian =

American fashion designer

Robert Abajian (27 January 1932 — 6 January 1995) was an American fashion designer and fashion industry executive. A graduate of the Fashion Institute of Technology, he won the Mortimer Ritter Award for design in 1978. He was design director for 11 years for Bobbie Brooks before joining Liz Claiborne Inc. as design director in 1984. In 1987 he became Vice President of Liz Claiborne Inc. and was in charge of the Lizsport line. He succeeded Liz Claiborne as head of design for the company when she retired in 1989, remaining in that role until his retirement in 1994. He served as president of Fashion's Inner Circle in 1992.
