= Danielle De Jesus =

American visual artist and photographer (b. 1987)

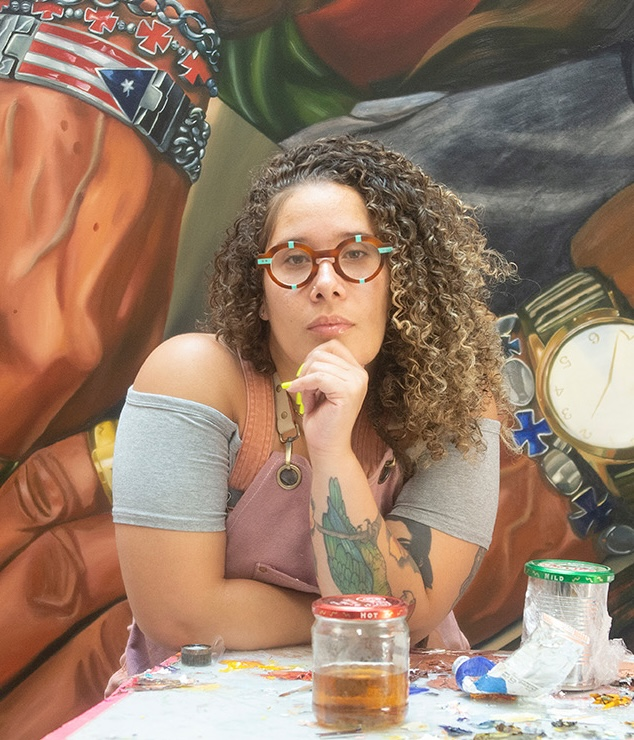
- Danielle De Jesus in her studio
- Born: 1987 (age 38–39); Bushwick, Brooklyn, U.S.
- Education: Yale School of Art; Fashion Institute of Technology
- Known for: Painting on US currency
- Movement: Nuyorican Movement
- Website: danielledejesus.com

Danielle De Jesus is a Nuyorican painter and photographer born and raised in Bushwick, Brooklyn, whose works tell the story of growing up in New York City amidst gentrification and displacement. She draws from her experience growing up in the Puerto Rican diaspora as a native of Bushwick, New York to document her home neighborhood while creating narratives that uplift the lives and stories of the multi diverse residents she grew up with. She works in painting, photography and uses multimedia objects such as dollar bills and common household items such as tablecloths to create texture stories of everyday life and resilience.

De Jesus’s work has been included in the permanent collections of the Perez Art Museum of Miami, the Whitney Museum of American Art and El Museo Del Barrio in New York.

== Early life and education ==
Danielle earned a Bachelor of Fine Arts (BFA) in Photography from the Fashion Institute of Technology and a Master of Fine Arts (MFA) in Painting from Yale University’s School of Art.

== Career ==
De Jesus’ background is in photography and she utilizes her images of the people native to Bushwick as a reference to tell the story of Bushwick’s displaced residents, informed by her personal experiences with gentrification and displacement. Danielle’s images make viewers rethink the significance of the image and the politics of representation involving the largely low-income people of color depicted in her paintings. Her work pushes audiences to think critically about the larger economies of urban America, but also about matters of intimacy and the interior lives of local residents. Ultimately, her works pushes viewers to think about the effects of capitalism, and the urban settler colonial histories impacting Puerto Rican diaspora communities in Brooklyn, Puerto Rico and beyond.

== Exhibitions ==
In 2022, Danielle De Jesus was the inaugural resident at Beecher Residency, established at the Stillman House in Litchfield, Connecticut, designed by 20th-century architect Marcel Breuer with permanent installations from Alexander Calder.

De Jesus was included in prominent group shows such as Reflections on Perception (2022), Akron Art Museum, Ohio; Life Between Buildings (2022) at MoMA PS1, New York; the No existe un mundo poshurácan: Puerto Rican Art in the wake of Hurricane Maria (2022–2023) exhibition and accompanying scholarly catalog at the Whitney Museum of American Art, New York. In 2021-2022, De Jesus participated in a two-person show at Calderón in New York, alongside visual artist Shellyne Rodriguez titled Siempre en la calle.

In 2026, De Jesus's work was featured in This is America: Selections from PAMM's Collection, at the Pérez Art Museum Miami, Florida.

== Museum collections ==
Paintings by Danielle De Jesus are included in the permanent collection of the Pérez Art Museum Miami, Florida; El Museo del Barrio, New York; and the Whitney Museum of American Art, New York.
