= Soho Grand Hotel =

Hotel in Manhattan, New York

Coordinates: 40.722151°N 74.004204°W

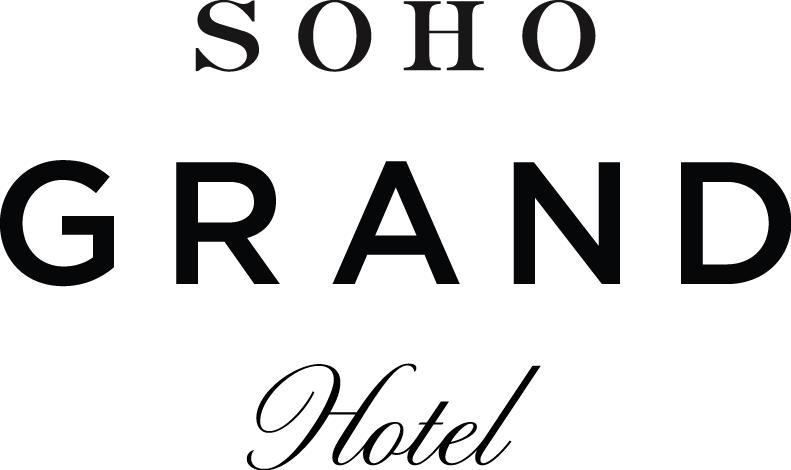

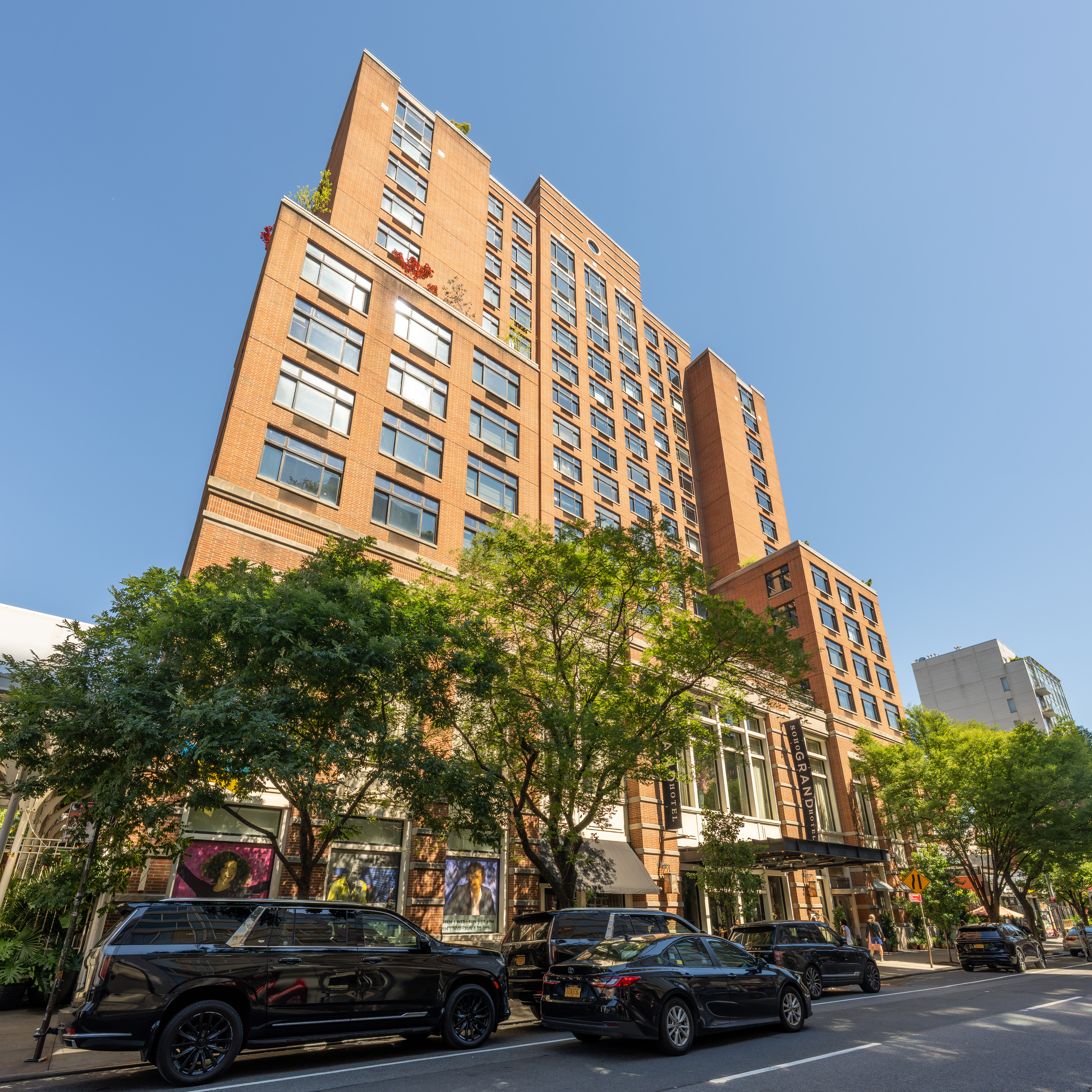
- Interactive map of the Soho Grand Hotel area
- Hotel chain: GrandLife Hotels

General information
- Location: United States, 310 West Broadway; SoHo, Manhattan, New York City
- Opening: August 4, 1996
- Owner: Hartz Mountain Industries

Height
- Height: 50 m (160 ft)

Technical details
- Floor count: 17

Design and construction
- Architects: David Helpern of Helpern Architects; William Sofield of Studio Sofield (interiors)

Other information
- Number of rooms: 347
- Number of suites: 10
- Number of restaurants: 3
- Parking: US$40 daily

Website
- sohogrand.com

The Soho Grand Hotel is a hotel located at 310 West Broadway between Grand and Canal Streets in the SoHo neighborhood of Lower Manhattan, New York City at the former location of Church of St. Alphonsus Liguori. It has 353 guest rooms, including ten suites and two penthouses. With the Roxy Hotel (formerly the Tribeca Grand Hotel), they make up GrandLife Hotels and are owned and operated by Leonard N. Stern of Hartz Mountain Industries.

The Soho Grand Hotel opened on August 4, 1996 news of the build initiated significant opposition from local residents; eight prior attempts to build a hotel there in the preceding decade had failed. It was the first hotel to be built in SoHo during the previous century, and the first luxury boutique hotel in downtown Manhattan.

== Features ==
=== Art gallery ===
The Gallery at Soho Grand opened within the hotel in 1996, and holds original art exhibitions.

=== Restaurants ===
Restaurants onsite are The Club Room, Gilligan's, and Grand Bar and Salon. The Grand Bar and Salon, opened with the hotel in 1996, recalls classic New York bars of a bygone era. The Club Room lounge overlooks West Broadway, and was added in 2010. Gilligan's in a seasonal outdoor venue styled with "yacht-club-meets-tropical-resort" kitsch, an homage to Gilligan's Island. The Soho Diner opened in late 2019. The American 24-hour diner is led by chef Ken Addington.

== Design ==
The Soho Grand was designed by David Helpern of Helpern Architects. The interiors are designed by William Sofield of Studio Sofield. The architecture and design incorporate elements including bottle glass and cast iron molding, both of which are prominent in neighborhood buildings from SoHo industrial history.

Renovations have continued within the hotel since its opening; in 2004, the hotel introduced two penthouse loft suites, winners of the Interior Design Gold Key award.

Soho Grand's guestrooms and Suites' design direction take their cue from the public spaces. In 2010, the hotel unveiled ten suites designed by William Sofield that feature wall coverings designed by New Yorker illustrator, Saul Steinberg.

== In popular culture ==
The Soho Grand has been represented in a variety of feature films, television shows, and online videos including:

- The Oprah Winfrey "Best of" Show
- The Sopranos
- Sex and the City
- Donna Karan viral video starring Christina Ricci
- Made, a film by Jon Favreau.

== Notable events ==
In fall 2013, a hotel employee started several fires because he allegedly wanted to lighten his workload by making the hotel less popular.
