= Gloria Garfinkel =

American visual artist

Gloria Garfinkel (1929 – 2024) was an American visual artist based in New York.

== Work ==
Garfinkel studied Apparel Design at the Fashion Institute of Technology in New York City from 1947 to 1949. She realized she wanted to be an artist while taking a life-drawing class in the basement of FIT, then on West 24th Street.

== Career ==
Garfinkel had developed a daily practice creating paintings, sculptures, and collaged prints showcasing the artist's interest in the fashion and decorative motifs of Japan. She is best known for her brightly colored, highly patterned works that bridge the gap between sculpture and painting.

As Mary Hrbacek said in a 2015 review of Garfinkel's work for Artes Magazine:

Garfinkel’s ability to balance striking elements in an integral visual harmony brings transformation to the borders of imagination, yielding vibrant works whose fundamental truths probe the similarities between Western and Japanese art forms.

In 2021, A.I.R. Gallery mounted the largest New York City solo show of Garfinkel's 70-year career, curated by Mara Williams, chief curator of Vermont's Brattleboro Museum and Art Center.

== Exhibitions and collections ==
Garfinkel had exhibited internationally for more than 30 years, with solo exhibitions at Paul Sharpe Contemporary Art, Associated American Artists, and Bodely Gallery, all in New York; Yellow Bird Gallery, Newburgh, N.Y.; The International Museum of Art & Science, McAllen, Texas; Ulrich Museum, Wichita, Kansas; Artestudio Sumithra, Ravenna, Italy, and Emerson Gallery Museum, Hamilton College, Clinton, N.Y.

Her work is included in the collection of the Worcester Art Museum.
