= Textile printing =

Method for applying patterns to cloth using printing techniques

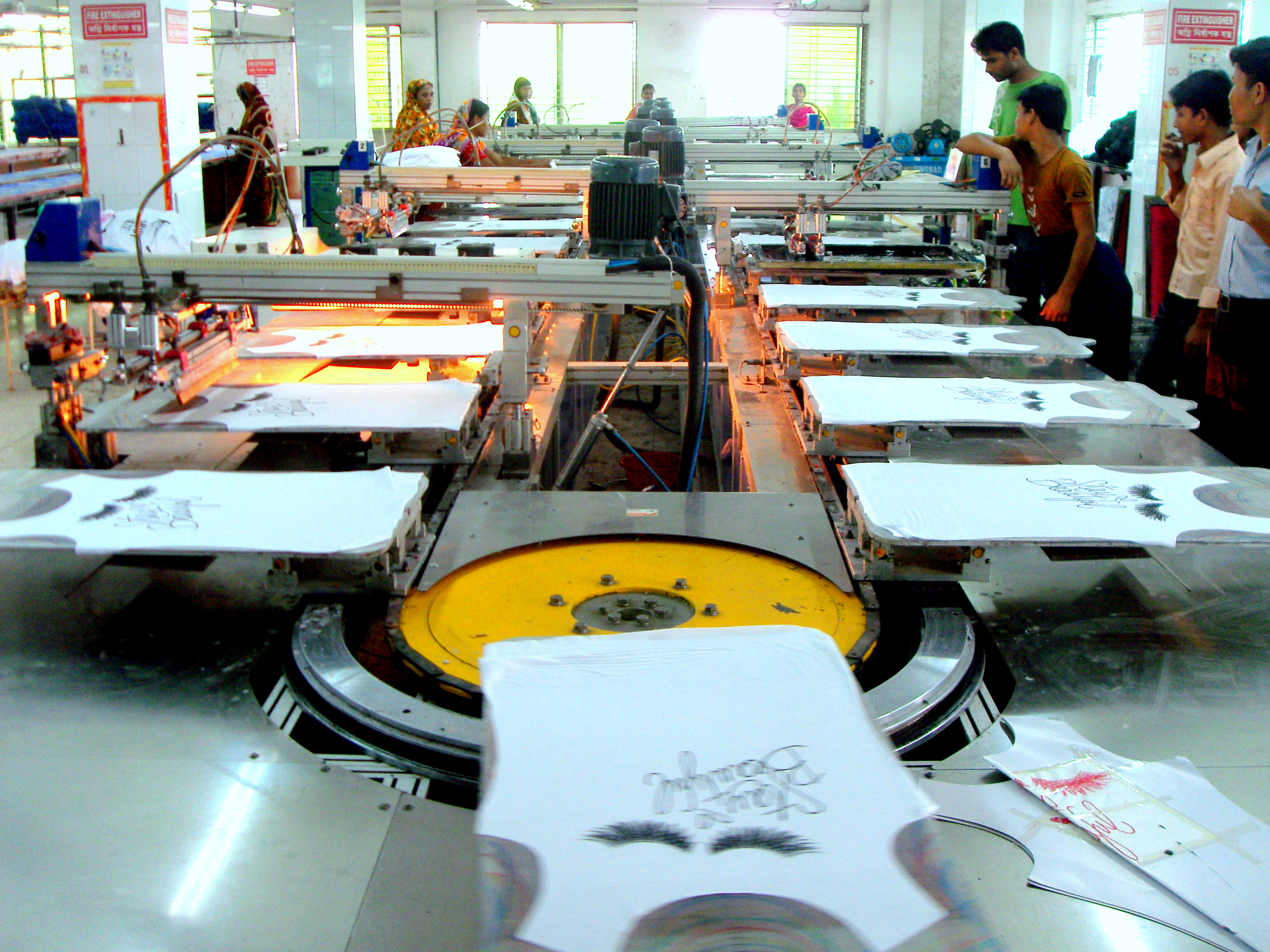
Auto printing machine in a RMG factory of Bangladesh

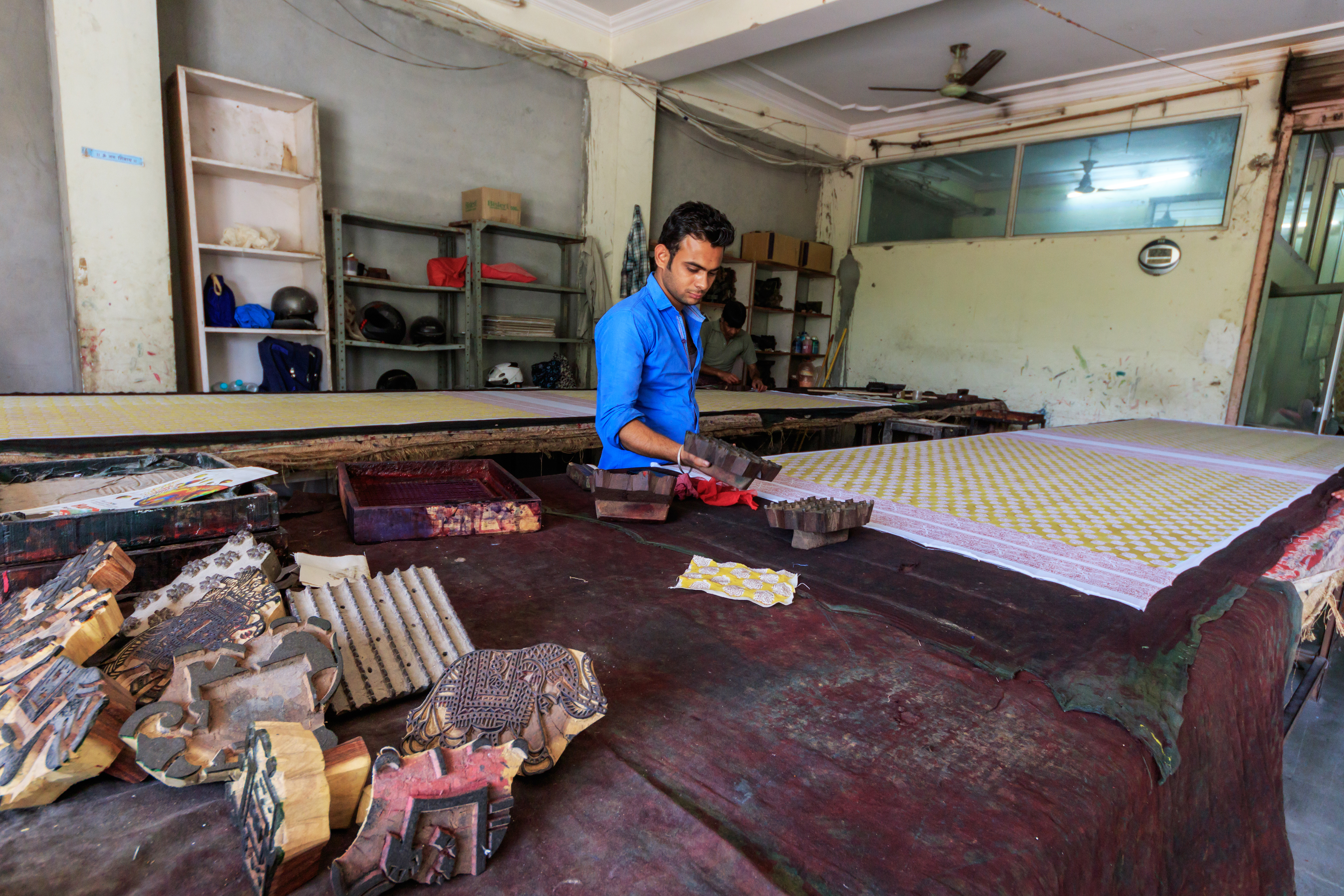
Woodblock printing in Jaipur, Rajasthan, India

Woodblock printing in Bagh, Madhya Pradesh, India

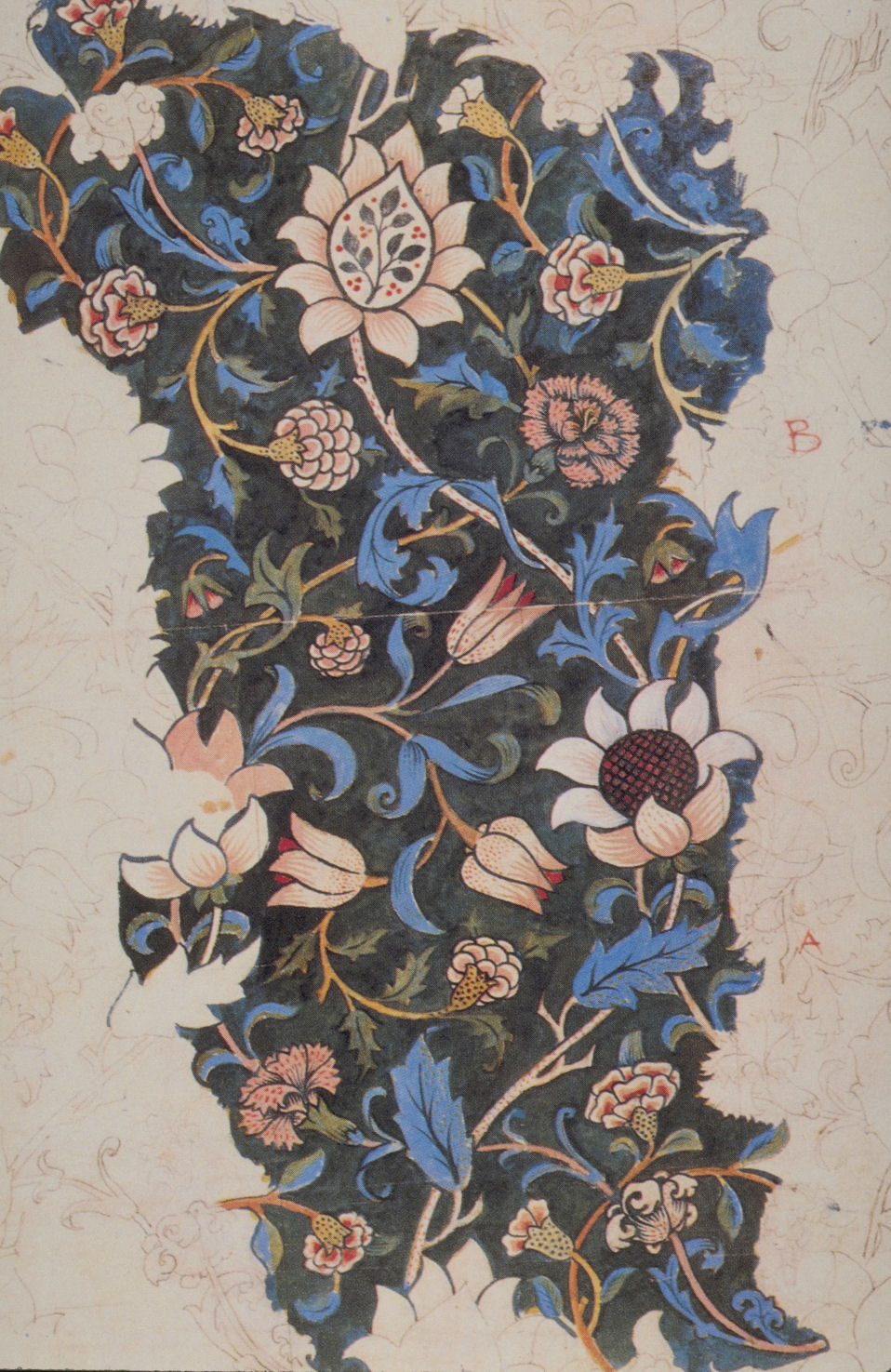
Design for a hand woodblock printed textile, showing the complexity of the blocks used to make repeating patterns. Evenlode by William Morris, 1883.

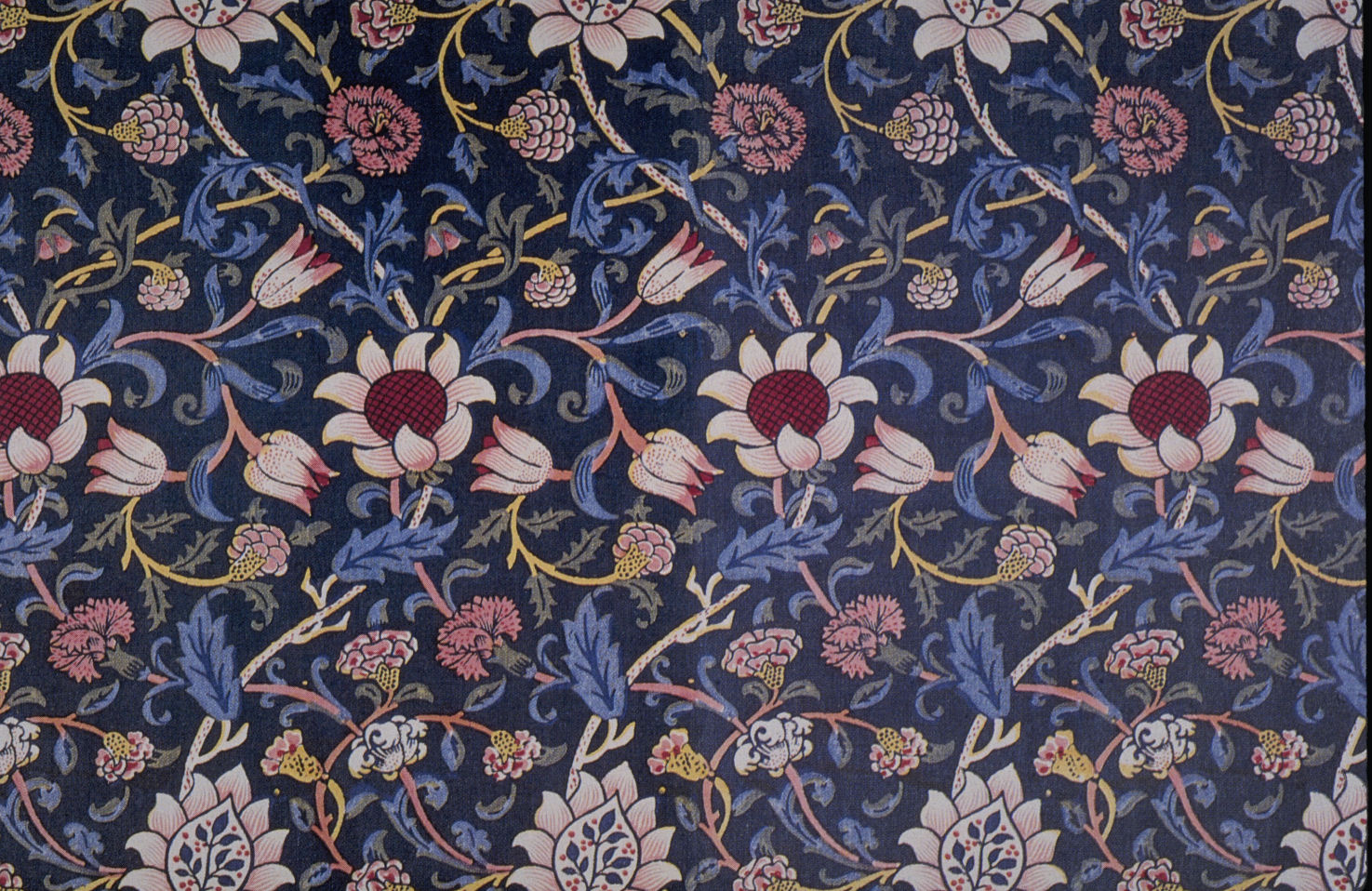
Evenlode block-printed fabric

Textile printing is the process of applying color to fabric in definite patterns or designs. In properly printed fabrics the colour is bonded with the fibre, so as to resist washing and friction. Textile printing is related to dyeing but in dyeing properly the whole fabric is uniformly covered with one colour, whereas in printing one or more colours are applied to it in certain parts only, and in sharply defined patterns.

In printing, wooden blocks, stencils, engraved plates, rollers, or silkscreens can be used to place colours on the fabric. Colourants used in printing contain dyes thickened to prevent the colour from spreading by capillary attraction beyond the limits of a pattern or design.

== History ==
Woodblock printing is a technique for printing text, images or patterns used widely throughout East Asia and probably originating in China in antiquity as a method of printing on textiles and later paper. As a method of printing on cloth, the earliest surviving examples from China date to before 220 CE/AD.

Textile printing was known in Europe, via the Islamic world, from about the 12th century, and was widely used. However, the European dyes tended to liquify, which restricted the use of printed patterns. Fairly large and ambitious designs were printed for decorative purposes such as wall-hangings and lectern-cloths, where this was less of a problem as they did not need washing. When paper became common, the technology was rapidly used on that for woodcut prints. Superior cloth was also imported from Islamic countries, but this was much more expensive.

Woodblock printing has a rich history and has evolved over time. In Japan, it became a highly respected art form called ukiyo-e, creating famous works like Hokusai's "The Great Wave Off Kanagawa" (circa 1830-1832) [1]. In Europe, it influenced other printing techniques like engraving and etching. Today, artists and craftspeople still use and innovate woodblock printing, keeping this ancient technique alive.

The Incas of Peru, Chile and the Aztecs of Mexico also practiced textile printing previous to the Spanish Invasion in 1519.

During the later half of the 17th century the French brought directly by sea, from their colonies on the east coast of India, samples of Indian blue and white resist prints, and along with them, particulars of the processes by which they had been produced, which produced washable fabrics.

As early as the 1630s, the East India Company was bringing in printed and plain cotton for the English market. By the 1660s British printers and dyers were making their own printed cotton to sell at home, printing single colours on plain backgrounds; less colourful than the imported prints, but more to the taste of the British. Designs were also sent to India for their craftspeople to copy for export back to England. There were many dyehouses in England in the latter half of the 17th century, Lancaster being one area and on the River Lea near London another. Plain cloth was put through a prolonged bleaching process which prepared the material to receive and hold applied colour; this process vastly improved the colour durability of English calicoes and required a great deal of water from nearby rivers. One dyehouse was started by John Meakins, a London Quaker who lived in Cripplegate. When he died, he passed his dyehouse to his son-in-law Benjamin Ollive, Citizen and Dyer, who moved the dye-works to Bromley Hall where it remained in the family until 1823, known as Benjamin Ollive and Company, Ollive & Talwin, Joseph Talwin & Company and later Talwin & Foster. Samples of their fabrics and designs can be found in the Victoria and Albert Museum in London and the Cooper Hewitt, Smithsonian Design Museum in New York.

On the continent of Europe the commercial importance of calico printing seems to have been almost immediately recognized, and in consequence it spread and developed there much more rapidly than in England, where it was neglected for nearly ninety years after its introduction. During the last two decades of the 17th century and the earlier ones of the 18th new dye works were started in France, Germany, Switzerland and Austria. It was only in 1738 that calico printing was first practiced in Scotland, and not until twenty-six years later that Messrs Clayton of Bamber Bridge, near Preston, established in 1764 the first print-works in Lancashire, and thus laid the foundation of the industry.

From an artistic point of view most of the pioneer work in calico printing was done by the French. From the early days of the industry down to the latter half of the 20th century, the productions of the French printers in Jouy, Beauvais, Rouen, and in Alsace-Lorraine, were looked upon as representing all that was best in artistic calico printing.

== Methods ==
Traditional textile printing techniques may be broadly categorized into four styles:

- Direct printing, in which colourants containing dyes, thickeners, and the mordants or substances necessary for fixing the colour on the cloth are printed in the desired pattern.
- The printing of a mordant in the desired pattern prior to dyeing cloth; the colour adheres only where the mordant was printed.
- Resist dyeing, in which a wax or other substance is printed onto fabric which is subsequently dyed. The waxed areas do not accept the dye, leaving uncoloured patterns against a coloured ground.
- Discharge printing, in which a bleaching agent is printed onto previously dyed fabrics to remove some or all of the colour.

Resist and discharge techniques were particularly fashionable in the 19th century, as were combination techniques in which indigo resist was used to create blue backgrounds prior to block-printing of other colours. Modern industrial printing mainly uses direct printing techniques.

The printing process does involve several stages in order to prepare the fabric and printing paste, and to fix the impression permanently on the fabric:

- pre-treatment of fabric,
- preparation of colours,
- preparation of printing paste,
- impression of paste on fabric using printing methods,
- drying of fabric,
- fixing the printing with steam or hot air (for pigments),
- after process treatments.

=== Preparation of cloth for printing ===
Cloth is prepared by washing and bleaching. For a coloured ground it is then dyed. The cloth has always to be brushed, to free it from loose nap, flocks and dust that it picks up whilst stored. Frequently, too, it has to be sheared by being passed over rapidly revolving knives arranged spirally round an axle, which rapidly and effectually cuts off all filaments and knots, leaving the cloth perfectly smooth and clean and in a condition fit to receive impressions of the most delicate engraving. Some fabrics require very careful stretching and straightening on a stenter before they are wound around hollow wooden or iron centers into rolls of convenient size for mounting on the printing machines.

=== Preparation of colours ===
The art of making colours for textile printing demands both chemical knowledge and extensive technical experience, for their ingredients must not only be in proper proportion to each other, but also specially chosen and compounded for the particular style of work in hand. A colour must comply to conditions such as shade, quality and fastness; where more colours are associated in the same design each must be capable of withstanding the various operations necessary for the development and fixation of the others. All printing pastes whether containing colouring matter or not are known technically as colours.

Colours vary considerably in composition. Most of them contain all the elements necessary for direct production and fixation. Some, however, contain the colouring matter alone and require various after-treatments; and others again are simply thickened mordants. A mordant is a metallic salt or other substance that combines with the dye to form an insoluble colour, either directly by steaming, or indirectly by dyeing. All printing colours require thickening to enable them to be transferred from colour-box to cloth without running or spreading beyond the limits of the pattern.

==== Thickening agents ====
The printing thickeners used depend on the printing technique, the fabric and the particular dyestuff . Typical thickening agents are starch derivatives, flour, gum arabic, guar gum derivatives, tamarind, sodium alginate, sodium polyacrylate, gum Senegal and gum tragacanth, British gum or dextrin and albumen.

Hot-water-soluble thickening agents such as native starch are made into pastes by boiling in double or jacketed pans. Most thickening agents used today are cold-soluble and require only extensive stirring.

Starch paste

Starch paste is made from wheat starch, cold water, and olive oil, then thickened by boiling. Non-modified starch is applicable to all but strongly alkaline or strongly acid colours. With the former it thickens up to a stiff unworkable jelly. In the case of the latter, while mineral acids or acid salts convert it into dextrin, thus diminishing its viscosity or thickening power, organic acids do not have that effect. Today, modified carboxymethylated cold soluble starches are mainly used. These have a stable viscosity and are easy to rinse out of the fabric and give reproducible "short" paste rheology.

Flour paste is made in a similar way to starch paste; it is sometimes used to thicken aluminum and iron mordants. Starch paste resists of rice flour have been used for several centuries in Japan.

Gums

Gum arabic and gum Senegal are both traditional thickenings, but expense prevents them from being used for any but pale, delicate tints. They are especially useful thickenings for the light ground colours of soft muslins and 9 penetrate as well into the fibre of the cloth or as deeply as pure starch or flour and is unsuitable for very dark, strong colours.

Gum tragacanth, or Dragon, which may be mixed in any proportion with starch or flour, is equally useful for pigment colours and mordant colours. When added to a starch paste it increases its penetrative power and adds to its softness without diminishing its thickness, making it easier to wash out of the fabric. It produces much more even colours than does starch paste alone. Used by itself it is suitable for printing all kinds of dark grounds on goods that are required to retain their soft "clothy" feel.

Starch always leaves the printed cloth somewhat harsh in feeling (unless modified carboxymethylated starches are used), but very dark colours can be obtained. Gum Senegal, gum arabic or modified guar gum thickening yield clearer and more even tints than does starch, suitable for lighter colours but less suited for very dark colours. (The gums apparently prevent the colours from combining fully with the fibers.) A printing stock solution is mostly a combination of modified starch and gum stock solutions.

Albumen

Albumen is both a thickening and a fixing agent for insoluble pigments. Chrome yellow, the ochres, vermilion and ultramarine are such pigments. Albumen is always dissolved in the cold, a process that takes several days when large quantities are required. Egg albumen is expensive and only used for the lightest shades. Blood albumen solution is used in cases when very dark colours are required to be absolutely fast to washing. After printing, albumen thickened colours are exposed to hot steam, which coagulates the albumen and effectually fixes the colours.

=== Printing paste preparation ===
Combinations of cold water-soluble carboxymethylated starch, guar gum and tamarind derivatives are most commonly used today in disperse screen printing on polyester. Alginates are used for cotton printing with reactive dyes, sodium polyacrylates for pigment printing, and in the case of vat dyes on cotton only carboxymethylated starch is used.

Formerly, colours were always prepared for printing by boiling the thickening agent, the colouring matter and solvents, together, then cooling and adding various fixing agents. At the present time, however, concentrated solutions of the colouring matters and other adjuncts are often simply added to the cold thickenings, of which large quantities are kept in stock. Colours are reduced in shade by simply adding more stock (printing) paste. For example, a dark blue containing 4 oz. of methylene blue per gallon may readily be made into a pale shade by adding to it thirty times its bulk of starch paste or gum, as the case may be. The procedure is similar for other colours.

Before printing it is essential to strain or sieve all colours in order to free them from lumps, fine sand, and other impurities, which would inevitably damage the highly polished surface of the engraved rollers and result in bad printing. Every scratch on the surface of a roller prints a fine line on the cloth, and too much care, therefore, cannot be taken to remove, as far as possible, all grit and other hard particles from every colour.

Straining is usually done by squeezing the colour through filter cloths like artisanal fine cotton, silk or industrial woven nylon. Fine sieves can also be employed for colours that are used hot or are very strongly alkaline or acid.

== Methods of printing ==
There are eight distinct methods presently used to impress coloured patterns on cloth:

- Hand block printing
- Perrotine printing
- Engraved copperplate printing
- Roller, cylinder, or machine printing
- Stencil printing
- Screen printing
- Digital textile printing
- Flexo textile printing
- Discharge printing
- Heat transfer printing

== Gallery ==
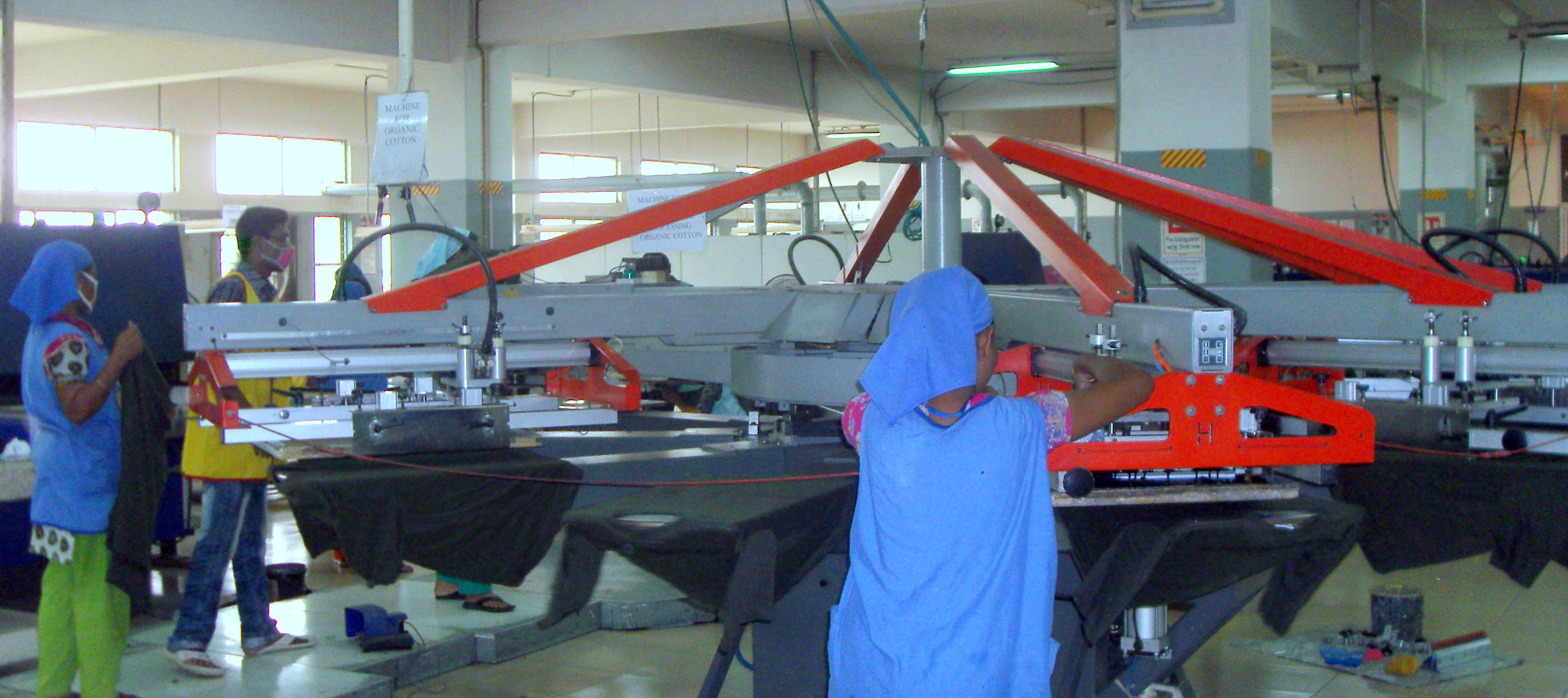
Digital textile printing by Octopus printing machine in a RMG factory of Bangladesh

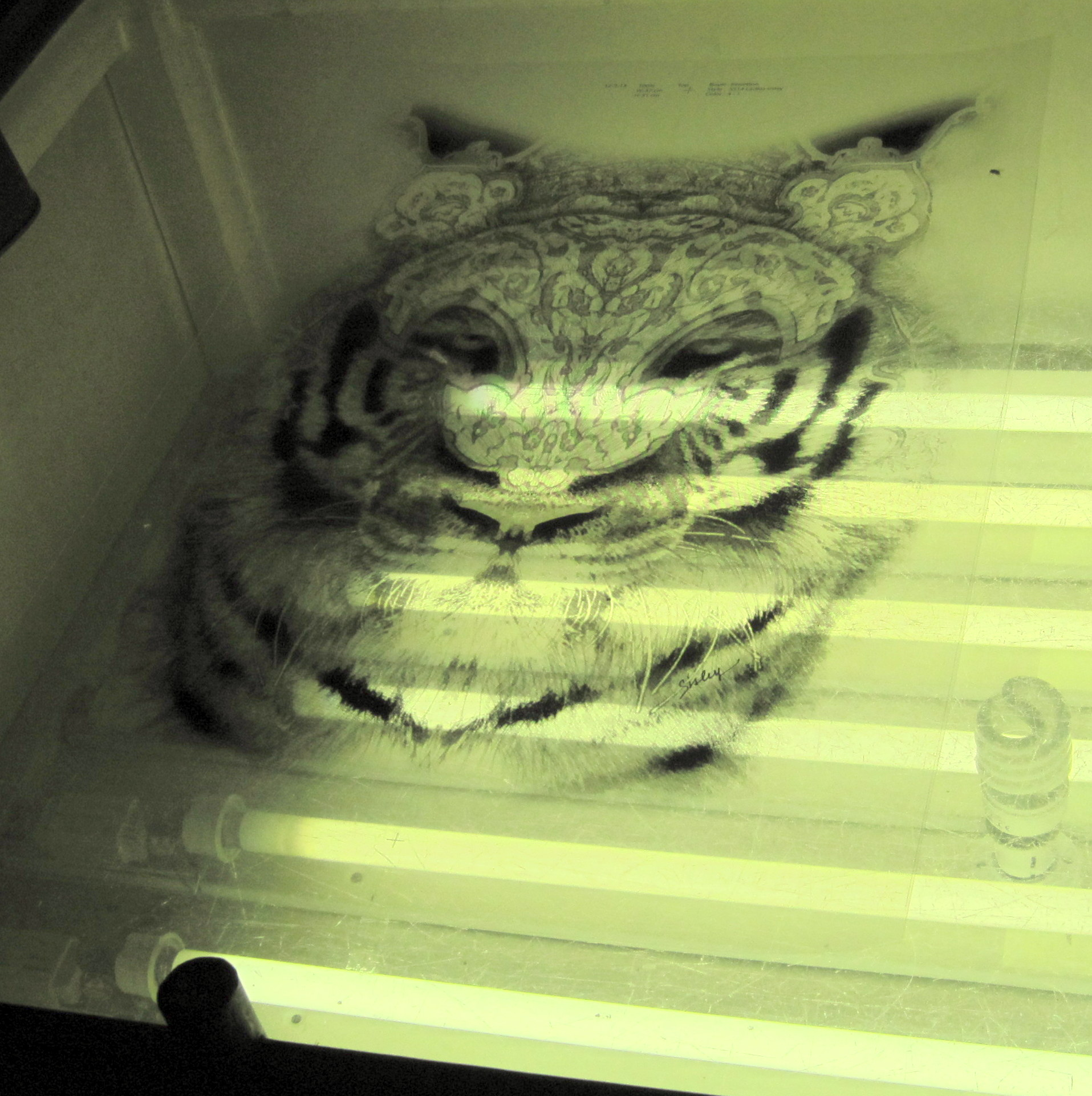
Printing Negative of T-shirt

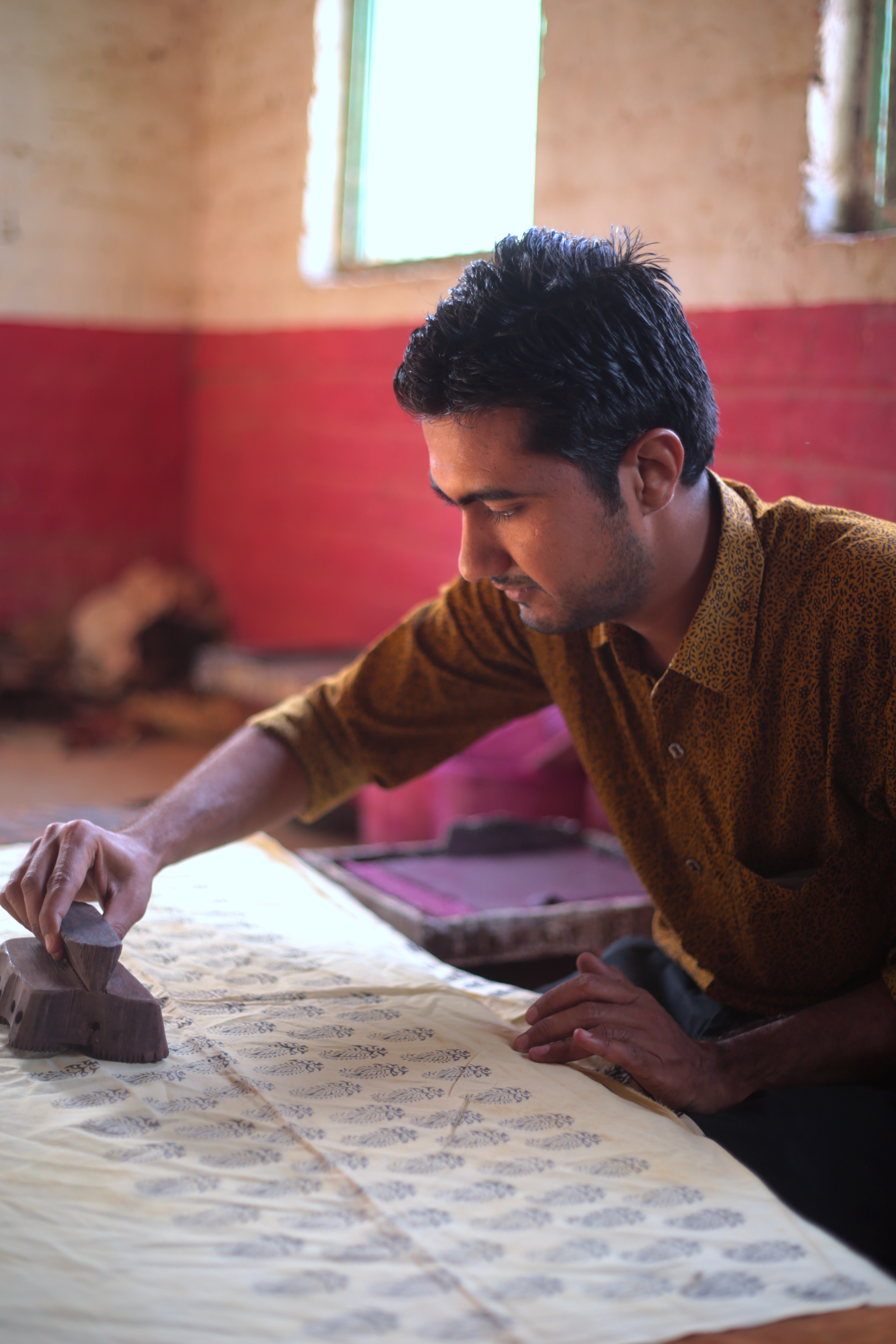
Bagh Print Traditional hand block print craft in Village Bagh Madhya Pradesh, India

=== Block printing ===
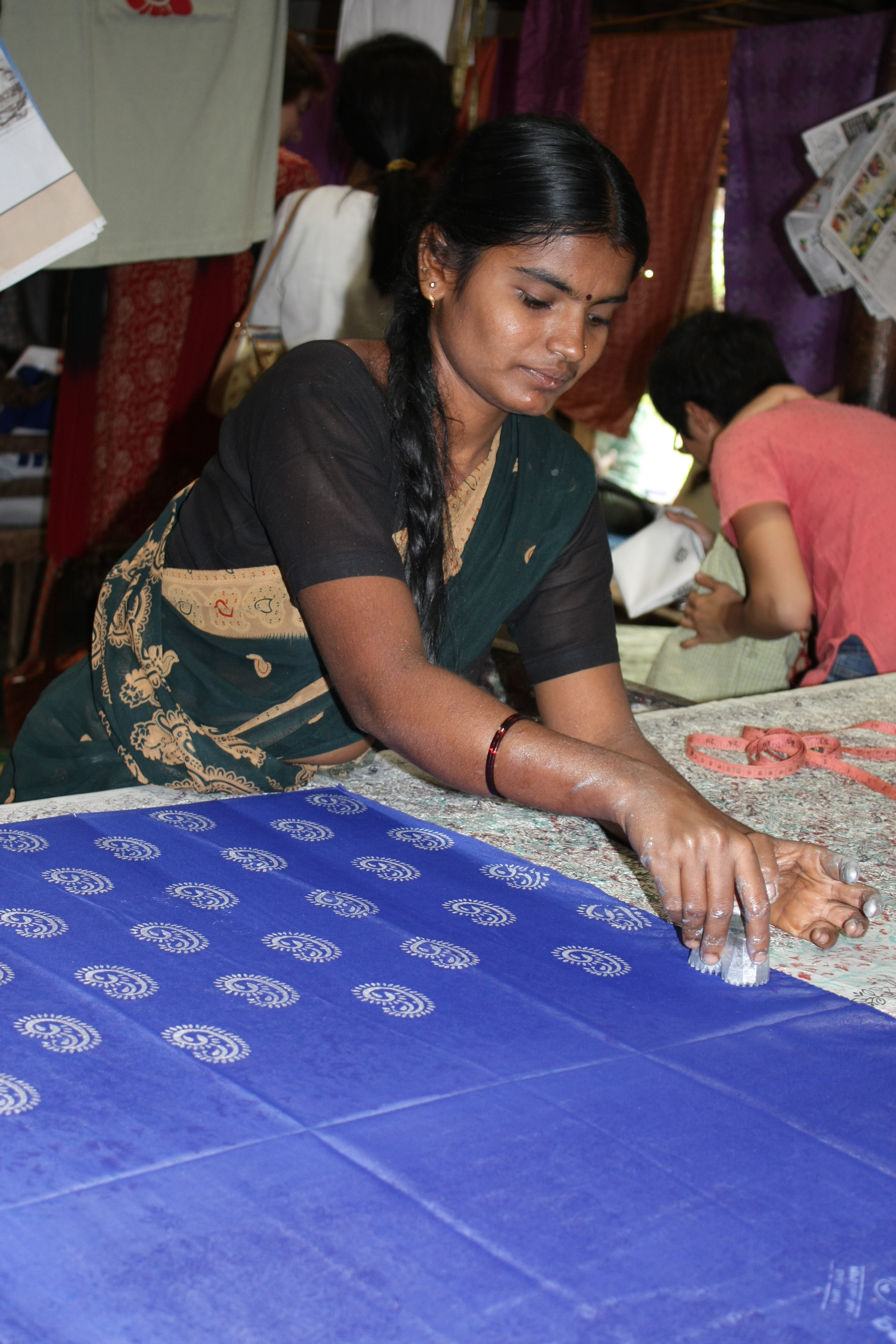
Woman doing block printing at Halasur village, Karnataka, India

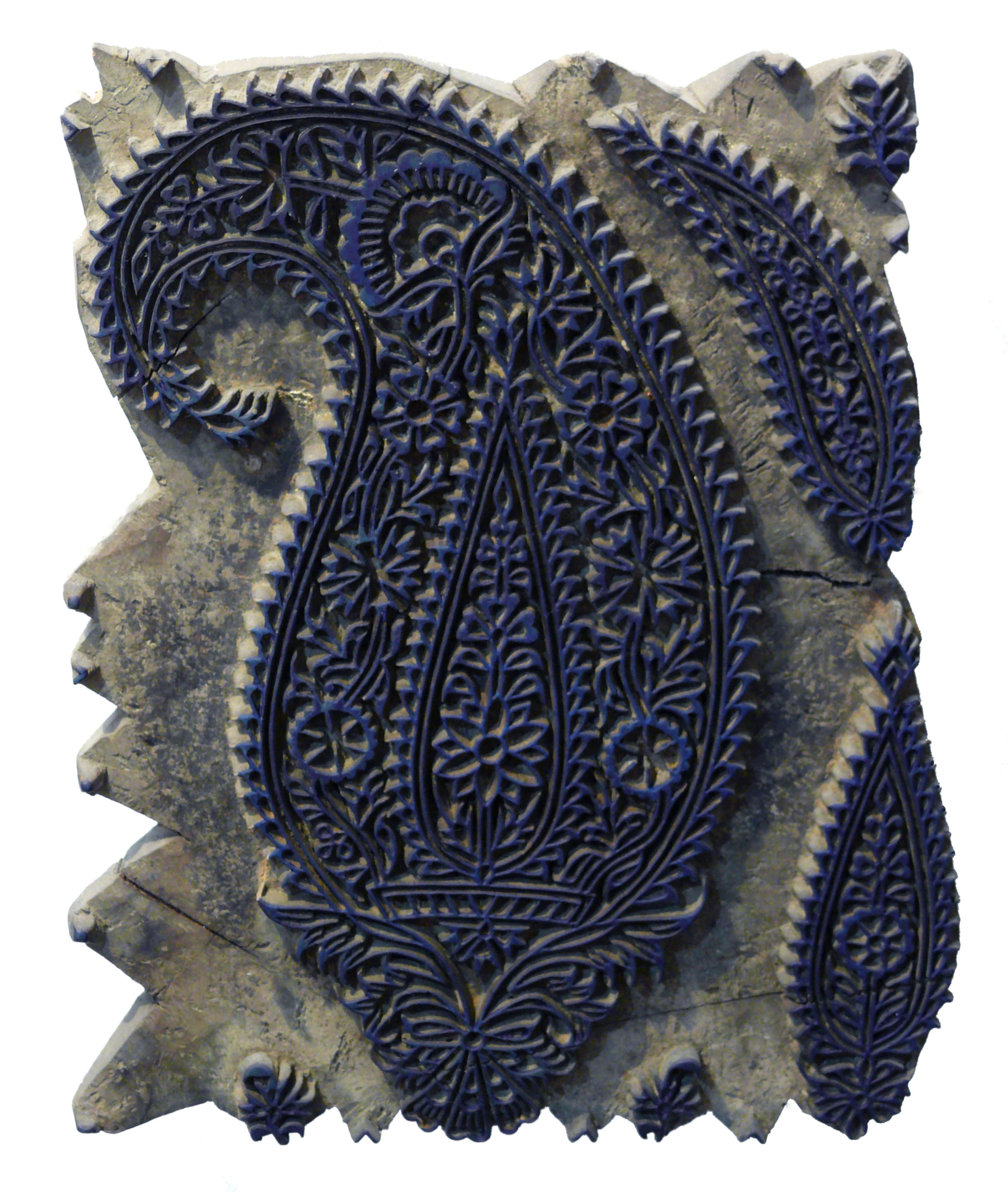
Wood handstamp for the textile printing of traditional paisley designs, Isfahan, Iran

This process is the earliest, simplest and slowest of all printing methods. A design is drawn on, or transferred to, prepared wooden blocks. A separate block is required for each distinct colour in the design. A block cutter carves out the wood around the heavier masses first, leaving the finer and more delicate work until the last so as to avoid any risk of injuring it when the coarser parts are cut. When finished, the block has the appearance of a flat relief carving, with the design standing out. Fine details, difficult to cut in wood, are built up in strips of brass or copper, which is bent to shape and driven edgewise into the flat surface of the block. This method is known as coppering.

The printer applies colour to the block and presses it firmly and steadily on the cloth, striking it smartly on the back with a wooden mallet. The second impression is made in the same way, the printer taking care to see that it registers exactly with the first. Pins at each corner of the block join up exactly, so that the pattern can continue without a break. Each succeeding impression is made in precisely the same manner until the length of cloth is fully printed. The cloth is then wound over drying rollers. If the pattern contains several colours the cloth is first printed throughout with one colour, dried, and then printed with the next.

Block printing by hand is a slow process. It is, however, capable of yielding highly artistic results, some of which are unobtainable by any other method. William Morris used this technique in some of his fabrics.

=== Perrotine printing ===
The perrotine is a block-printing machine invented by Perrot of Rouen in 1834 and is now only of historical interest.

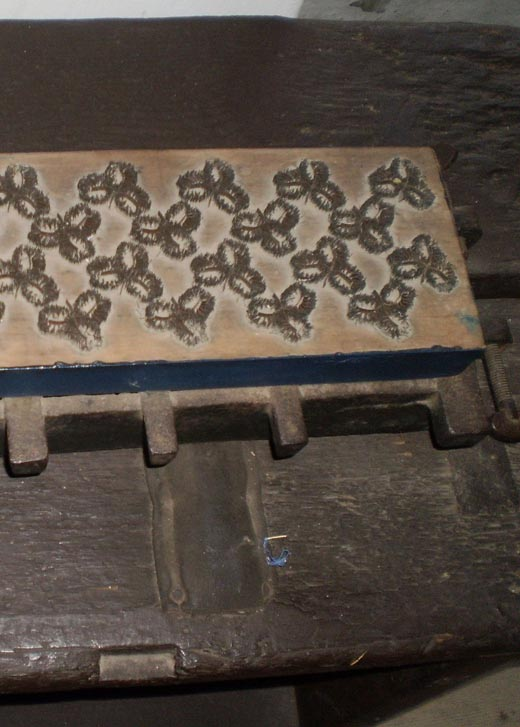
A Perrotine printing block

=== Roller, cylinder, or machine printing ===
This process was patented by Thomas Bell in 1785, fifteen years after his use of an engraved plate to print textiles. Bell's patent was for a machine to print six colours at once, but, probably owing to its incomplete development, it was not immediately successful. One colour could be printed with satisfactorily; the difficulty was to keep the six rollers in register with each other. This defect was overcome by Adam Parkinson of Manchester in 1785. That year, Bell's machine with Parkinson's improvement was successfully employed by Messrs Livesey, Hargreaves and Company of Bamber Bridge, Preston, for the printing of calico in from two to six colours at a single operation.

Roller printing was highly productive, 10,000 to 12,000 yards being commonly printed in one day of ten hours by a single-colour machine. It is capable of reproducing every style of design, ranging from the fine delicate lines of copperplate engraving to the small repeats and limited colours of the perrotine to the broadest effects of block printing with repeats from 1 in to 80 inches. It is precise, so each portion of an elaborate multicolour pattern can be fitted into its proper place without faulty joints at the points of repetition.

=== Stencil printing ===
The art of stenciling on textile fabrics has been practiced from time immemorial by the Japanese, and found increasing employment in Europe for certain classes of decorative work on woven goods during the late 19th century. A pattern is cut from a sheet of stout paper or thin metal with a sharp-pointed knife, the uncut portions representing the part that will be left uncoloured. The sheet is laid on the fabric and colour is brushed through its interstices. The peculiarity of stenciled patterns is that they have to be held together by ties. For instance, a complete circle cannot be cut without its centre dropping out, so its outline has to be interrupted at convenient points by ties or uncut portions. This limitation influences the design.

For single-colour work a stenciling machine was patented in 1894 by S. H. Sharp. It consists of an endless stencil plate of thin sheet steel that passes continuously over a revolving cast iron cylinder. The cloth to be ornamented passes between the two and the colour is forced onto it through the holes in the stencil by mechanical means.

=== Screen-printing ===
Screen printing is by far the most common technology today. Two types exist: rotary screen printing and flat (bed) screen printing. A blade (squeegee) squeezes the printing paste through openings in the screen onto the fabric.

=== Digital textile printing ===
Digital textile printing is often referred to as direct-to-garment printing (DTG printing), or digital garment printing. It is a process of printing on textiles and garments using specialized or modified inkjet technology. Inkjet printing on fabric is also possible with an inkjet printer by using fabric sheets with a removable paper backing. Today, major inkjet technology manufacturers can offer specialized products designed for direct printing on textiles, not only for sampling but also for bulk production. Since the early 1990s, inkjet technology and specially developed water-based ink (known as dye-sublimation or disperse direct ink) have made it possible to print directly onto polyester fabric. This is mainly related to visual communication in retail and brand promotion (flags, banners and other point of sales applications). Printing onto nylon and silk can be done by using an acid ink. Reactive ink is used for cellulose based fibers such as cotton and linen. Inkjet technology in digital textile printing allows for single pieces, mid-run production and even long-run alternatives to screen printed fabric.

A similar printing method: Direct-To-Film printing (DTF printing) can also make the digital textile printing. The difference from DTG printing is that DTF printing first prints on a special transfer film while DTG printing prints on the substrate. One of the advantage of DTF printing is that it is more cost effective.

=== Flexo textile printing ===
Flexo textile printing on textile fabric was successful in China in the last 4 years. Central Impression Flexo, Rubber Sleeves as the printing plate in round engraved by laser (Direct Laser Engraving), Anilox in Sleeve technologies are applicated in the area. Not only the solid, but also 6 to 8 colours in fine register, higher resolution ratio and higher productivity which are the outstanding advantages extraordinary different from the traditional screen textile printing. Aerospace Huayang, Hell system, SPGPrints and Felix Böttcher contributed their technologies and efforts.

=== Other methods of printing ===
Although most work is executed throughout by one or another of the seven distinct processes mentioned above, combinations are frequently employed. Sometimes a pattern is printed partly by machine and partly by block, and sometimes a cylindrical block is used along with engraved copper-rollers in an ordinary printing machine. The block in this latter case is in all respects, except for shape, identical with a flat wood or coppered block, but, instead of being dipped in colour, it receives its supply from an endless blanket, one part of which works in contact with colour-furnishing rollers and the other part with the cylindrical block. This block is known as a surface or peg roller. Many attempts have been made to print multicolour patterns with surface rollers alone, but hitherto with little success, owing to their irregularity in action and to the difficulty of preventing them from warping. These defects are not present in the printing of linoleum in which opaque oil colours are used, colours that neither sink into the body of the hard linoleum nor tend to warp the roller.

Lithographic printing has been applied to textile fabrics with qualified success. Its irregularity and the difficulty of registering repeats have restricted its use to the production of decorative panels, equal or smaller in size to the plate or stone.

== Calico printing ==
Goods intended for calico printing are well-bleached; otherwise stains and other serious defects are certain to arise during subsequent operations.

The chemical preparations used for special styles will be mentioned in their proper places; but a general prepare, employed for most colours that are developed and fixed by steaming only, consists in passing the bleached calico through a weak solution of sulphated or turkey red oil containing 2.5 to 5 percent fatty acid. Some colours are printed on pure bleached cloth, but all patterns containing alizarin red, rose and salmon shades are considerably brightened by the presence of oil, and indeed very few, if any, colours are detrimentally affected by it.

The cloth is always brushed to free it from loose nap, flocks and dust that it picks up whilst stored. Frequently, too, it has to be sheared by being passed over rapidly revolving knives arranged spirally round an axle, which rapidly and effectually cuts off all filaments and knots, leaving the cloth perfectly smooth and clean. It is then stentered, wound onto a beam, and mounting on the printing machines.

== Woollen printing ==
The printing of wool differs little from the printing of cotton in general. Most of the colours employed in the one industry are used in the other, and the operations of steaming, washing and soaping are almost identical. Unlike cotton, however, wool requires special preparation, after bleaching, if the full tinctorial value of the colours is to be obtained.

Two quite different methods of preparation are used, namely (1) the chlorination of the wool; and (2) the precipitation of stannic acid on the fibre. In the first method the woollen fabric is first passed through a solution of bleaching powder, then well squeezed and passed, without washing, into dilute sulphuric or hydrochloric acid, squeezed again and well washed in water, after which it is dried. Great care and experience are demanded in this operation to prevent the wool from becoming hard and yellow. In the second method the cloth is padded in sodium stannate, well squeezed, passed into dilute sulphuric acid, well washed and dried. For certain styles of work it is necessary to combine both preparations.

Although alizarin, mordant colours and dyewood extracts can be used on wool, the vast majority of patterns printed on wool are executed by means of acid dye-stuffs and basic colours, for both of which this fibre possesses a natural affinity. In most cases therefore these colours are simply dissolved in a little acetic and citric acids, thickened with gum and printed without any further addition. The addition of tannic acid, however, can be made to, and considerably increases the fastness of, the basic dyes. Mordant colours like logwood black are applied in the usual way. The printing of wool is carried out exactly as for cotton, but if the best results are to be obtained, the engraving of the rollers must be deep, the blanket on the machine as soft as possible, and the drying of the printed cloth very gentle. After printing, the goods are steamed in moist steam or wrapped between moistened "greys" and steamed in a "cottage" steamer. If too little moisture is given, the colours lack both strength and brilliancy; if too much they run. The correct degree of dampness can only be determined by experience of the work, combined with a special knowledge of the particular apparatus employed.

After steaming, the printed goods are washed in plenty of water, then dried and finished with a little glycerol or some waxy preparation.

Discharges may be very easily obtained on wool dyed in acid dye-stuffs, by means of stannous chloride and basic colours for the coloured effect, and hydrosulphite for the white.

== Silk printing ==
The colours and methods employed are the same as for wool, except that in the case of silk no preparation of the material is required before printing, and ordinary dry steaming is preferable to damp steaming.

Both acid and basic dyes play an important role in silk printing, which for the most part is confined to the production of articles for fashion goods, handkerchiefs, and scarves, all articles for which bright colours are in demand. Alizarine and other mordant colours are mainly used for any goods that have to resist repeated washings or prolonged exposure to light. In this case the silk frequently must be prepared in alizarine oil, after which it is treated in all respects like cotton, namely steamed, washed and soaped, the colours used being the same.

Silk is especially adapted to discharge and reserve effects. Most of the acid dyes can be discharged in the same way as when they are dyed on wool. Reserved effects are produced by printing mechanical resists, such as waxes and fats, on the cloth and then dyeing it in cold dye-liquor. The great affinity of the silk fibre for basic and acid dyestuffs enables it to extract colouring matter from cold solutions and permanently combine with it to form an insoluble lake. After dyeing, the reserve prints are washed, first in cold water to remove any colour not fixed onto the fibre, and then in hot water or benzene to dissolve out the resisting bodies.

After steaming, silk goods are normally only washed in hot water, but those printed entirely in mordant dyes will stand soaping, and indeed require it to brighten the colours and soften the material.

Some silk dyes do not require heat setting or steaming. They strike instantly, allowing the designer to dye colour upon colour. These dyes are intended mostly for silk scarf dyeing. They also dye bamboo, rayon, linen, and some other natural fabrics like hemp and wool to a lesser extent, but do not set on cotton.

== See also ==
- Batik
- Digital textile printing
- Screen printing
- Transfer-print
- Woodblock printing
- Dunging
