= Ice-dye =

Method of dying fabric

Ice-dye is a method of dying fabric. The process consists of crumpling or folding a shirt (similar to tie-dye), then covering it with ice and dye powder. As the ice melts, the dye dissolves and flows throughout the shirt, producing interesting patterns. Lynda Heines is credited with inventing ice-dying in 2011, as a way to do snow dying when snow was unavailable.

== Designs and patterns ==
Ice-dye can be used to create a wide variety of patterns. It can be used to produce traditional tie-dye patterns, such as spirals, but also new unique patters, such as geode dyes. A distinctive characteristic of ice dying is that when the ice melts, dyes will migrate differently throughout the cloth, leading to interesting changes in coloring. As such, some companies make dyes specifically for ice-dyeing, as they produce a variety of colors with this method.
