= Leo Goldberger (manufacturer) =

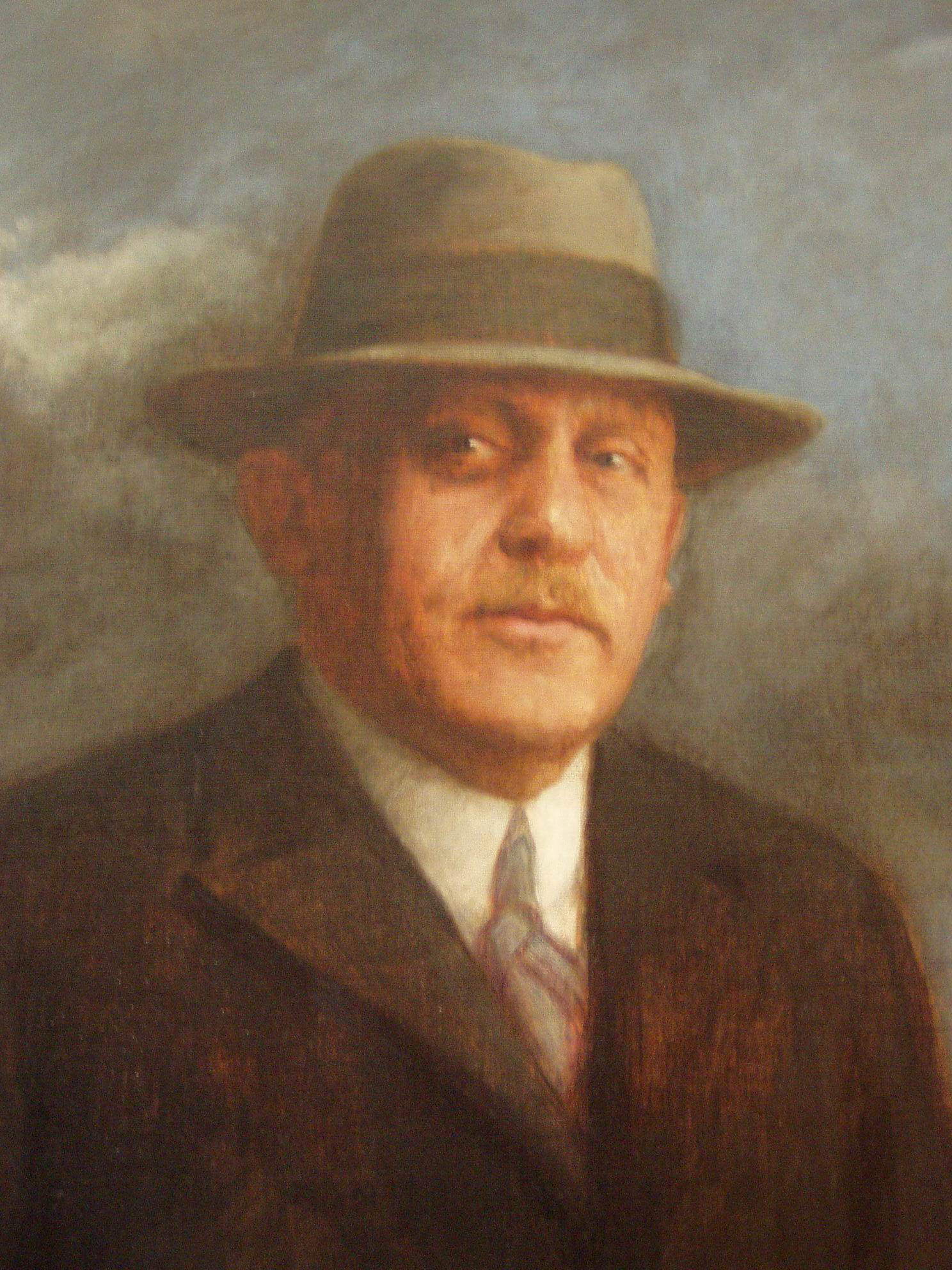
Leó Goldberger (Portrait by Gyula Glatter, before 1927)

Leó Goldberger (2 May 1878, Budapest – 5 May 1945, Mauthausen), was a Hungarian textile industrialist and art collector. He was arrested by the Gestapo during the German occupation of Hungary and died shortly after the liberation of the Mauthausen concentration camp, where he had been imprisoned due to his Jewish heritage.

Goldberger was chairman and managing director of the Goldberger textile factory, founded in 1785. He played a pivotal role in the modernization of Hungary's textile industry during the early 20th century. His influence extended across numerous industrial and economic institutions: he was director of the National Association of Industrialists (GYOSZ), president of the National Association of Hungarian Textile Manufacturers, a board member of the Hungarian Institute of Foreign Trade, and a senior adviser to the Hungarian National Bank. In 1935, he was appointed to the Hungarian House of Lords.

On 19 March 1944, the day of the German invasion of Hungary, Goldberger was arrested by the Gestapo. He was deported to Mauthausen, where he died on 5 May 1945, just days after the camp was liberated.

== History of the Goldberger family ==
The ancestor of the Goldberger family, Perec, was a goldsmith who, according to family tradition, migrated to Hungary either from Padua or Venice in Italy—or, according to other theories, from Moravia—and settled in Óbuda. His son, Ferenc Goldberg, later changed the family name to Goldberger in the early 19th century. Born in Óbuda in 1755, Ferenc initially worked in textile trading. In 1785, in partnership with a Czech bluemaker named Stibrall, he established a textile dyeing (bluemaking) factory on what is now Lajos Street in Budapest, in the building that currently houses the Textile Museum. This marked the beginning of the Goldberger Textile Factory.

The factory's products soon became highly popular. In Budapest, it operated both a warehouse and a retail store—the latter being among the first establishments in the city to introduce gas lighting (using gas stored in a hose to fuel burners), following the National Theatre and the Pilvax Café. Ferenc Goldberger expanded the business by acquiring two adjacent properties next to the family residence and enlarging the factory behind them.

Ferenc's son, Sámuel Goldberger (1784–1848), succeeded him in managing the business. From 1810 onward, Sámuel was primarily responsible for production while his father focused on sales. In 1845, he purchased a perrotine machine, the most advanced textile-printing technology of its time.

The Goldberger family supported the Hungarian Revolution and War of Independence of 1848–49, including by producing uniforms for the revolutionary army. Following the defeat of the revolution, they were subjected to heavy war levies and had to surrender a substantial portion of their inventory.

After Sámuel’s death in 1848, his widow, Elisabeth Adler, took over the management of the factory. Under her leadership, the company recovered quickly, and in 1854, it was again granted the right to operate as a wholesale business. She retired in 1861 (and died in 1869), passing the business on to her sons.

In 1857, during a visit to Pest-Buda, Emperor Franz Joseph I visited the Goldberger factory, a gesture interpreted as symbolic forgiveness for the family's support of the revolution. A decade later, in 1867, the Goldberger family was ennobled and granted the right to use the prefix Buday, becoming the Buday-Goldberger family.

Károly Goldberger assumed leadership of the factory in 1870. He was succeeded in 1876 by his eldest son, Berthold Goldberger, who directed the company until his death in 1913. During Berthold’s tenure, the company modernized its production methods, replacing outdated perrotine presses with cylinder presses, and achieved significant commercial success both domestically and internationally. The company also adopted the name Sám. und F. Rt., a reference to Sámuel and Ferenc Goldberger, its founding figures.

== Leó Goldberger's career ==
Leó Goldberger was born on 2 May 1878, the second son of Berthold Goldberger. He studied law in Budapest and Vienna, and eventually joined the management of the family textile company. He was managing director and chief executive officer, and following his father’s death, assumed the roles of vice president and CEO. In 1920, he became chairman and chief executive officer of the company.

The company supplied textiles to the military during the First World War. Due to wartime shortages in raw materials, Goldberger began planning the construction of an in-house spinning and weaving mill to complement the firm's existing fabric manufacturing and printing operations. This vision was realized in 1923, when the company opened a weaving mill in Kelenföld, partially funded by foreign investment. A spinning mill followed in 1927; together, these facilities later became known as the Kelenföldi Textilgyár (KELTEX).

In 1922, the company purchased its previously rented office building in central Budapest, located on what is now Arany János Street. The building was converted into the company’s new headquarters and warehouse. (The structure still stands today, with the original "Goldberger" inscription visible; it currently houses a department of Central European University.)

Goldberger was a pioneer of innovation in textile manufacturing. He quickly recognized the commercial potential of copper oxide rayon, a semi-synthetic fiber introduced in the early 20th century that resembled natural silk in softness and sheen. In 1919, he began producing ‘Parisette’—a line of rayon fabrics for dresses, blouses, and undergarments—after securing exclusive finishing rights from the German firm Bemberg.

During the 1930s, he introduced film printing technology and adopted synthetic indigo dyes. The company weathered the Great Depression relatively well. From 1934 onward, it established a network of international subsidiaries to market its products in the United Kingdom, Belgium, Italy, France, the United States, Canada, Australia, and several countries in Asia and Africa. It also incorporated several smaller domestic trading firms.

Between 1938 and 1939, the company reached its peak, receiving awards at multiple international exhibitions, while its "Parisette" fabrics achieved widespread acclaim.

== Philanthropist and art collector ==
Goldberger owned a 17th-century painting of Saint Andrew, attributed to Jusepe de Ribera. The painting is now part of the collection at the Museum of Fine Arts, Boston. The exact circumstances of its transfer from Goldberger’s collection to the United States remain unclear.

Goldberger maintained active relationships with writers, scientists, actors, and a wide range of professional, social, and charitable organizations, many of which he supported and was on the boards. In 1937, with his financial backing, the Department of Textile Chemistry was established at the Royal Hungarian Technical and Economic University. He was also a member of the House of Magnates, the upper house of the Hungarian parliament.

== Persecution and murder under the Nazis ==
As a Jewish businessman, Goldberger became a target due to the antisemitic racial laws enacted during the Nazi era. Following the passage of the Second Jewish Law (1939), Goldberger was granted special permission by the Minister of Industry to continue as the CEO of his company. However, after the occupation of Hungary by Nazi Germany, Goldberger was arrested by the Gestapo on 19 March 1944, the first day of the occupation. He was deported to the Mauthausen concentration camp, where he died from starvation on 5 May 1945.

== Postwar Goldberger factory after Leó Goldberger ==
In April 1944, the authorities ordered the dismantling of large factories and the transportation of their equipment to the West, which also applied to the Goldberger factory. However, the company did not comply with this order and continued production, albeit at a greatly reduced rate. Despite suffering considerable damage from bombings and the loss of export markets, production was gradually restarted after the war, although this process faced significant difficulties.

Mihály Burg became the chairman of the board of directors, and in 1945, Antal Goldberger, who had returned from a concentration camp, assumed the role of CEO. The company was nationalized on 26 March 1948 under the name Goldberger Textilművek és Kereskedelmi Rt. During the reorganizations of 1949 to 1950, the company was divided into two parts: the Kelenföld factory was transformed into the Kelenföld Textile Combine National Enterprise, and the Óbuda factory became the Goldberger Textile Printing and Finishing National Enterprise. In 1963, the textile industry underwent another major reorganization, leading to the creation of BUDAPRINT Cotton Printing Company ("Panyova") from a number of cotton companies, with the former Goldberger factory remaining as its headquarters. However, in 1989, BUDAPRINT went bankrupt, and liquidation proceedings were initiated against it as well as against BUDAPRINT Goldberger Textilművek Rt. The more than 200-year-old company was thus dissolved.
