= Discharge printing =

Textile printing technique

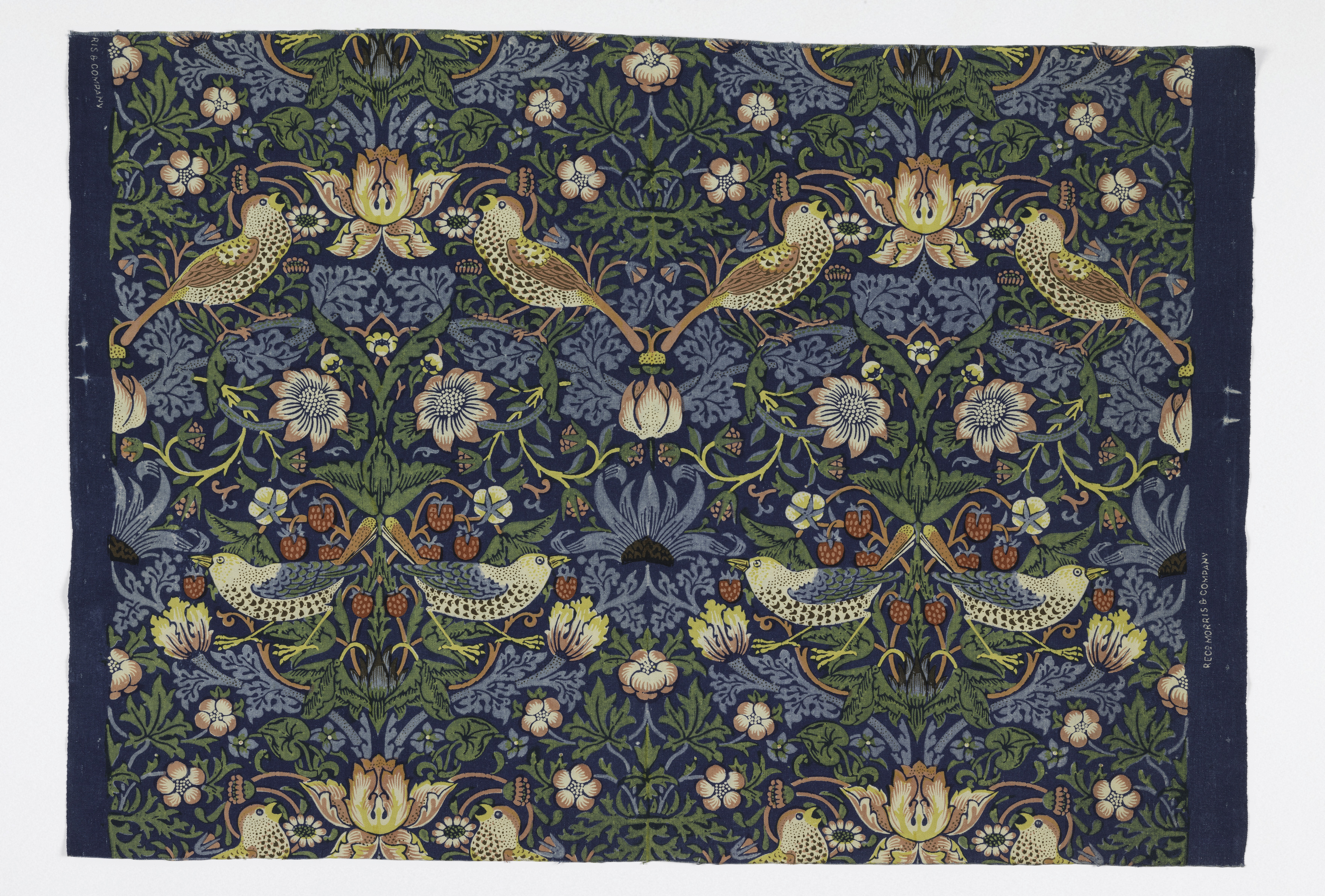
Strawberry Thief, c 1936. Designed by William Morris (British, 1834–1896). Plain weave cotton, discharge printed; overall: 88.3 x 99.1 cm (34 3/4 x 39 in.). The Cleveland Museum of Art, Gift of Mrs. Henry Chisholm 1937.696

Discharge printing is a textile printing technique that involves the application of a discharging agent to strip dye from already-dyed cloth in order to produce a printed pattern, which can be either white or colored. It is a method to imprint a design onto dyed fabric. The print pattern is achieved by applying a substance capable of removing the color, such as chlorine or hydrosulfite, to create a white or light pattern on a darker-hued dyed background. A dischargeable dye is employed for dischargeable printing.

== Process ==
Printing is the process of adding localized or patterned color to fabrics. Discharge printing involves dyeing first with dischargeable dyes; subsequently, the dyed fabric undergoes a printing process involving the application of a chemical-infused paste that effectively removes the color imparted by the dye. The process follows steaming and rinsing stages. The selection of reducing agent or stripping agent depends on the dye. "Extract printing" is simply another term for discharge printing.

=== Dye ===
Vinyl sulfone dyes have emerged as the predominant choice for discharge printing, largely owing to their distinctive chemical composition. Notably, the vinyl sulfone group undergoes breaking of bonds under the influence of reducing agents. In discharge printing, careful dye selection is necessary as certain dyes, like vat dye, resist discharge pastes.

==== Discharge paste ====
Discharge paste containing reducing agents is used to remove the colour from the dyed ground. Salts of sulfinic acid such as Rongalite may be used as they tend not to weaken the fabric.

==== Microorganisms in white discharge printing ====
Certain enzymes produced by bacteria can break down azo dyes and reduce methyl red to dimethyl p-phenylenediamine and o-aminobenzoic acid. These enzymes might be useful for white discharge printing on azo-dyed fabric. The bacteria responsible for producing these enzymes are identified as Bacillus sp. OY1-2, Xanthomonas sp. NR25-2, and Pseudomonas sp. PR41-1. As of 2007, enzymes including laccase were under exploration for their applications in discharge printing.

== Types of Discharge printing ==
=== White discharge printing ===
White polka dots on red background

The process of white discharge printing typically entails reducing the dye chemically, resulting in white patterns formed by removing the dyed color.

Fabrics made of denim or other indigo-dyed fabrics undergo a process of discharge using either potassium permanganate or sodium hypochlorite.

=== Colored discharge printing ===
When color-discharge printing is used, a dye that can withstand the reducing agent is combined with it. This creates a pattern of color on the fabric that was previously dyed, instead of remaining white.

== Notable patterns ==
=== Polka dots ===
The polka dot pattern, a pattern of sizable, solidly filled circles that are uniform in size, is a popular pattern with discharge print.

=== Strawberry Thief ===
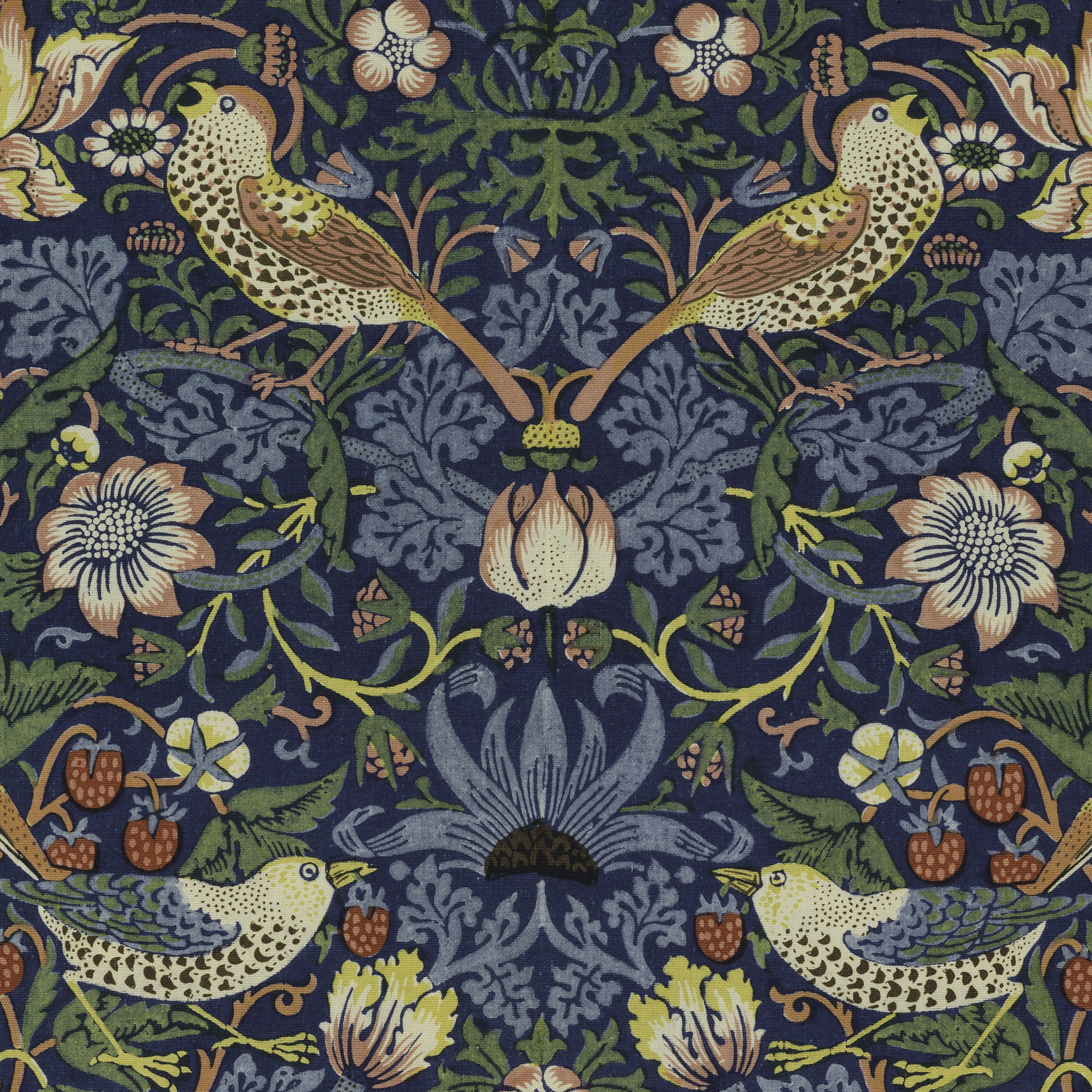
'Strawberry Thief', detail view

One of William Morris's most renowned textile patterns is 'Strawberry Thief', which stands out for its use of the discharge printing technique. The motif's origin can be traced back to the predation of strawberries by thrushes in the culinary garden of Kelmscott Manor, located in Oxfordshire. Morris utilized the indigo-discharge printing process to create detailed compositions with well-defined outlines. In 1884, he introduced two significant designs: 'Wandle', a remarkable repetition measuring 98.4 x 44.5cm, and 'Cray', which marked the completion of his outstanding contributions to the field of printed textiles.

== See also ==
- Batik
- Digital textile printing
- Screen printing
- Stripping (textiles)
- Transfer-print
- Woodblock printing
- Tie-dye
