= Perrotine printing =

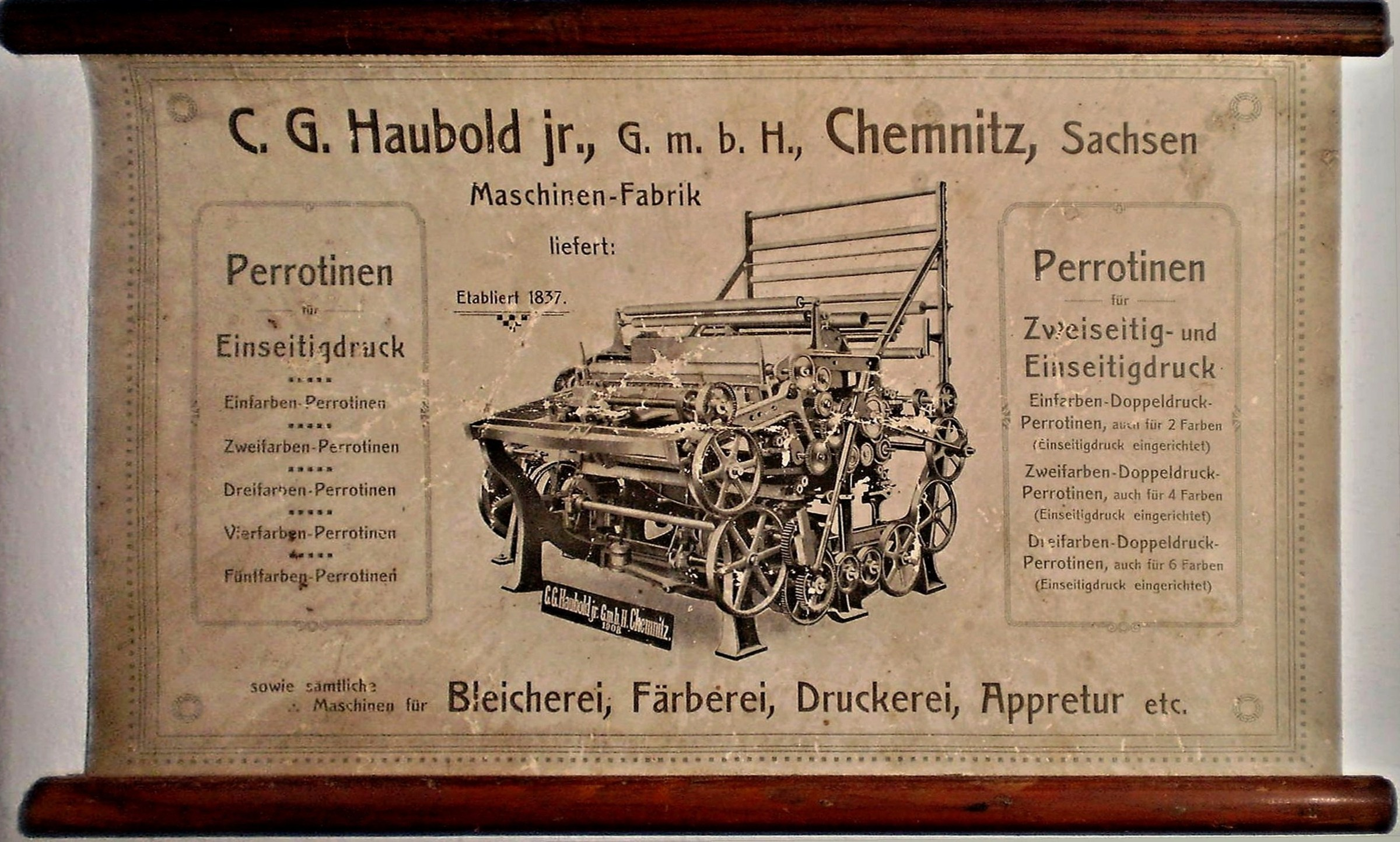
A perrotine printing machine

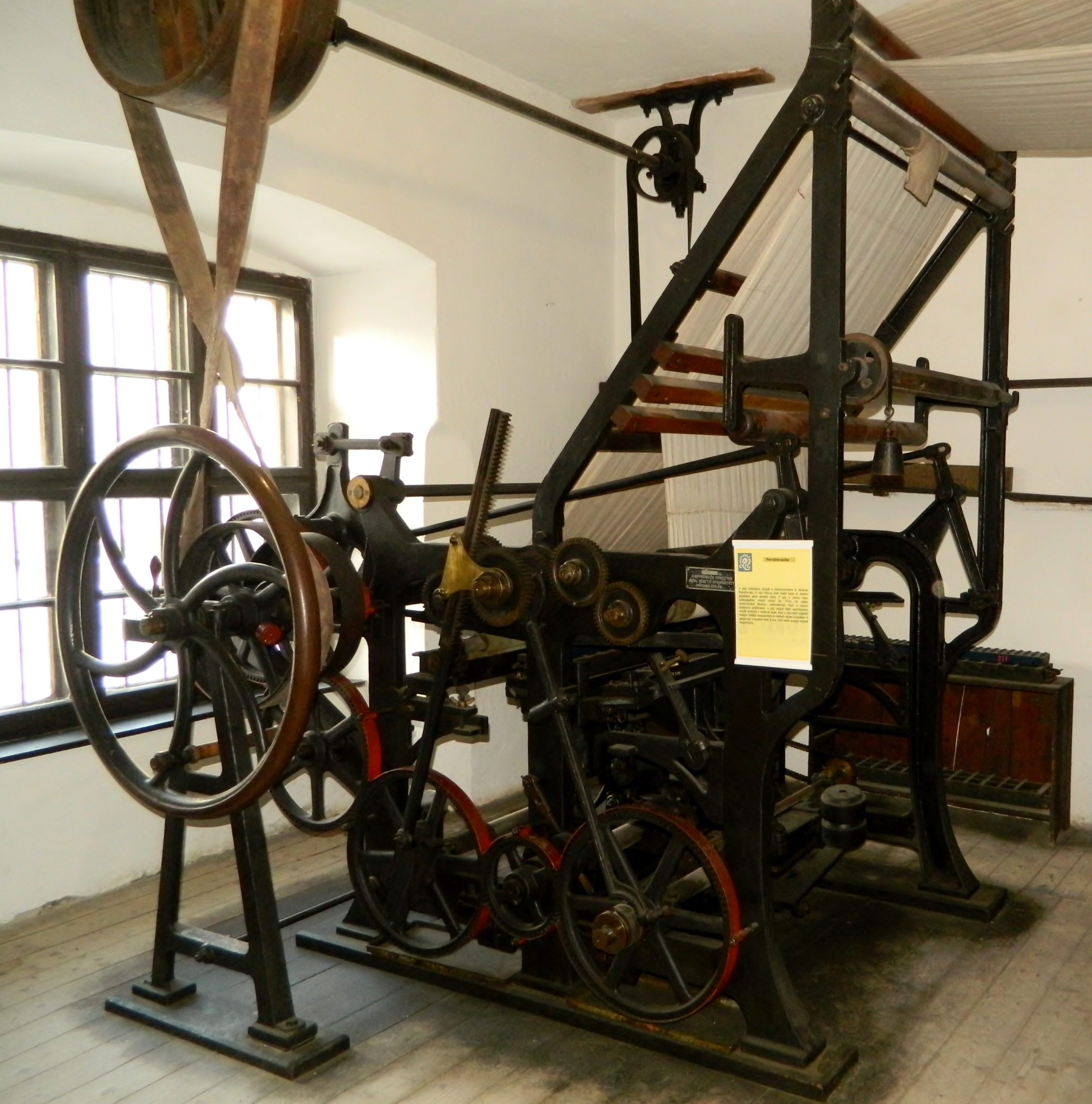
Double sided Perrotinen printing machine (1909) Haubold GmbH, Chemnitz (Blue Printing Museum Pápa, Hungary)

The perrotine is a block-printing machine invented by Louis-Jérôme Perrot (1798 in Senlis – 1878 in Paris), and practically speaking is the only successful mechanical device ever introduced for this purpose. For some reason or other it has rarely been used in England, but its value was almost immediately recognized on the Continent, and although block printing of all sorts has been replaced to such an enormous extent by roller printing, the perrotine is still largely employed in French, German, and Italian works.

== Operation ==
The machines mode of action is roughly as follows: Three large blocks (3 ft. long by 3 to 5 in. wide), with the pattern cut or cast on them in relief, are brought to bear successively on the three faces of a specially constructed printing table over which the cloth passes (together with its backing of printers blanket) after each impression.

The faces of the table are arranged at right angles to each other, and the blocks work in slides similarly placed, so that their engraved faces are perfectly parallel to the tables. Each block is moreover provided with its own particular colour trough, distributing brush, and woolen colour pad or sieve, and is supplied automatically with colour by these appliances during the whole time that the machine is in motion. The first effect of starting the machine is to cause the colour sieves, which have a reciprocating motion, to pass over, and receive a charge of colour from, the rollers, fixed to revolve, in the colour troughs. They then return to their original position between the tables and the printing blocks, coming in contact on the way with the distributing brushes, which spread the colour evenly over their entire surfaces.

At this point the blocks advance and are gently pressed twice against the colour pads (or sieves) which then retreat once more towards the colour troughs. During this last movement the cloth to be printed is drawn forward over the first table, and, immediately the colour pads are sufficiently out of the way, the block advances and, with some force, stamps the first impression on it. The second block is now put into gear and the foregoing operations are repeated for both blocks, the cloth advancing, after each impression, a distance exactly equal to the width of the blocks. After the second block has made its impression the third comes into play in precisely the same way, so that as the cloth leaves the machines it's fully printed in three separate colours, each fitting into its proper place and completing the pattern. If necessary the forward movement of the cloth can be arrested without in any way interfering with the motion of the block, an arrangement which allows any insufficiently printed impression to be repeated in exactly the same place with a precision practically impossible in hand printing.

== Advantages ==
For certain classes of work the perrotine possesses great advantages over the hand-block; for not only is the rate of production greatly increased, but the joining up of the various impressions to each other is much more exacting; in fact, as a rule, no sign of a break in continuity of line can be noticed in well-executed work. On the other hand, however, the perrotine can only be applied to the production of patterns containing not more than three colours nor exceeding five inches in vertical repeat, whereas hand block printing can cope with patterns of almost any scale and continuing any number of colours. The perrotine is best for work of a utilitarian character and the hand-block for decorative work in which the design only repeats every 15 to 20 in. and contains colours varying in number from one to a dozen.

== See also ==
- Rogan painting
- Discharge printing
