= Stripping (textiles) =

Color removal technique in textiles

In textile processing, stripping is a color removal technique employed to partially or completely eliminate color from dyed textile materials. Textile dyeing industries often face challenges like uneven or flawed dyeing and the appearance of color patches on the fabric's surface during the dyeing process and subsequent textile material processing stages. Stripping is one of the reprocessing methods used to correct undesirable colors and flaws in dyed materials. The efficacy of this process relies on factors such as the dye type, fiber material, and the stripping agents utilized. Additionally, the procedure is recognized by alternative terms, namely back stripping or destructive stripping.

== Right first time ==
Right-first-time production in textiles entails achieving correctness on the initial dyeing attempt, resulting in a reduced need for stripping, rework, or redyeing.

Stripping is a method of reprocessing employed in the textile industry, wherein the removal of color from fabric becomes essential during the dyeing process. This approach can be employed to rectify any complications encountered during the dyeing process or to alter the color of surplus fabric for subsequent utilization. The stripping process is as complicated as dyeing and requires the greatest care of multiple factors such as dye type, material, reducing agent, cost, etc. When it comes to removing dye from fabric, it is important to distinguish between back stripping and destructive stripping.

== Types ==
=== Back stripping ===
Back stripping is a technique employed in the textile industry for the purpose of partial dye removal from fabrics. This method entails the selective extraction or displacement of dye molecules from the textile substrate without causing significant damage to the fabric itself. Back stripping only affects the depth of color. Back stripping primarily relies on the use of appropriate chemicals, solvents, or detergents, often in conjunction with controlled temperature and pH conditions. The objective is to reverse or weaken the chemical bonds that hold the dye molecules to the textile fibers, allowing them to be lifted or washed away. For an example by applying salt and alkali treatment at a temperature of 95 degrees Celsius, a reduction in dye of 20–40% can be achieved in reactive dyed materials. This occurs due to the hydrolysis of the dye fiber bond. This process is generally less aggressive and aims to color correction.

=== Destructive stripping ===
Destructive stripping, on the other hand, represents a more aggressive approach to dye removal from fabrics. This method involves the use of harsh chemicals, strong acids. The primary objective of destructive stripping is to eliminate the dye molecules. This technique may be employed when the complete removal of the dye takes precedence. Destructive stripping is commonly used where the fabric is to be completely re-dyed. In case of destructive stripping, for example, dyes with an azo group (N=N-) can be chemically reduced to an amine molecule that is almost colorless by using chemical reducing agents. The approach to comprehensive chemical stripping can differ based on the specific dyes applied. There are several methods for carrying out destructive stripping, which can involve reduction alone, oxidation alone, or a combination of both. Another option is to carry out reduction followed by oxidation or oxidation followed by reduction treatment.

==== Dyes ====
Direct dyes are removed by either boiling the fabric in alkaline sodium hydrosulfite, bleaching the fabric with sodium hypochlorite, or boiling the fabric with 1–2% sodium chlorite adjusted to a pH of 3 to 4 using formic or acetic acid.

Reactive dyes constitute a significant category of colorants employed in the dyeing process of cellulosic substances like cotton and viscose. Over 80% of the dyes employed in the dyeing of cellulosic materials are reactive dyes. These dyes, as suggested by their name, possess an inherent capacity to chemically react with the hydroxyl groups present in cellulosic materials, resulting in the formation of covalent bonds. Consequently, this chemical reaction imparts excellent fastness properties to the dyed materials.

Vat dyes exhibit resistance to elimination when subjected to reducing chemicals.

To remove certain azoic combinations, 1 gram of Hydrosulfite and 6 cubic centimeters of caustic soda 77TW [a 32% solution of Sodium Hydroxide] is recommended.

===== Other factors =====
Color removal from hydrophilic fibers, which interact well with water, is usually uncomplicated and relies on dyestuff chemistry. Water-soluble agents that react in water often perform the color removal, making the process easy. Dealing with hydrophobic fibers that repel water is more difficult for dyers. They encounter challenges in getting the stripping agent and dyestuff to react in the same environment and must navigate chemical intricacies.

== Stripping agents ==
There are various hydrosulfite compounds that can be used for stripping purposes.

The main ones, excluding sodium hydrosulfite, are:

- Zinc Formosul (Br) or Decroline (TG) is an insoluble basic zinc sulphoxylate-formaldehyde.
- Formosul (Br) or Rongalite C (IG) is a water-soluble sodium sulphoxylate-formaldehyde.
- Redusol Z (Br) or Decroline Soluble Conc. (IG) is a water-soluble neutral zinc sulphoxylate-formaldehyde.

=== Ozone ===
Stripping reactive dyes with ozone is an alternative technique that replaces traditional chemicals, offering a more ecologically sound approach. The resulting wastewater from the ozone stripping process demonstrates a significantly diminished chemical oxygen demand—approximately 97% lower than the effluent produced by conventional stripping methods. The findings of the research study titled 'Application of Ozone in Stripping of Cotton Fabric Dyed with Reactive Dyes' suggest that optimal conditions for color stripping through the ozone method for reactive dyes involve an ozone dose of 10 g/h, an exposure time of 45 minutes, and maintaining a pH level of 5.

=== Biochemicals ===
The stripping of certain reactive dyes, such as Black B, can be achieved using five indigenous strains of white rot fungi (WRF), particularly Ganoderma lucidum, in Kirk's basal salts medium.

== Advantages ==
Textile manufacturers frequently grapple with the challenge of uneven and inadequate dye distribution, which adversely affects the final quality of fabrics. This issue arises from a multitude of underlying factors. Stripping can serve as a reprocessing method aimed at rectifying flawed dyeing.

Color removal is utilized to recover and efficiently utilize discarded materials. The process of stripping color from textile materials serves multiple purposes. It is used to correct uneven and unsuitable dyeing of fibers, yarns, and fabrics. Additionally, it is employed to change the color of dyed textiles to a more desired shade, thereby increasing their marketability.

=== Textile recycling ===
The fashion industry exerts a substantial environmental footprint, primarily attributed to the heightened production of textile waste stemming from the proliferation of fast fashion business models. The textile industry, faced with its ever-expanding environmental footprint, is urgently seeking sustainable technologies. It is actively pursuing chemical-based recycling solutions tailored for all primary fiber types, including cellulosic materials like cotton, as well as synthetics such as polyester and nylon.

Completely removing color is a crucial step in the chemical-based recycling process of dyed textile waste. In the realm of textile color removal, two primary methods prevail: dye-destruction and dye-extraction. Yet, both approaches have struggled to achieve sustainable and thorough color removal while preserving the integrity of the polymers involved. Processes like oxidation and photodegradation, which fall under dye-destruction, often result in polymer damage and can lead to changes in the dyeability of regenerated fibers. While dye-extraction is a frequently employed technique in forensic science, it falls short of achieving complete color removal from textiles.

=== Disadvantages ===
Stripping is a technique that can potentially lead to a reduction in the strength of the treated materials. Moreover, it exerts a notable influence on production expenses and gives rise to certain environmental and health considerations.
