= Tie-dye =

Technique of resist dyeing

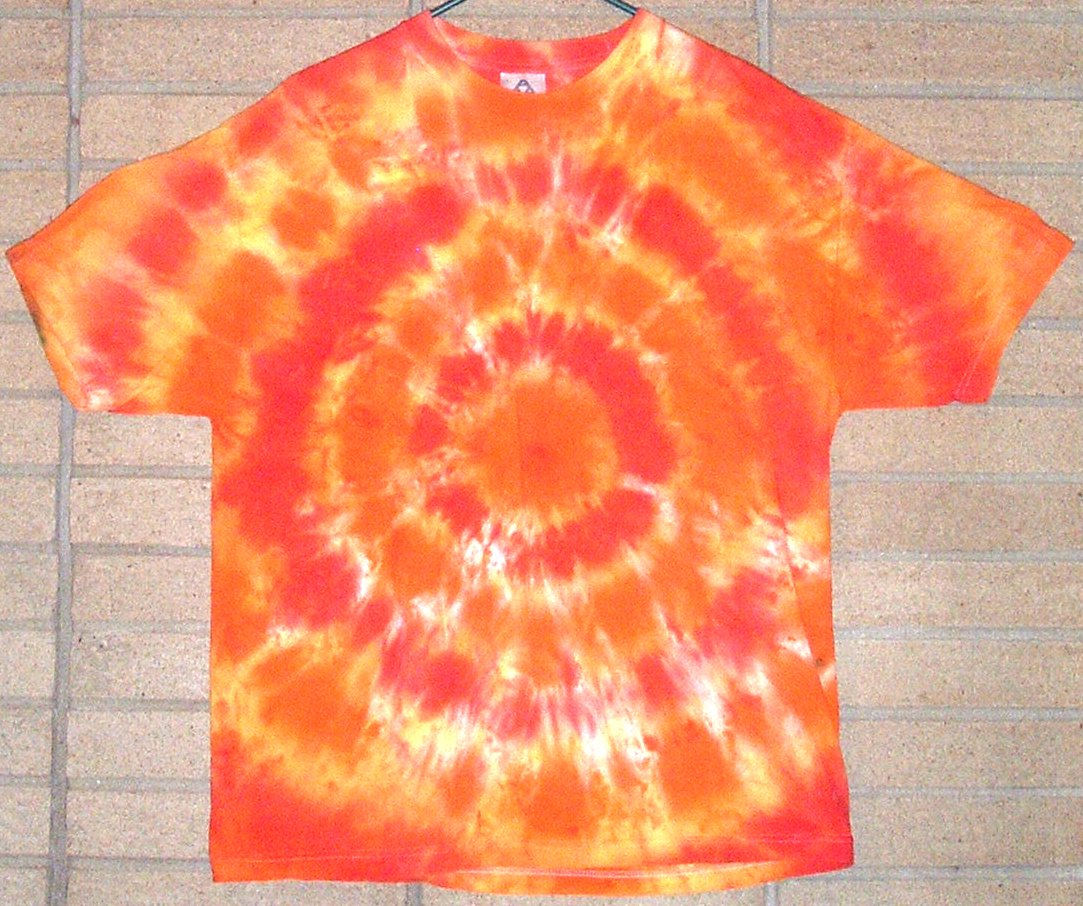
An example of a tie-dyed T-shirt

A video about how to tie-dye

Tie-dye is a term used to describe a number of resist dyeing techniques and the resulting dyed products of these processes. The process of tie-dye typically consists of folding, twisting, pleating, or crumpling fabric or a garment, before binding with string or rubber bands, followed by the application of dye or dyes. The manipulations of the fabric before the application of dye are called resists, as they partially or completely prevent ('resist') the applied dye from coloring the fabric. More sophisticated tie-dye may involve additional steps, including an initial application of dye before the resist, multiple sequential dyeing and resist steps, and the use of other types of resists (stitching, stencils) and discharge.

Unlike regular resist-dyeing techniques, modern tie-dye is characterized by the use of bright, saturated primary colors and bold patterns. These patterns, including the spiral, mandala, and peace sign, and the use of multiple bold colors, have become widely recognized as symbols of the 1960s and 1970s counterculture movement. However, tie-dye wasn't as pronounced in fashion even among the counterculture as it would be in later years and the present day. The vast majority of tie-dye garments and objects produced for wholesale distribution use these designs, with many being mass-produced.

In the 21st century, a revived interest in more "sophisticated" tie-dye techniques emerged in the fashion and hobby industry, characterized by simple motifs, monochromatic color schemes, a focus on fashionable garments and fabrics other than cotton, and the pursuit of tie-dye as an art form, rather than a commodity.

== Dyes, fabrics, and discharge agents ==
A variety of dyes are used in tie-dyeing, including household, fiber reactive, acid, and vat dyes. Most early (1960s) tie-dyes were made with retail household dyes, particularly those made by Rit. These dyes were designed for use on a number of different fibre types, and consisted of several different dyes, making them less effective and less colourfast than purely fiber-reactive dyes.

Most tie-dyes are now dyed with fiber-reactive dyes, a class of dyes effective on cellulose fibers such as cotton, hemp, rayon, and linen. This class of dyes reacts with fibers at alkaline (high) pH, forming a wash-fast, permanent bond. Soda ash (sodium carbonate) is the most common agent used to raise the pH and initiate the reaction, and is either added directly to the dye or in a solution of water in which garments are soaked before dyeing. Fiber-reactives dyes are relatively safe and simple to use, and are the same dyes used commercially to color cellulosic fabrics.

Protein-based fibers such as silk, wool, and feathers, as well as the synthetic polyamide fiber nylon, can be dyed with acid dyes. Acid dyes are effective at acidic (low) pH, where they form ionic bonds with the fiber. Acid dyes are also relatively safe (some are used as food dyes) and simple to use. Vat dyes, including indigo, are a third class of dyes that are effective on cellulose fibers and silk. Vat dyes are insoluble in water in their unreduced form, and must be chemically reduced before they can be used to color fabric. This is accomplished by heating the dye in a strongly basic solution of sodium hydroxide (lye) or sodium carbonate (caustic potash) containing a reducing agent such as sodium hydrosulfite or thiourea dioxide. The fabric is immersed in the dye bath, and after removal, the dye oxidizes to its insoluble form, binding with high wash-fastness to the fiber. However, vat dyes, and especially indigo, must be treated after dyeing by 'soaping' to prevent the dye from rubbing (crocking) off. Vat dyes can be used to simultaneously dye the fabric and to remove underlying fiber-reactive dye (i.e., can dye a black cotton fabric yellow) because of the bleaching action of the reducing bath. The extra complexity and safety issues (particularly when using strong bases such as lye) restrict the use of vat dyes in tie-dye to experts.

Discharge agents are used to bleach color from the previously dyed fabrics and can be used as a reverse tie-dye, where the application of the agent results in loss of color rather than its application. Household bleach (sodium hypochlorite) can be used to discharge fiber-reactive dyes on bleach-resistant fibers such as cotton or hemp, but not on wool or silk, though the results are variable, as some fiber-reactive dyes are more resistant to bleach than others. It is important to bleach as long as required to obtain the desired shade (which will be lighter than observed on wet, unwashed fabric), and to neutralize the bleach with agents such as sodium bisulfite, to prevent damage to the fibers. Thiourea dioxide is another commonly used discharge agent that can be used on cotton, wool, or silk. A thiourea dioxide discharge bath is made with hot water made mildly basic with sodium carbonate. The results of thiourea dioxide discharge differ significantly from bleach discharge due to the nature of the reaction. Since thiourea dioxide only bleaches in the absence of oxygen, and the fabric to be bleached retains oxygen, a fractal pattern of bleaching will be observed. This is in distinct contrast with household bleach discharge, where the bleaching agent penetrates fabric easily (particularly in bleach formulations containing detergent). For example, pleating fabric multiple times and clamping on a resist will yield a clear design after outlining the resist with household bleach, but discharge with reducing agents will only partially penetrate the resisted area.

In general, discharge techniques, particularly using household bleach, are a readily accessible way to tie-dye without the use of often messy and relatively expensive dyes. It is particularly easy to put a design on cloth using stencils and sprayed-on solutions of household bleach, but the intricate and unintended results of discharge using reducing agents often surpass the results of oxidizing discharge techniques.

== Designs and patterns ==
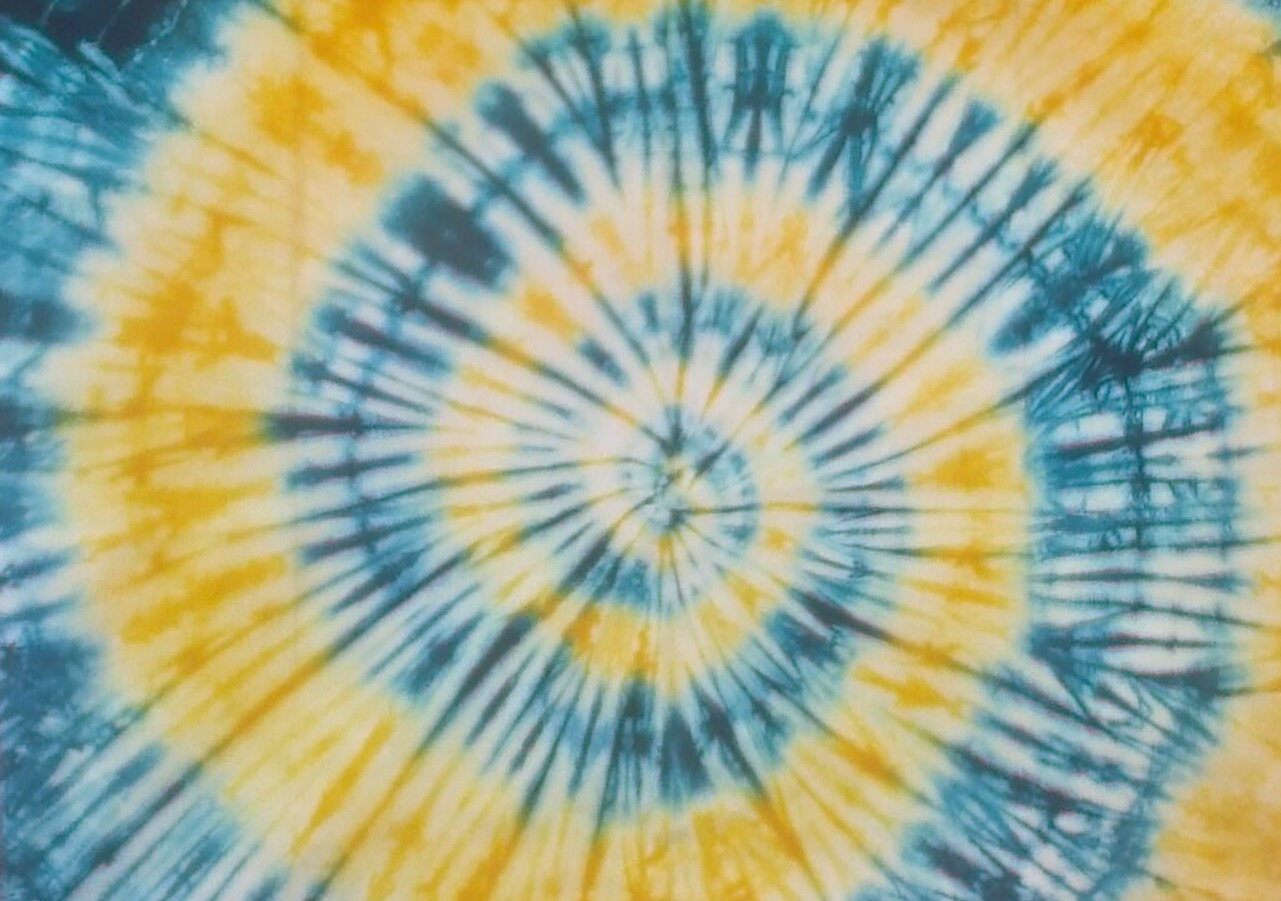
A tie-dyed spiral pattern

Tie-dye can be used to create a wide variety of designs on fabric, from standard patterns such as the spiral, peace sign, diamond, sunburst, and the marble effect to beautiful works of art. Using techniques such as stencils (as in screen printing using dyes or discharge pastes), clamped-on shaped blocks, and tritik (stitching and gathering), tie-dye can produce almost any design desired. If a modern kit is used, then it is easier to accomplish a spiral or circle.

== History ==
=== Earliest examples ===
The earliest examples of tie-dye in the Far East are from Sui dynasty (5th century AD) China.

The earliest surviving examples of pre-Columbian tie-dye in Peru date from 500 to 810 AD. Their designs include small circles and lines, with bright colors including red, yellow, blue, and green.

=== Asia ===
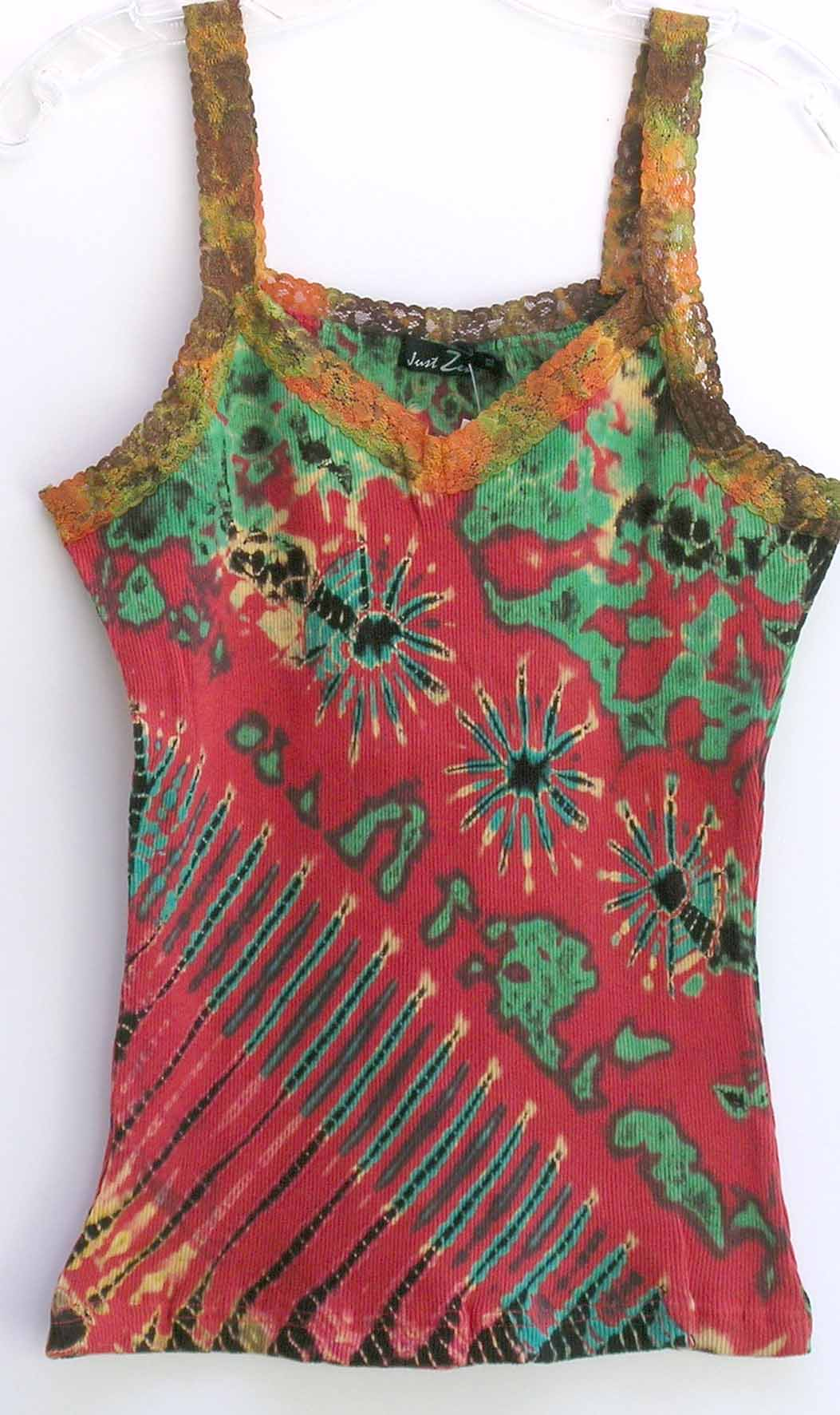
Example of Mudmee tie-dye, an art form originating in Thailand

Shibori is a form of tie-dye which originated in Japan, and has been practiced there since the 8th century. Shibori includes several labor-intensive resist techniques which include stitching elaborate patterns and tightly gathering the stitching before dyeing, forming intricate designs for kimono, obi and other accessories and garments. Another shibori method is to wrap the fabric around a core of rope, wood, or other material, and bind it tightly with string or thread. The areas of the fabric that are against the core or under the binding would remain undyed.

In Indonesia, especially in Java, tie-dye is known as jumputan. Other terms including plangi and tritik are Indonesian terms derived from Javanese words for methods related to tie-dye. In Indonesia, tie-dye might be combined with other dyeing techniques, such as batik jumputan, which combine tie-dye with batik wax-resist dyeing. Ikat is a method of tie-dyeing the warp or weft before the cloth is woven.

Bandhani is an Indian form of tie-dye that originated in western India.

Mudmee tie-dye originates in Thailand and the neighboring part of Laos. It uses different shapes and colors from other types of tie-dye, and the colors are, in general, more subdued. Another difference is that the base color is black.

In the 1941 book, Orphans of the Pacific, about the Philippines, it was noted: "There are a few thousand Bagobos, who wear highly decorated clothing made of hemp fiber, all tied-and-dyed into fancy designs, and who further ornament themselves with big metal disks."

In China, especially in Dali, Yunnan Province, a traditional form of tie-dye is practiced by the Dali Bai people, known as Dali Bai nationality tie-dye (大理白族扎染).

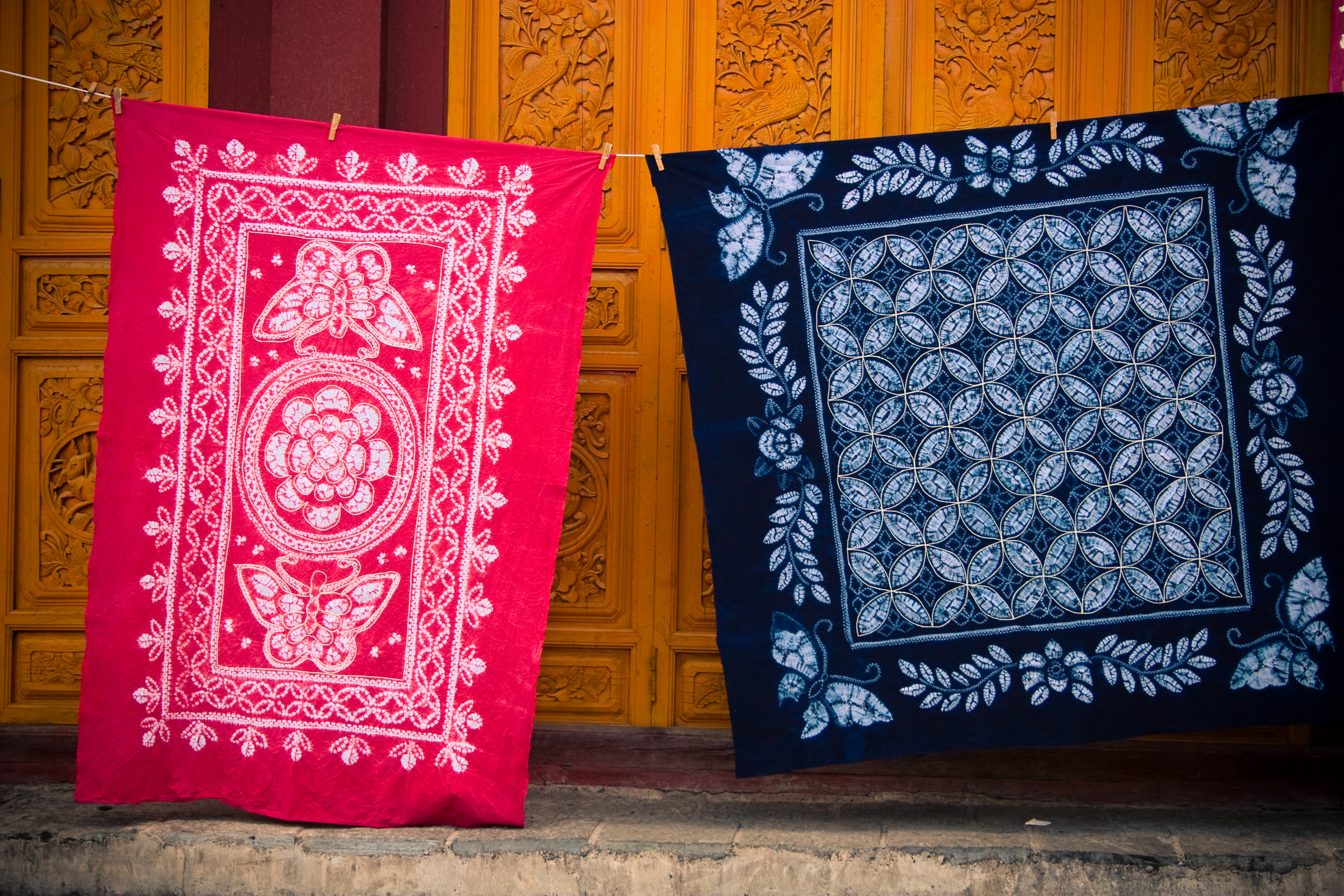
Traditional Dali Bai tie-dye

=== Africa ===
Tie-dye techniques have also been used for centuries in the Hausa region of West Africa, with renowned indigo dye pits located in and around Kano, Nigeria. The tie-dyed clothing is then richly embroidered in traditional patterns. It has been suggested that these African techniques were the inspiration for the tie-dyed garments identified with hippie fashion.

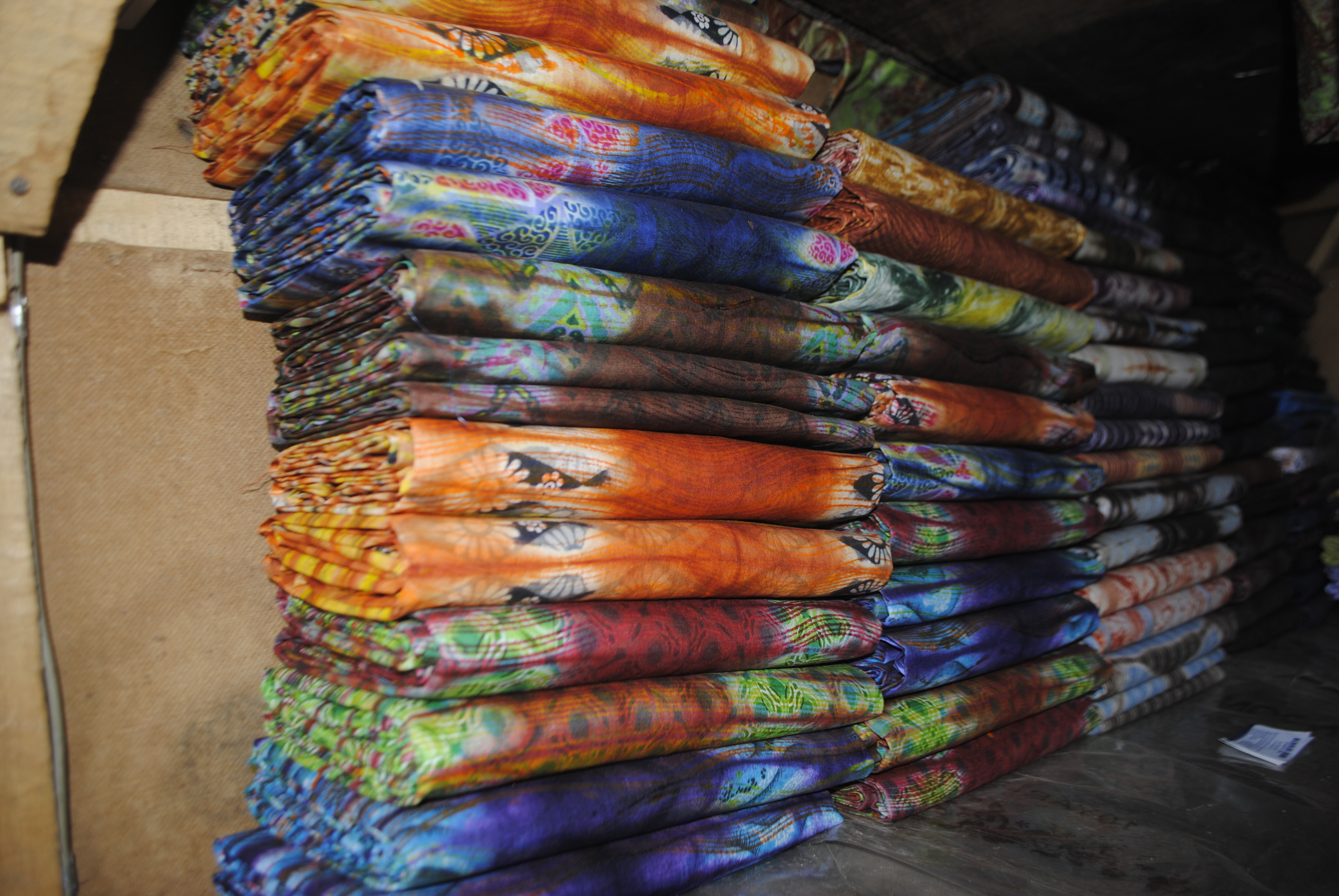
A stack of Adire, a textile of the Yoruba people

In southwestern Nigeria, the technique known as adire is produced, using a variety of resist-dyeing techniques.

=== Tie-dye in the Western world ===
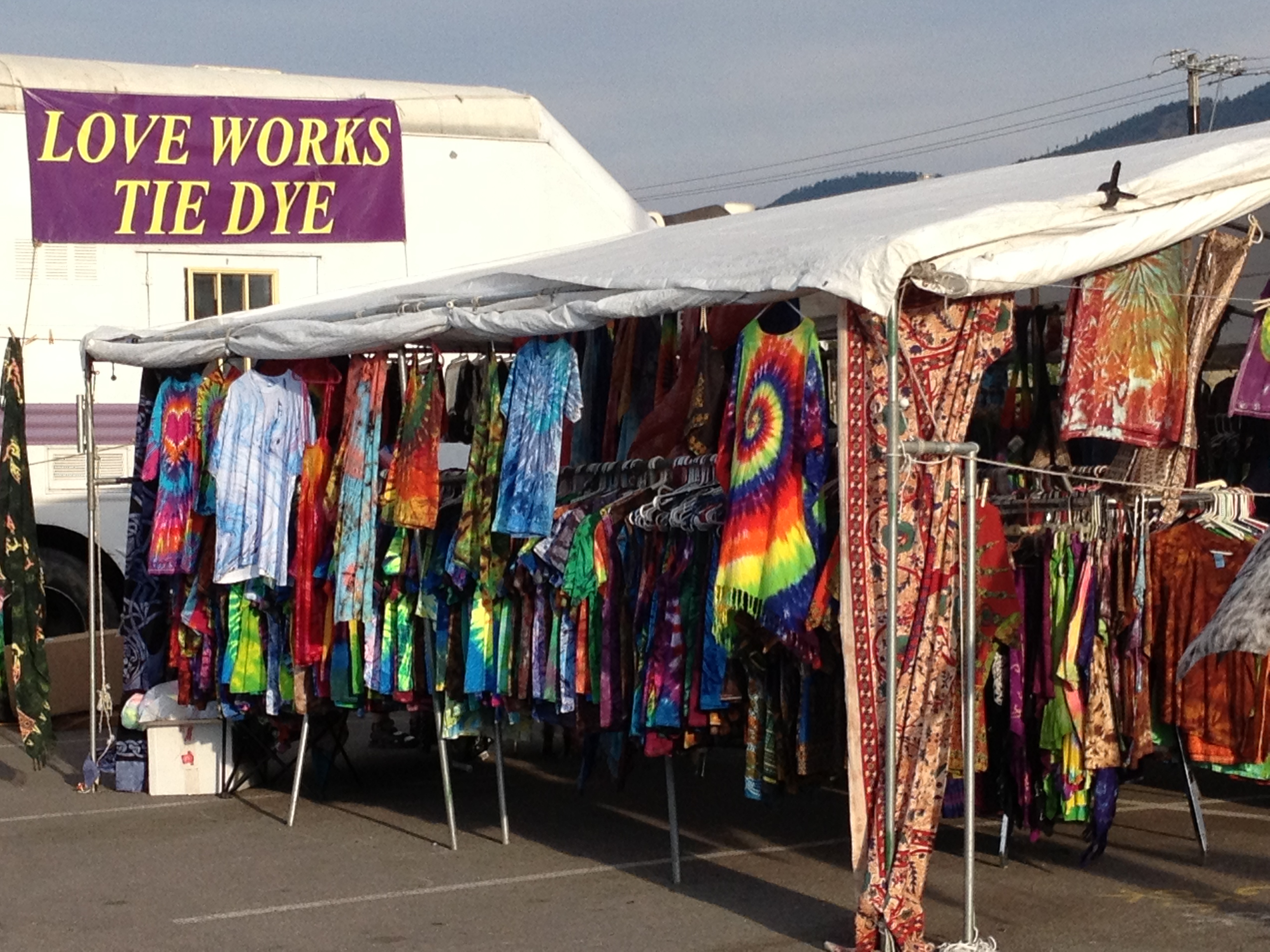
Tie dye vendor, July 2013

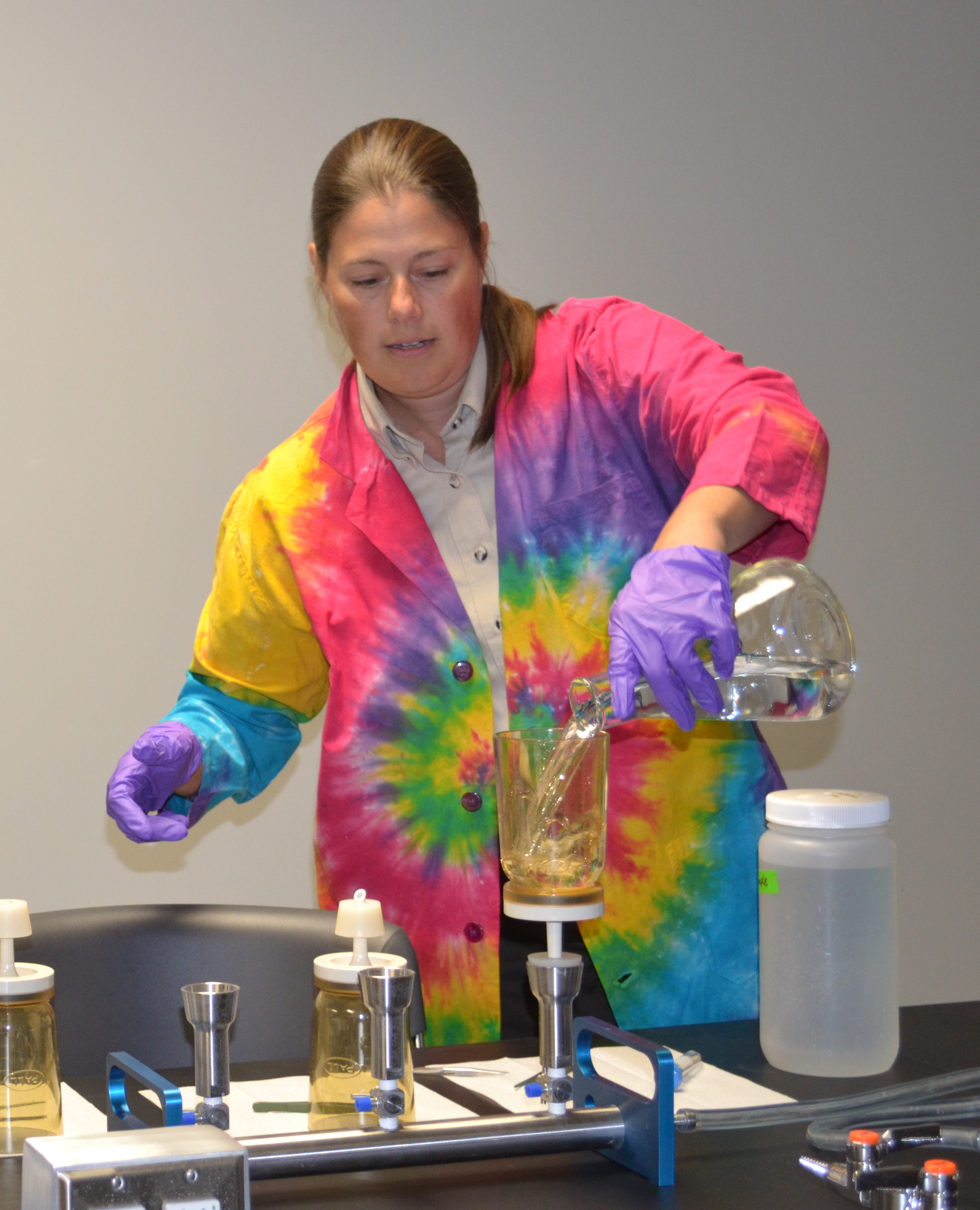
A tie-dyed lab coat

Tie-dyeing was known in the US by 1909, when Professor Charles E. Pellow of Columbia University acquired some samples of tie-dyed muslin and subsequently gave a lecture and live demonstration of the technique.

Although shibori and batik techniques were used occasionally in Western fashion before the 1960s, modern psychedelic tie-dyeing did not become a fad until the late 1960s following the example set by rock stars such as Janis Joplin and John Sebastian (who did his own dyeing). The 2011 film documentary Magic Trip, which shows amateur film footage taken during the 1964 cross-country bus journey of countercultural icon Ken Kesey and his Merry Pranksters, shows the travelers developing a form of tie-dye by taking LSD beside a pond and pouring enamel-based model airplane paint into it, before placing a white T-shirt upon the surface of the water. Although the process is closer to paper marbling, in the accompanying narrative, the travelers claim credit for inventing tie-dyeing.

Tie-dyeing, particularly after the introduction of affordable dyes, became popular as a cheap and accessible way to customize inexpensive T-shirts, singlets, dresses, jeans, army surplus clothing, and other garments into psychedelic creations. Some of the leading names in tie-dye at this time were Water Baby Dye Works (run by Ann Thomas and Maureen Mubeem), Bert Bliss, and Up Tied, the latter winning a Coty Award for "major creativity in fabrics" in 1970. Up Tied created tie-dyed velvets and silk chiffons which were used for exclusive one-of-a-kind garments by Halston, Donald Brooks, and Gayle Kirkpatrick, whilst another tie-dyer, Smooth Tooth Inc., dyed garments for Dior and Jonathan Logan. In late 1960s London, Gordon Deighton created tie-dyed shirts and trousers for young fashionable men which he sold through the Simpsons of Piccadilly department store in London.

== Verified Records ==
=== Longest Tie-Dye Cloth ===
- Record holder: Inez Harwood (United States)
- Length: 926.93 meters (3,041 feet 1.44 inches)
- Date achieved: 2013
- Recognized by: Guinness World Records

Inez Harwood created the world's longest tie-dye cloth as part of her "Vibrant Protest" project. The fabric, titled Liberty, was dyed using over 120 pounds (54 kg) of dye and 8,000 zip ties. The cloth was made from 100% U.S.-grown cotton and woven at Inman Mills in South Carolina. It aimed to raise awareness about the decline of the American textile industry.

=== Largest Gathering of People Wearing Tie-Dye ===
- Record holder: Frank Augustus Miller Middle School, Riverside, California
- Participants: 1,790
- Date achieved: 1 June 2017
- Recognized by: Guinness World Records

A school-organized event in California brought together 1,790 individuals wearing tie-dye simultaneously, setting a new world record.

=== Most Articles of Tie-Dye Clothing Worn at Once ===
- Record holder: Candice Matthews
- Number of items: 21
- Date achieved: 17 May 2015
- Event: Bay to Breakers road race, San Francisco
- Recognized by: RecordSetter

Candice Matthews wore 21 articles of tie-dye clothing simultaneously at the Bay to Breakers race in San Francisco. The record was verified by RecordSetter.

== Gallery ==
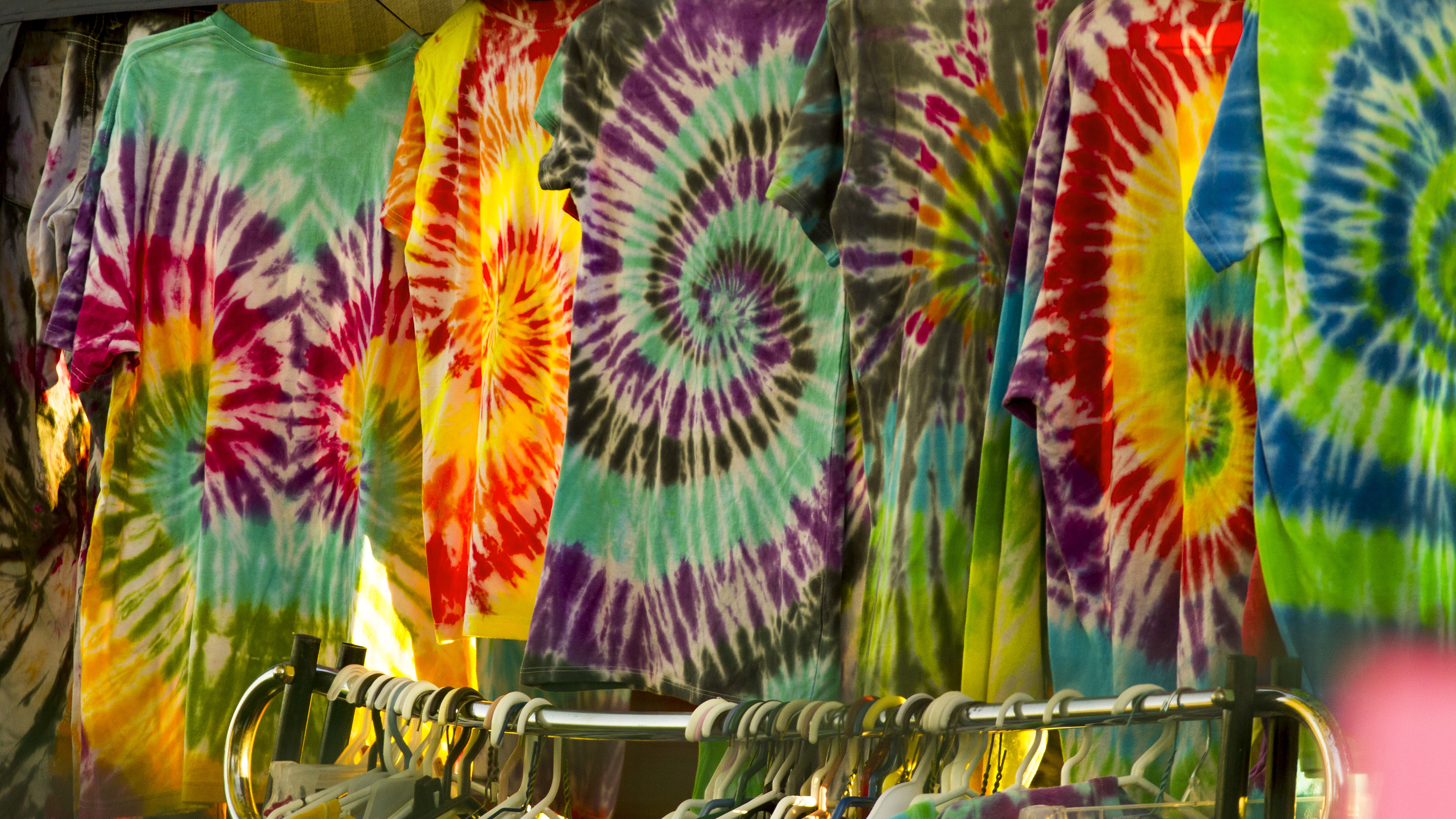
An assortment of tie-dye T-shirts

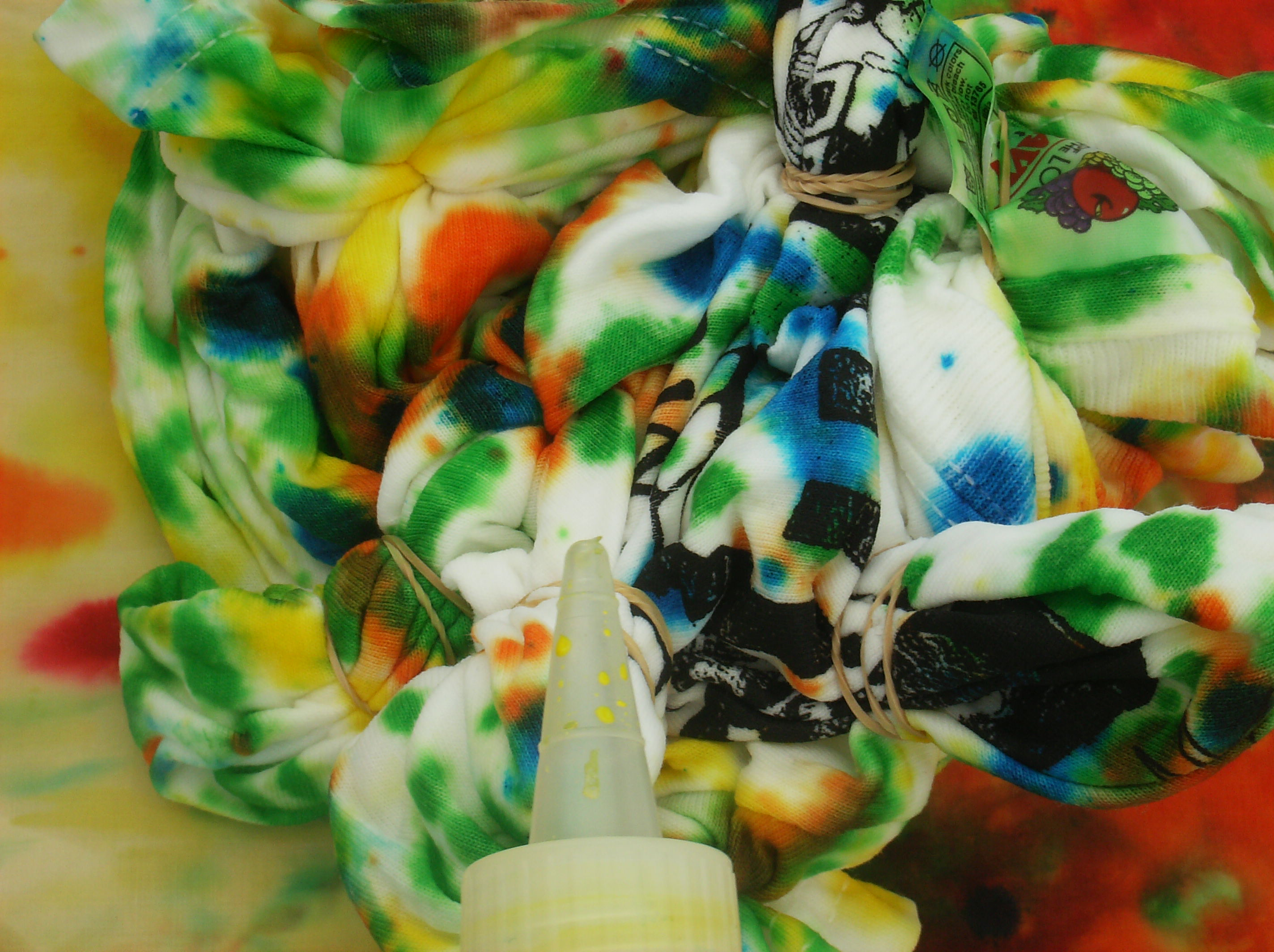
A T-shirt being tie-dyed

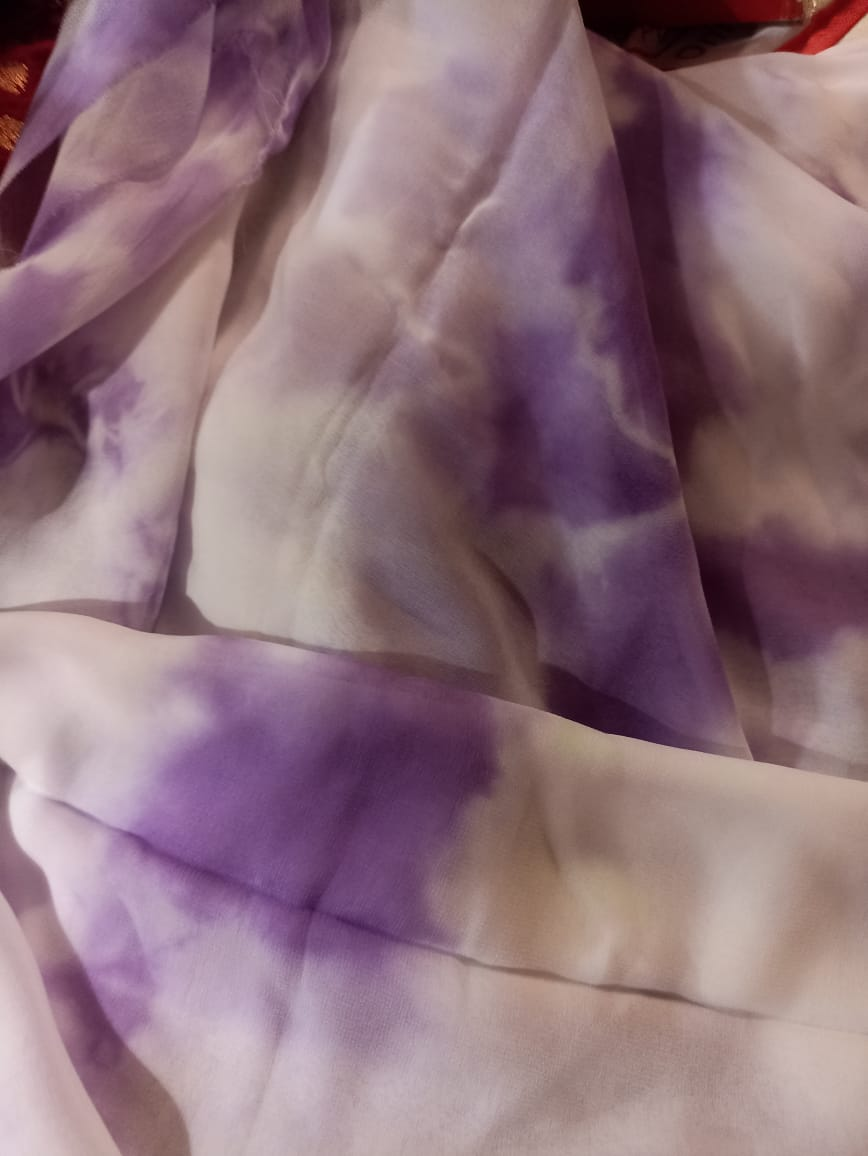
Purple tie-dye

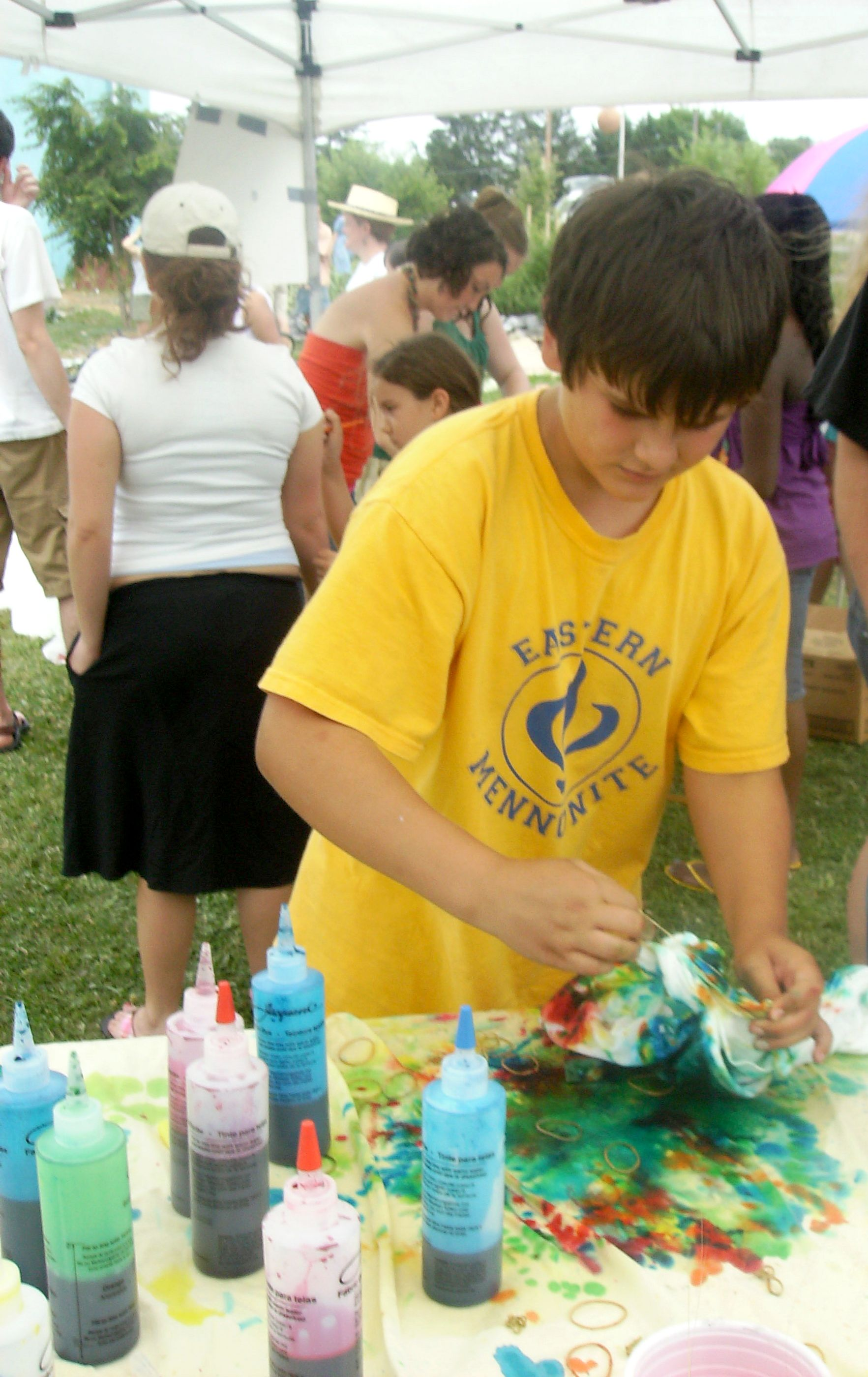
A child tie-dying a T-shirt

== See also ==
- Batik
- Psychedelic art
- Bagh prints
- Shibori
