= Digital textile printing =

Method of printing colorants onto fabric

Digital textile printing is described as any ink jet based method of printing colorants onto fabric. Most notably, digital textile printing is referred to when identifying either printing smaller designs onto garments (T-shirts, dresses, promotional wear; abbreviated as DTG, which stands for Direct to garment printing) and printing larger designs onto large format rolls of textile. The latter is a growing trend in visual communication, where advertisement and corporate branding is printed onto polyester media. Examples are: flags, banners, signs, retail graphics.

Types of printing can be divided into:

- Direct Print
- Discharge Print
- Resist Print
- Pigment Print
- Reactive Print
- Acid print
- Disperse print
- Specialty Print

Digital textile printing started in the late 1980s as a possible replacement for analog screen printing. With the development of a dye-sublimation printer in the early 1990s, it became possible to print with low energy sublimation inks and high energy disperse direct inks directly onto textile media, as opposed to print dye-sublimation inks on a transfer paper and, in a separate process using a heat press, transfer it to the fabric.

Within the digital textile printing for visual communication a division has to be made in:

- low-volume dye-sub printers ( e.g., ATPColor.it, Roland, D-Gen, Mimaki, Mutoh )
- mid-volume wide format printers ( e.g., Atexco, ATPColor.it, Roland, Durst, Hollanders Printing Systems, Vutek )
- high-volume industrial printers (e.g., KERAjet, Atexco, Reggiani, MS, Osiris, Stork (later SPGPrints), Konica-Minolta, Zimmer )

== Production requirements ==
The ‘textile market’ comprises many different applications and requirements. The intended use of the fabric is the most important starting point to identify exactly what's needed to produce a specific end-product. A ‘textile’ product may vary from natural yarns for garments, through to synthetic fibers for flags and banners. A textile product can be a wall mounted banner, a stand-alone pop-up banner, a beach flag, country flag or company flag. It can be a carpet, back-lit frame, curtain, room divider, building wrap, bed cover, a garment and much more.

The predominant textile media used in visual communication is a polyester based fabric. In the US, nylon is often used for flags. In northern Europe, polyspun material has been the choice of fabric for traditional flag printing. In today's market, a woven or knitted polyester is the de facto standard. This differs from the predominant coated vinyl or pvc media used in the sign and display industry. The production process needs to fit requirements for the type of ink: high energy sublimation (also known as disperse direct), low energy sublimation (dye-sub), acid, reactive and pigment. In turn, the type of ink chemistry needs to fit requirements for the media (such as polyester, nylon, cotton, silk). Based on the media and ink combination, the choice comes for infra-red fixation, heat-press sublimation or steaming. The structure of the fabric also needs attention, for example whether it is woven, non-woven or knitted.

Polyester fabric is printed mostly with dye-sub or disperse direct ink, although UV and solvent inks (including HP's latex formulation) can also be used. The great benefit of sublimation ink is the fact that the colorants will bond with the fibre during sublimation or fixation. The colours are ‘inside’ the media and don't stay within the coating and on top of the media, as it is the case with UV-curable formulations. Even latex inks on porous textiles can suffer from crocking issues or ‘rub-off’. Low energy sublimation ink is easier to print with, but has the disadvantage of colours fading faster; its UV resistance, or light-fastness, is less resistant than equivalents using high energy disperse direct ink. Dye-sub can also suffer from a ‘halo’ effect which results in less sharp images. The disperse direct ink is a ‘stronger’ ink than the dye-sub kind, and this is very important for outdoor use, such as for fence fabric, flags and banners: artwork will last longer.

Another benefit of aqueous-based sublimation ink is the absence of hazardous components as found in UV-curable, solvent and, even, in latex inks. When executed properly, direct to media printing with disperse ink is achievable on uncoated fabrics and offers maximum print-through; this is essential in applications viewed from both sides, such as with flag printing. As such, products can be sold at a higher margin, with a ‘green’ label and with a higher quality. Other media and ink combinations cannot allow this.

The biggest advantage of direct to media is drastically reduced waste. This method doesn't need printing on transfer paper first before calendering (or heat-pressing) it onto the media. Waste is both an economical and an ecological factor in print production. Print speed doesn't account for much if a large portion is being thrown away as waste due to incompatibility of media, ink, treatment or lack of know-how. Overall, digital textile printing offers a more sustainable option than traditional signage. Fabric made from recycled fibers contributes to lower environmental impact in display applications.

The qualities of the printed end product should fit the needs of the application. Longevity, fastness and hand properties are important. Post-processing is something to think about: is the printed material easily confectioned, applied or handled. Should it be washed or does it need a finish (e.g. fire retardant, water repellent). A washed textile no longer has coating or ink residues and will, therefore, have a better feel. Moreover, it will be less prone to stains and it will last longer. However, digital textile printing fabric will fade out with repeated washings, so it should be labeled as dry cleaning only, and the best way is washing by hand with cold water or using washing machine with gentle cycle and use mild detergent.

An alternative which does not require expensive equipment and dyes is Inkjet Fabric Printing which uses a standard inkjet printer (e.g. HP, Epson, Canon, Lexmark) and specially treated, paper-backed fabric sheets. Inkjet fabric sheets are currently available in cotton, bamboo and silk on Amazon and other websites. The removable paper backing makes the fabric stiff enough to go through your inkjet printer. Once the ink is dry (1 hour to overnight for heavy ink coverage), simply remove the paper backing, follow the directions for a water dip to set the ink, let the fabric dry, and you are ready to sew.

== Economics ==
As well as material concerns and application issues, economics come into play. Where the traditional textile print industry is accustomed to mass production with long-runs, the digital inkjet business mostly produces short-run non-textile products. This approach to digital textile printing is very different, and so is the expectation. Where sign-makers are familiar with a single process system, traditional textile printing is accustomed to several production steps. In the balance of the economics behind production needs, it is important to understand the entire production flow. An example lies with the choice of fixation equipment and the subsequent implication of energy and resource cost; for example, a steamer needs water and energy, and a calender needs to heat up and uses much energy and considerable amounts of paper.

Additionally, the impact on business by legislation and requests from customers with regard to environmentally friendly products, are increasingly becoming a factor.

== Growth ==
In 2015, the industry is valued at approximately US$7.5billion globally. The worldwide digital textile printing market for garment, home décor and industrial applications is experiencing strong growth of around 34% CAGR to 2019.
