= Chuni =

Chuni may refer to:

- North Caucasian Huns, mentioned by Dionysius Periegetes alongside the Suni and Unni (Uns).
- Chuni, Republic of Dagestan, a rural locality in Dagestan, Russia
- Chuni, Sichuan, a town in the Garzê Tibetan Autonomous Prefecture of Sichuan, China
- The Punjabi name of a Dupatta.
