= Leheriya =

Tie-dyeing technique of Rajasthan, India

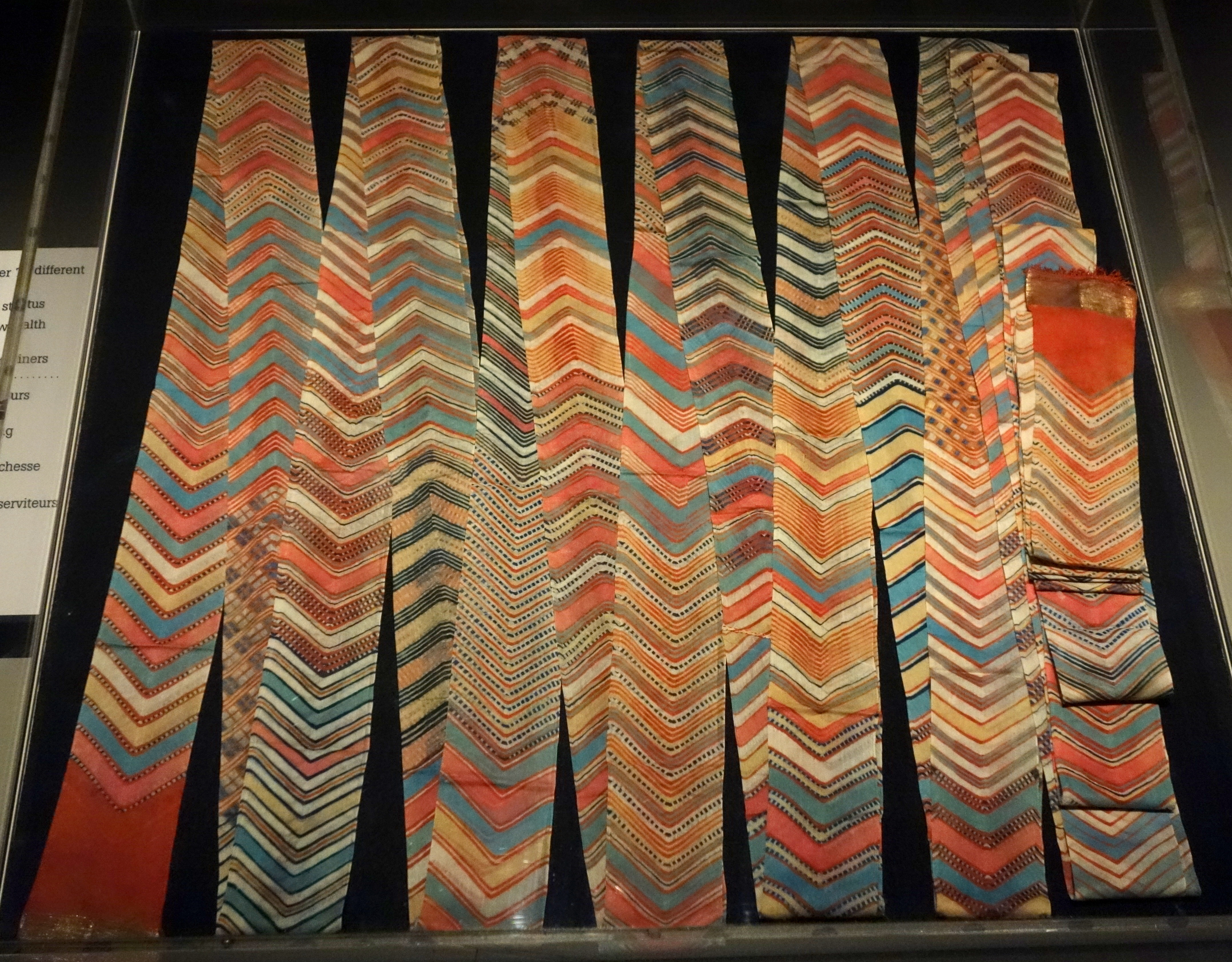
Leheriya craft on Rajasthani men's turban cloth. (Royal Ontario Museum, Canada)

Leheriya is a traditional style of textile tie dye from Rajasthan, India. Its designs are inspired by the natural wave(leher) patterns formed by the wind blowing across the desert sands of western Rajasthan. The craft is exclusive to Rajasthan, with its main centres being the cities of Jaipur and Jodhpur.

== Etymology ==
The word "leheriya" is derived from the Sanskrit word “lahara,” meaning “wave.”

== Technique ==
Leheria dyeing is done on thin cotton or silk cloth, usually in lengths appropriate for dupatta, turbans or saris. According to World Textiles: A Visual Guide to Traditional Techniques, the fabric is "rolled diagonally from one corner to the opposite selvedge, and then tied at the required intervals and dyed". Wave patterns result from fanlike folds made before dyeing. Traditional leheria employs natural dyes and multiple washes and uses indigo or alizarin during the final stage of preparation.

=== Mothara ===
An additional dyeing using the leheria technique produces mothara. In the making of mothara, the original resists are removed and the fabric is re-rolled and tied along the opposite diagonal. This results in a checkered pattern with small undyed areas occurring at regular intervals. The undyed areas are about the size of a lentil, hence the name mothara (moth means lentil in Hindi).

== Use ==
Leheria turbans were a standard part of male business attire in Rajasthan during the nineteenth and early twentieth centuries. Leheria is still produced in Jodhpur, Jaipur, Udaipur, and Nathdwara. It is offered for sale with most of its resist ties still in place as proof of authenticity, with a small portion of fabric unrolled to display its pattern.

Leheria occasionally appears in fashion collections, such as Designer Malini Ramani's beach collection in the Spring 2006 Delhi fashion show.

== See also ==
- Bandhani
- Shibori
- Sungudi
- Tie-dye
- Tritik
