= Lengqi =

- Town

Tibetan transcription(s)

Chinese transcription(s)
- Interactive map of Lengqi
- Country: China
- Province: Sichuan
- Prefecture: Garzê Tibetan Autonomous Prefecture
- Time zone: UTC+8 (CST)

Lengqi (Chinese: 冷碛镇; pinyin: Lěngqì Zhèn; Tibetan: ལིན་ཆིས་གྲོང་རྡལ།, Wylie: lin chis grong rdal) is a town in the Garzê Tibetan Autonomous Prefecture of Sichuan, China.

In 2019, Lengqi had a total population of 7,897.

On 23 December 2019, Chuni Township was merged into Lengqi.
