= Tritik =

Type of resist dyeing

Tritik, or stitch resist, is a resist dyeing technique in which a line of stitches is gathered tightly before dyeing, creating a negative design in the dyed fabric. It is similar to the Japanese resist technique shibori.

Traditionally two hand stitches are used for tritik: running stitch and whip stitch. Because the dye pattern is formed by stitching, it can be highly controlled, and needle holes that may remain in the fabric add to the visual interest of the piece.

Resist dyeing with tritik stitching is seen in many parts of the world including Southeast Asia, Africa, and South America.

== See also ==
- Bandhani
- Leheriya
- Shibori
- Sungudi
- Tie-dye
