= Shibori =

Japanese dyeing technique

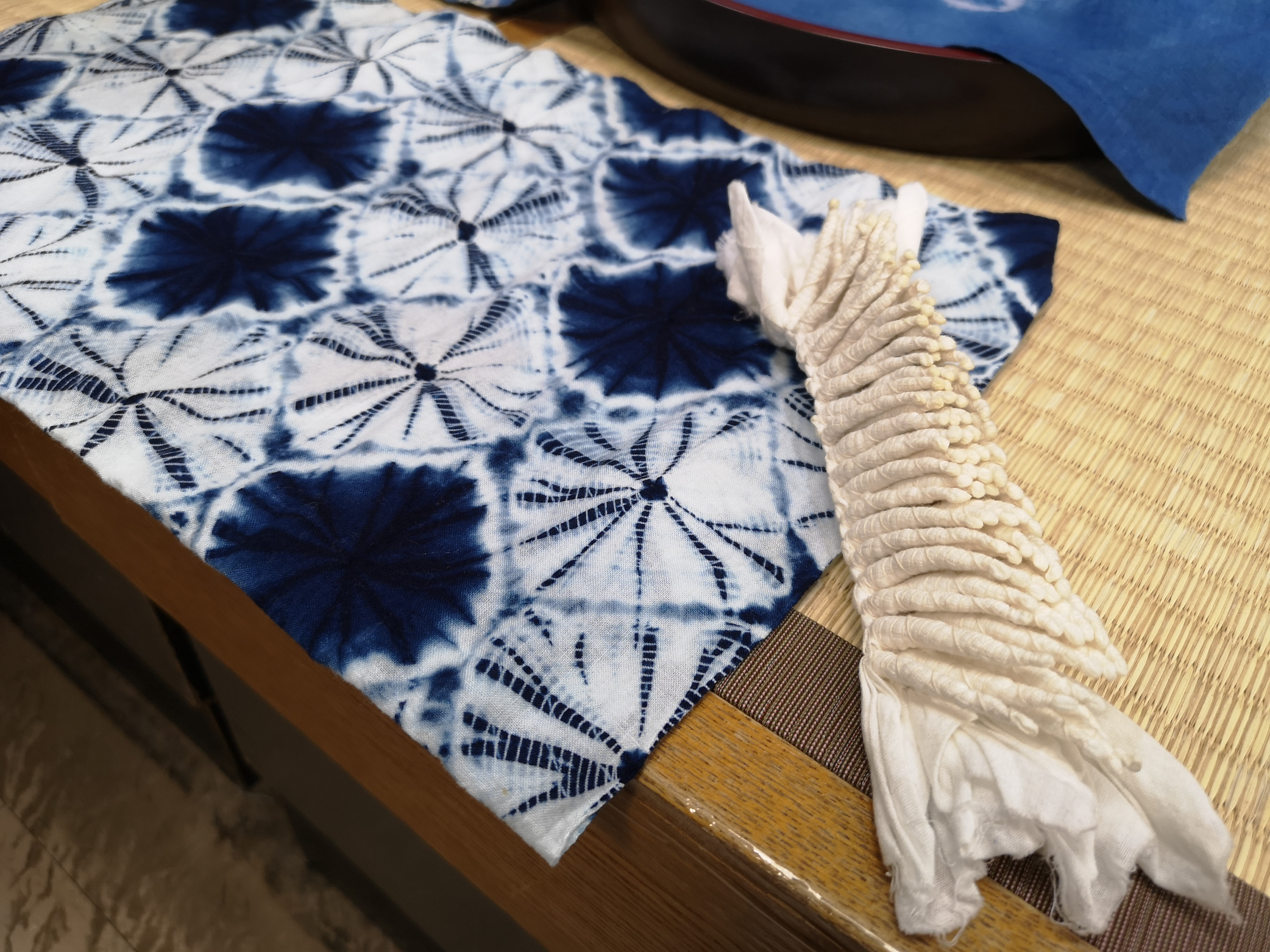
A section of kumo shibori (spider shibori) dyed with indigo, next to kumo shibori that has not been dyed yet

Shibori (しぼり/絞り, from the verb root shiboru – "to wring, squeeze or press") is a Japanese manual tie-dyeing technique, which produces a number of different patterns on fabric.

== History ==
Some discussion exists as to the origin of shibori as a technique within Japan, and indeed, the exact country of origin of some of the earliest surviving examples. Much of the debate surrounds the technical capacities within Japan at the time to produce the variety of fabrics seen in some of the earliest shibori examples.

One of the earliest written descriptions of shibori dates to 238 CE, where it was recorded in the Chinese document Treatise on the Wa People that Queen Himiko gifted the emperor of Cao Wei over 200 yards (180 m) of "spotted cloth" – potentially describing a form of wax-resist decoration on the fabric.

The earliest surviving examples of shibori-dyed cloth date back to the mid-8th century, donated to the Tōdai-ji Buddhist temple in Nara in 756 CE, as part of the goods donated by the Emperor Shōmu upon his death. The techniques seen on these earliest fragments show bound resists, wax resists and folded and clamped resists. However, at least some of the shibori-dyed fabric in this collection is Chinese in origin.

Surviving examples of resist-dyeing in China (known as jiaoxie 絞纈) date to a much earlier time period; the earliest surviving examples dating to 418 CE.

== Techniques ==
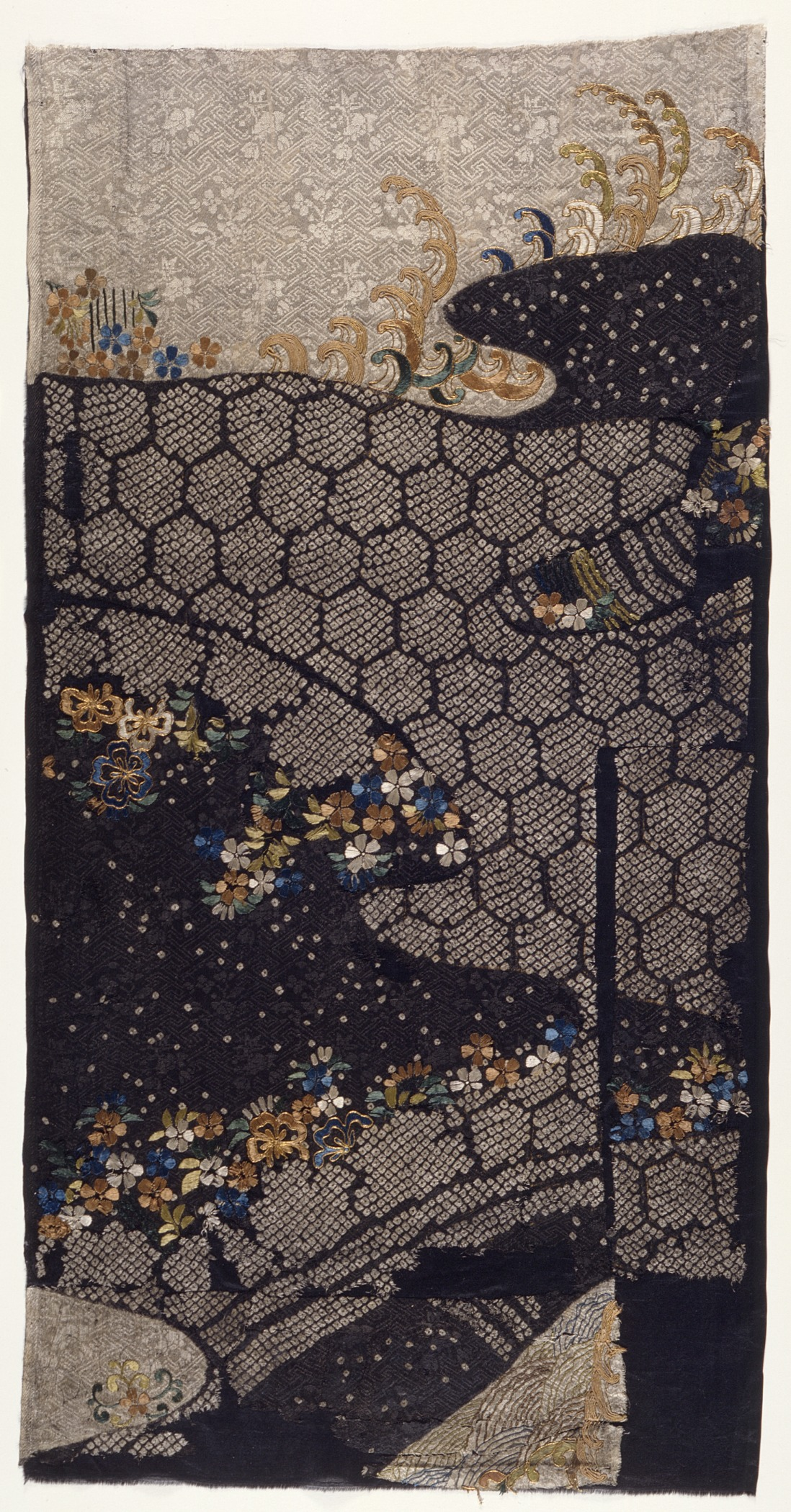
An example of shibori tied in small dots to form a tortoiseshell (kikko) design

There are many ways to create shibori, with techniques generally grouped into three categories: kōkechi, tied or bound resists; rōkechi, wax resists; and kyōkechi, resists where the fabric is folded and clamped between two carved wooden blocks. Most techniques recognised within these three categories have names and a number of varieties of technique.

The technique chosen and the resulting dyed fabric depends upon both the type of fabric and the dyestuff used; shibori demands a pliant and easy-to-handle fabric, with some historic dyeing techniques – such as the original technique of tsujigahana – now impossible to recreate entirely due to the fact that the fabric necessary for the technique is no longer produced.

The desired result for shibori may be to create a larger pictographic or geometric design (as seen on many full-shibori kimono), or simply to display the shibori on its own. Differing techniques may be combined in some cases to achieve increasingly more elaborate results.

=== Kanoko shibori ===
Kanoko shibori is what is commonly thought of in the West as tie-dye. Its name, meaning "fawn spots," is derived from the rings that it creates. It involves binding certain sections of the cloth using thread – traditionally a type of untwisted thread known as shike-ito – to achieve the desired pattern. The pattern achieved depends on how tightly the cloth is bound and where the cloth is bound. If random sections of the cloth are bound, the result will be a pattern of random circles. If the cloth is first folded then bound, the resulting circles will be in a pattern depending on the fold used.

=== Miura shibori ===
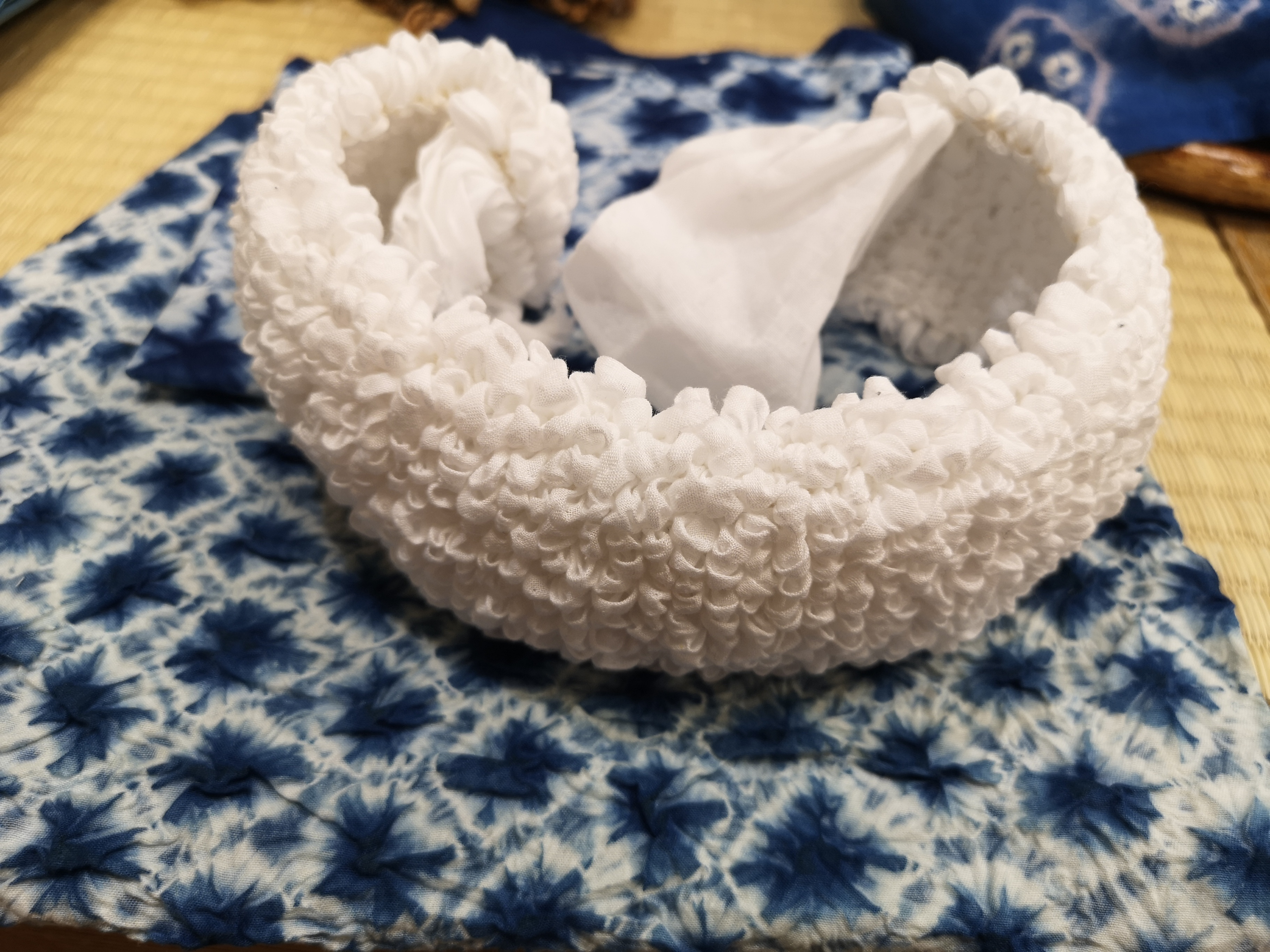
Miura shibori

Miura shibori is also known as looped binding. It involves taking a hooked needle and plucking sections of the cloth. Then a thread is looped around each section twice. The thread is not knotted; tension is the only thing that holds the sections in place. The resulting dyed cloth is a water-like design. Because no knot is used, miura shibori is very easy to bind and unbind, making this technique commonly used.

=== Kumo shibori ===
Kumo shibori (spider shibori) is a pleated and bound resist. This technique involves pleating sections of the cloth very finely and evenly. Then the cloth is bound in very close sections. The result is a very specific spider-like design. This specific design requires very precise technique.

=== Nui shibori ===
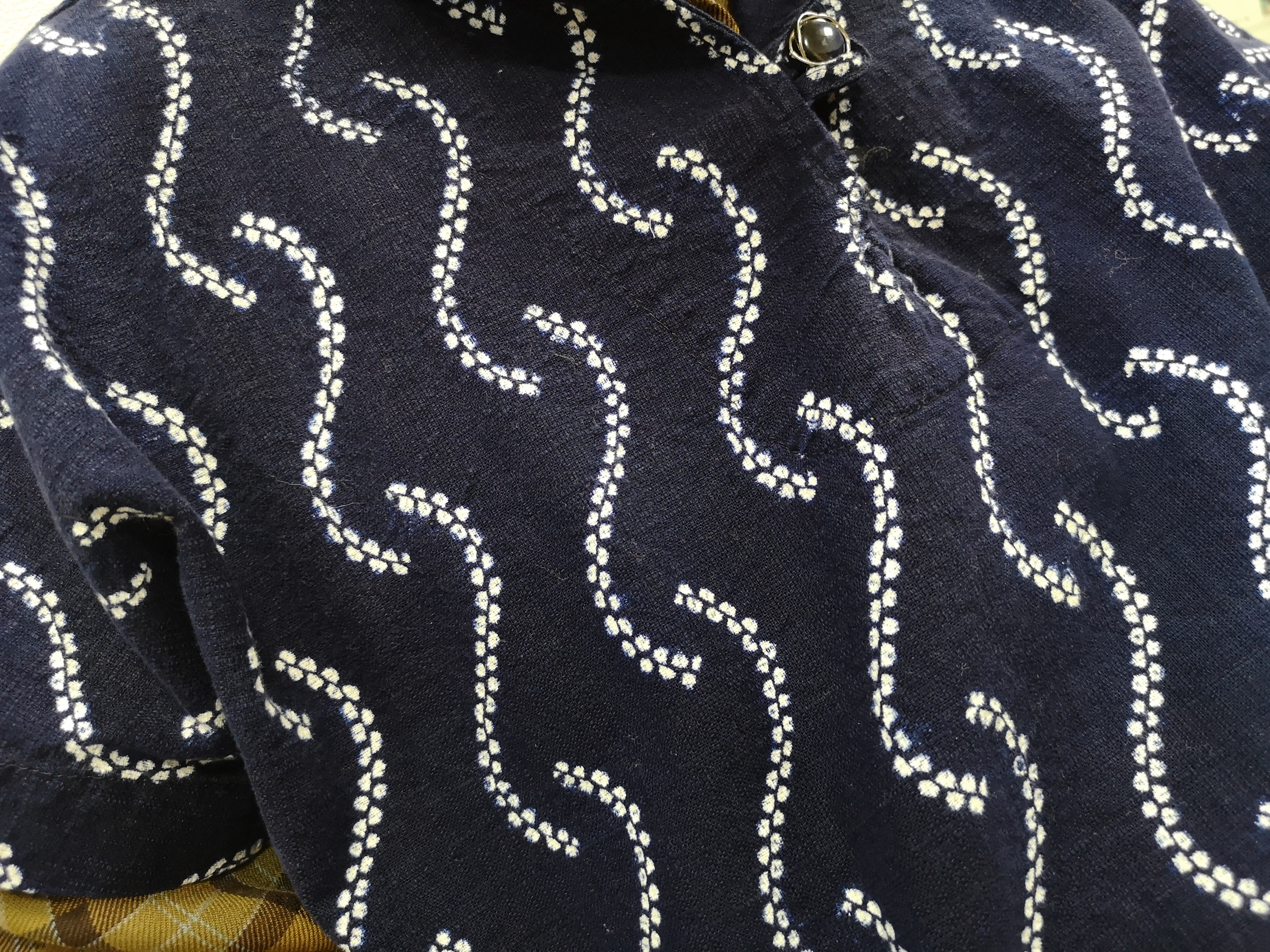
Ori nui shibori

Nui shibori includes stitched shibori. A simple running stitch is used on the cloth then pulled tight to gather the cloth. The thread must be pulled very tight to work, and a wooden dowel must often be used to pull it tight enough. Each thread is secured by knotting before being dyed. This technique allows for greater control of the pattern and greater variety of pattern, but it is much more time-consuming.

=== Arashi shibori ===
Arashi shibori is also known as pole-wrapping shibori. The cloth is wrapped on a diagonal around a pole. Then the cloth is very tightly bound by wrapping thread up and down the pole. Next, the cloth is scrunched on the pole. The result is a pleated cloth with a design on a diagonal. Arashi is the Japanese word for storm; the patterns are always on a diagonal in arashi shibori, which suggests the driving rain of a heavy storm.

=== Itajime shibori ===
Itajime shibori is a shaped-resist technique. Traditionally, the cloth is sandwiched between two pieces of wood, which are held in place with string. The fabric is typically folded more than once, creating a repeating pattern of resists throughout the fabric when unfolded.

One of the traditional forms of itajime shibori textiles is beni itajime (lit. 'beni (red safflower) squeezed board shibori'), also known as beni ita or Kyo beni. Beni itajime textiles were lining-weight fabrics dyed with pictorial patterns using red safflower (beni) dye, (Note: Though safflower dye was used, records from the Yoshimura dyeworks in Takasaki, Gunma Prefecture show that during the late Edo period (around 1845), the dye was diluted and substituted by craftsmen with sappan dye (Caesalpinia sappan L.) and turmeric (Curcuma longa L.).) and were used for underlayers or linings as recently as the early Shōwa period (1926–1989), with production centred around Kyoto and Takasaki, Gunma Prefecture, a city known for the production of fine, lightweight silks.

The last beni itajime dyeworks, the Yoshimura dyeworks of Takasaki, closed in 1932, and the technique of dyeing was relatively unknown until investigation into it was undertaken in 2010 by Yoshiko Iwamoto Wada and Masanao Arai, with the assistance of the Yoshimura dyeworks archive and the Takasaki-Beni-no-Kai research group. The research discovered that the boards used in the beni itajime process were lacquered on all but the sides and centre to resist the dye, and were soaked in water for 2 weeks before dyeing, as dry boards would warp and distort the resist. The low-quality, slightly coarse texture of the silk traditionally used in the process was important to the takeup of the dye and the ability to layer the fabric within the dye process, as the fabric would be folded eight times, with the ideal fabric weighing no more than 100 g (3.5 oz) per 23 cm × 38 cm (9.1 in × 15.0 in) piece. The fabric was folded using the maki tatami technique, before a thin starch paste was applied to the faces of the boards to aid in the adhesion of the silk to its surface. The block was clamped tightly and hot dye was poured over the dye block – whilst rotating it to bathe every side in the dye – for three hours. This resulted in a perfect recreation of the crisp red-and-white pictorial designs of older beni itajime fabrics.

Modern textile artists, instead of using carved or uncarved wooden boards painted with lacquer, often use shapes cut from acrylic or plexiglass and holding the shapes with C-clamps. The shapes prevent the dye from penetrating the fabric they cover.

== Gallery ==
Differing examples of shibori
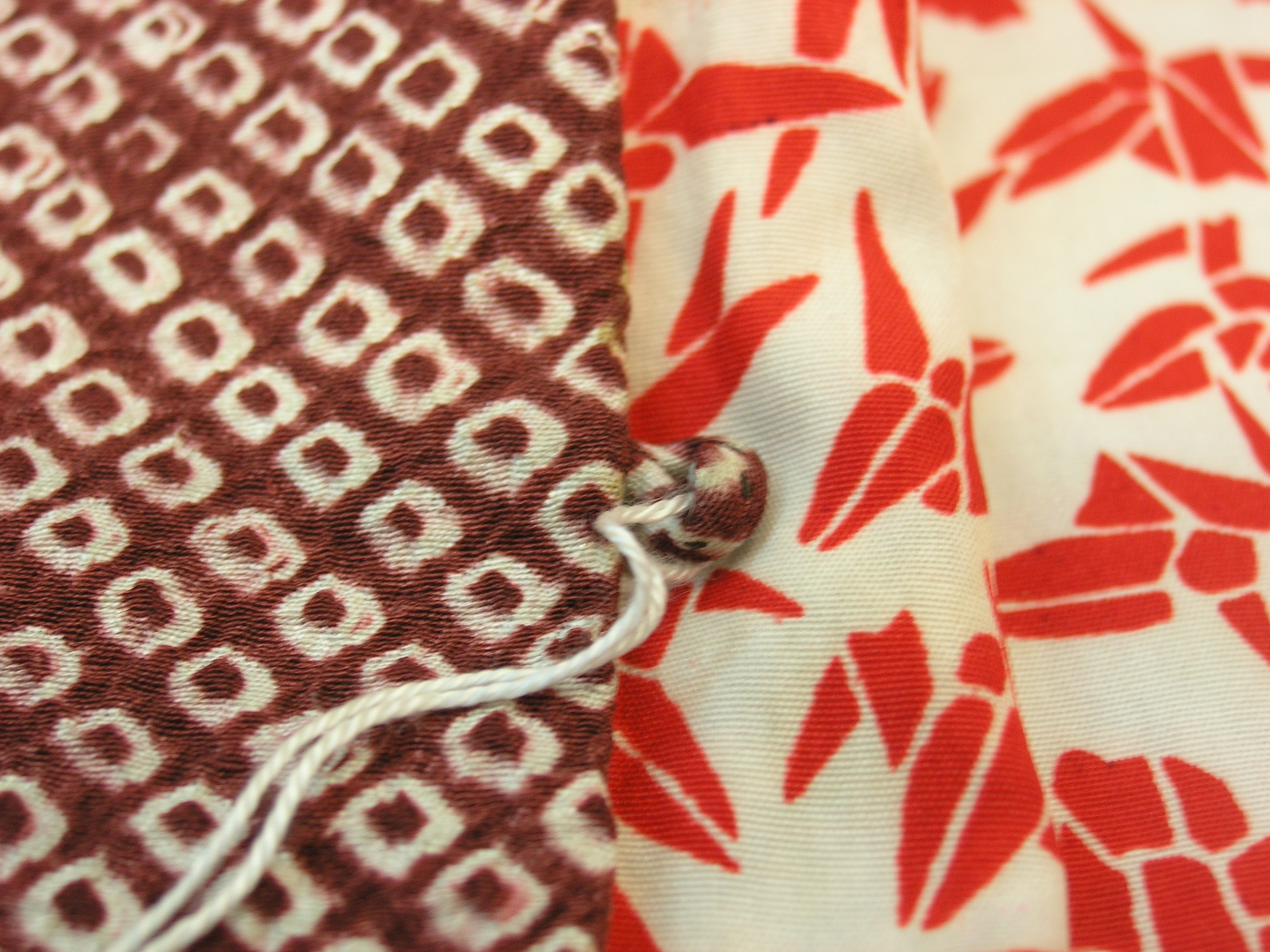
The front edge of a shibori haori, showing the loop for the haori himo (haori ties) and crane-print lining fabric

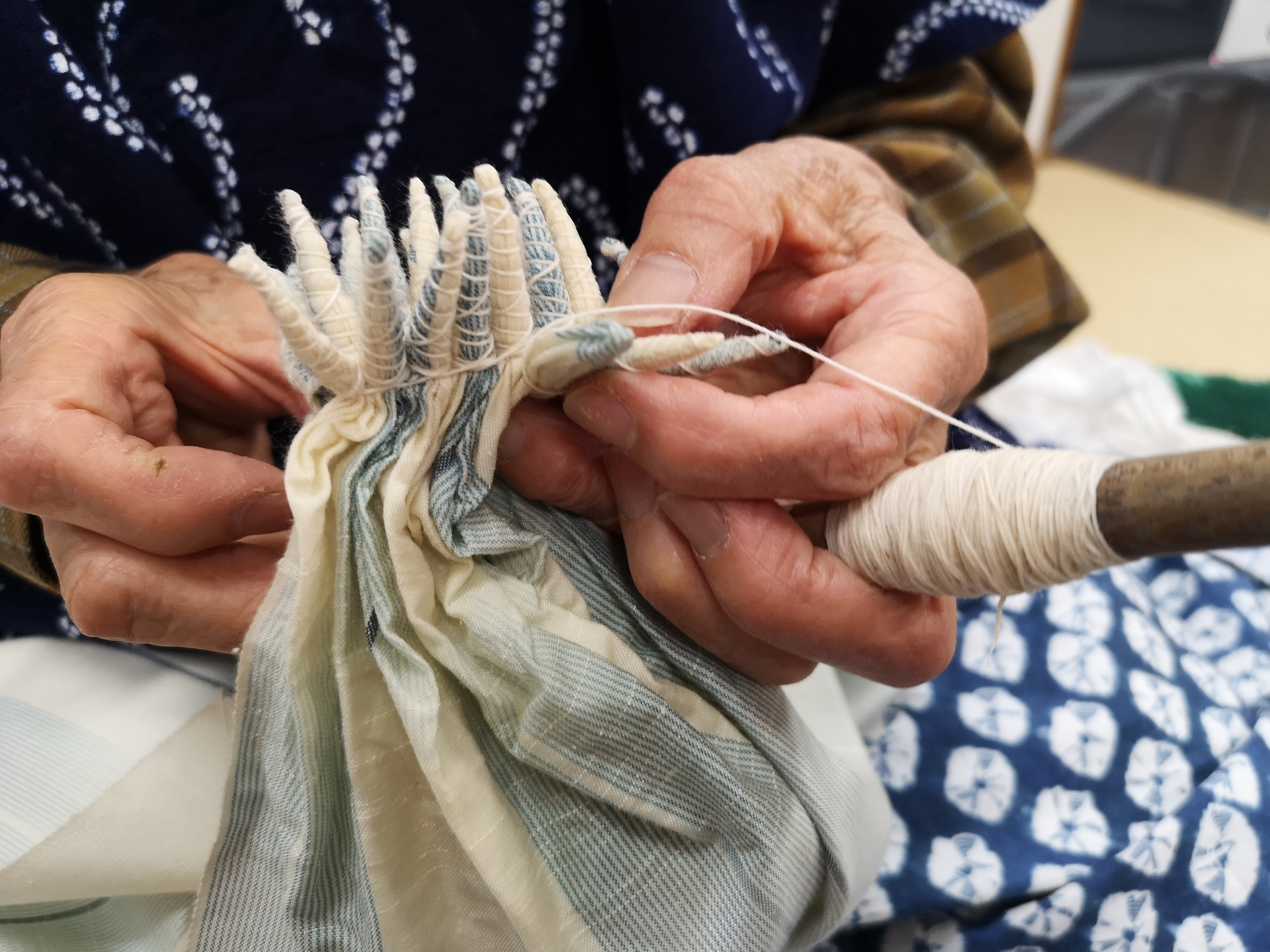
Kumo shibori being tied with shike-ito thread.

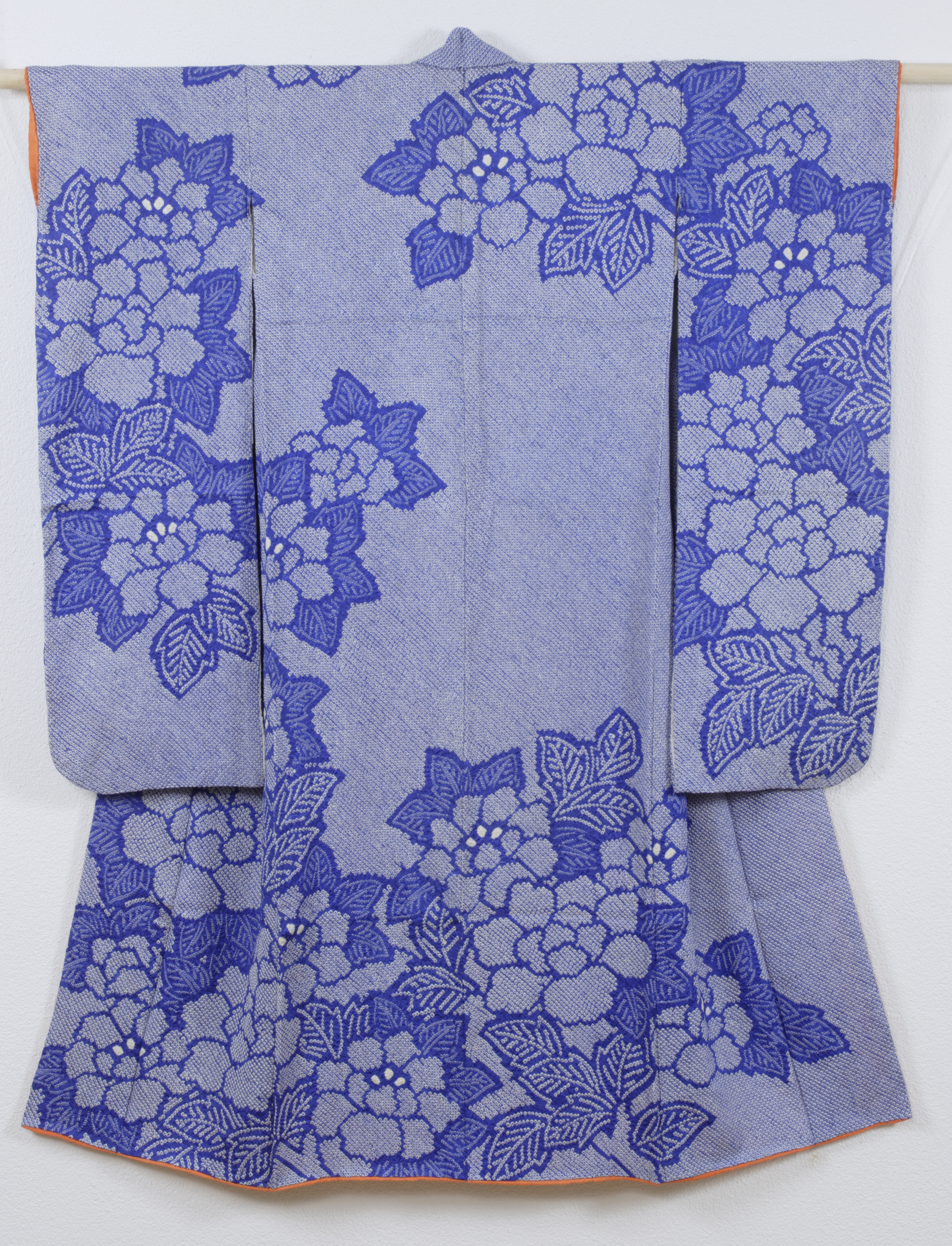
A full-shibori furisode dyed entirely in kanoko shibori.

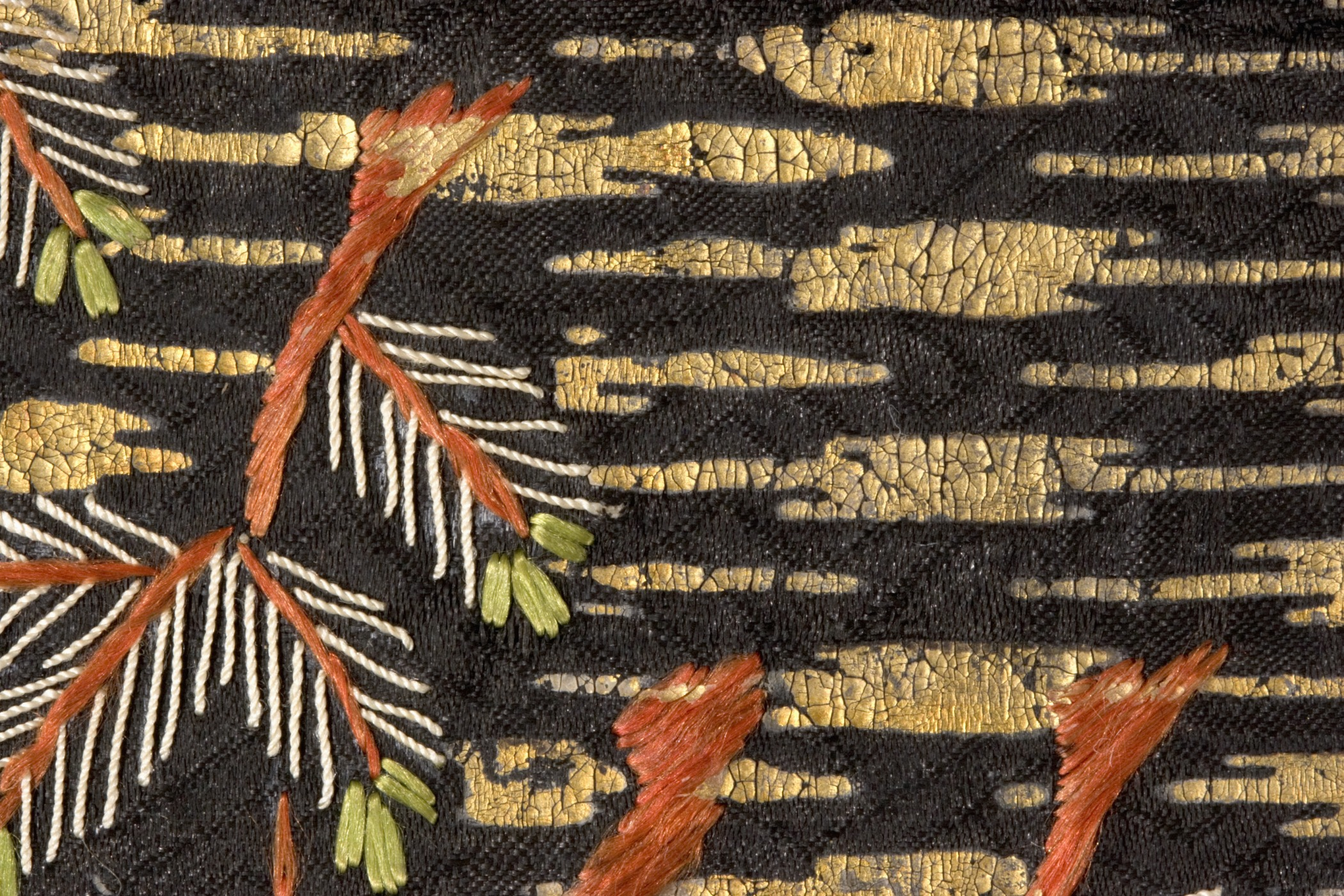
Detail of silk (kanako shibori) with embroidery, Japan, 17th century

== See also ==
- Bandhani
- Leheriya
- Sungudi
- Tie-dye
- Tritik
- List of Traditional Crafts of Japan
