= Bandhani =

Tie-dyeing technique of India

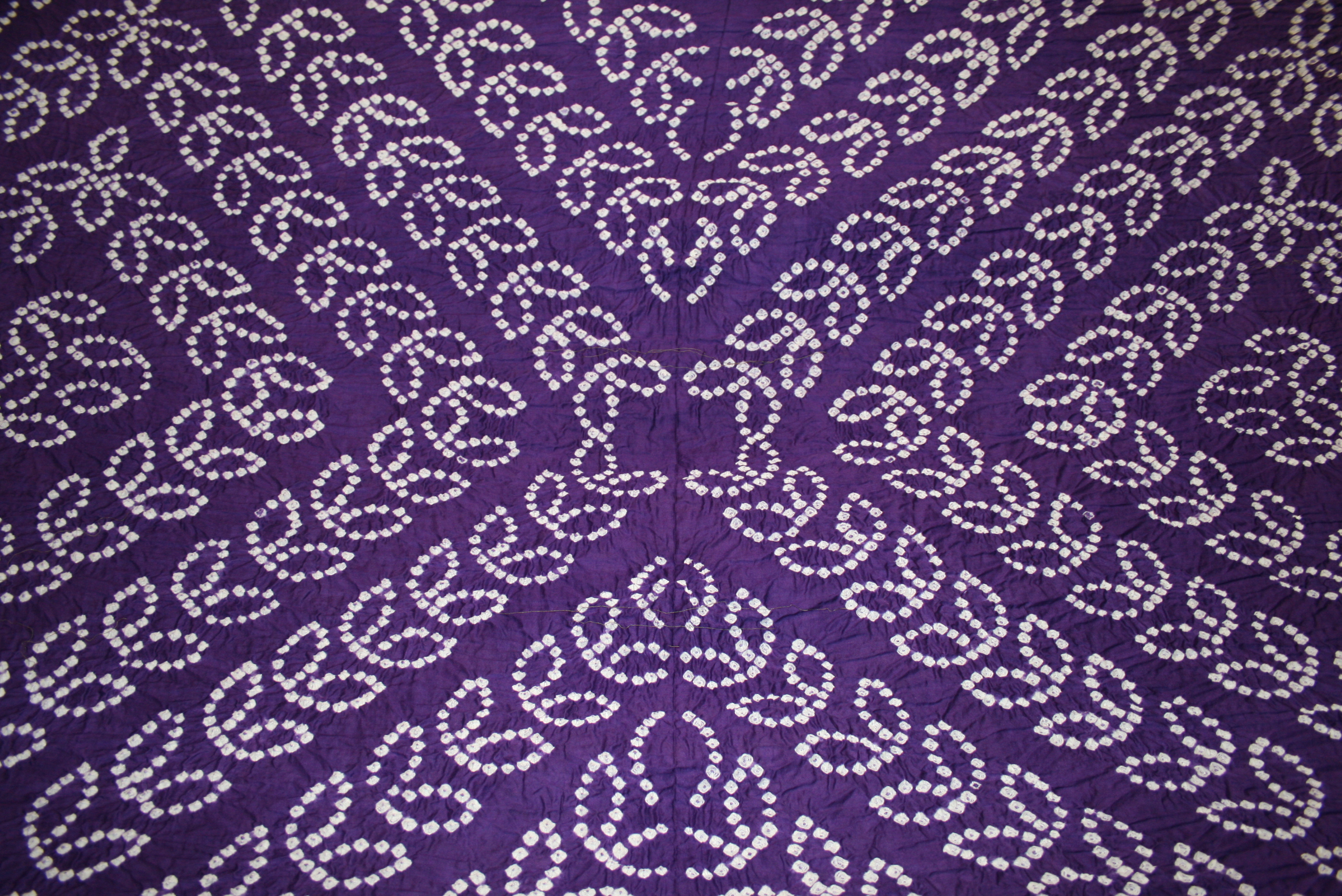
Bandhani craft

Bandhani (also known as bandhej, bandhni, piliya, and chungidi) are a type of Indian tie-dye textiles. The fabric is made by pinching very small portions of cloth and tying them by plucking the cloth with the fingernails into many tiny bindings that form a figurative design to form an intricate pattern of dots. The cloth is then placed into different dye vats.

Today, centers associated with bandhani making are mostly situated in Rajasthan and Gujarat, and also in Sindh and Tamil Nadu (where it is known as sungudi).

Other tying techniques include mothra, ekdali and shikari depending on the manner in which the cloth is tied. The final products are known with various names including khombi, ghar chola, patori and chandrakhani.

== Etymology ==
The term bandhani is derived from the Sanskrit verbal root bandh ("to bind, to tie").

== Overview ==
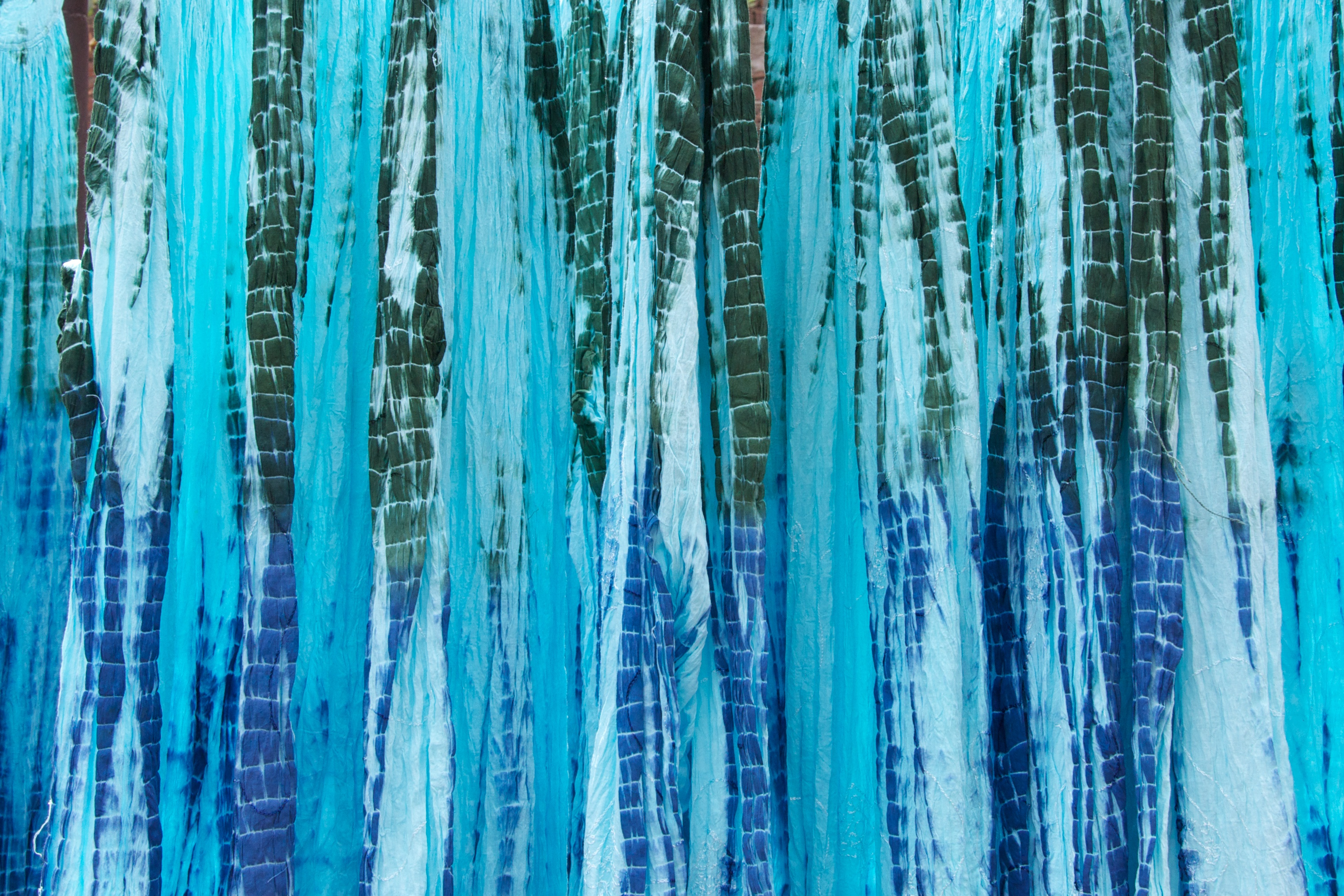
Bandhani, tie-dye drying in Jaipur.

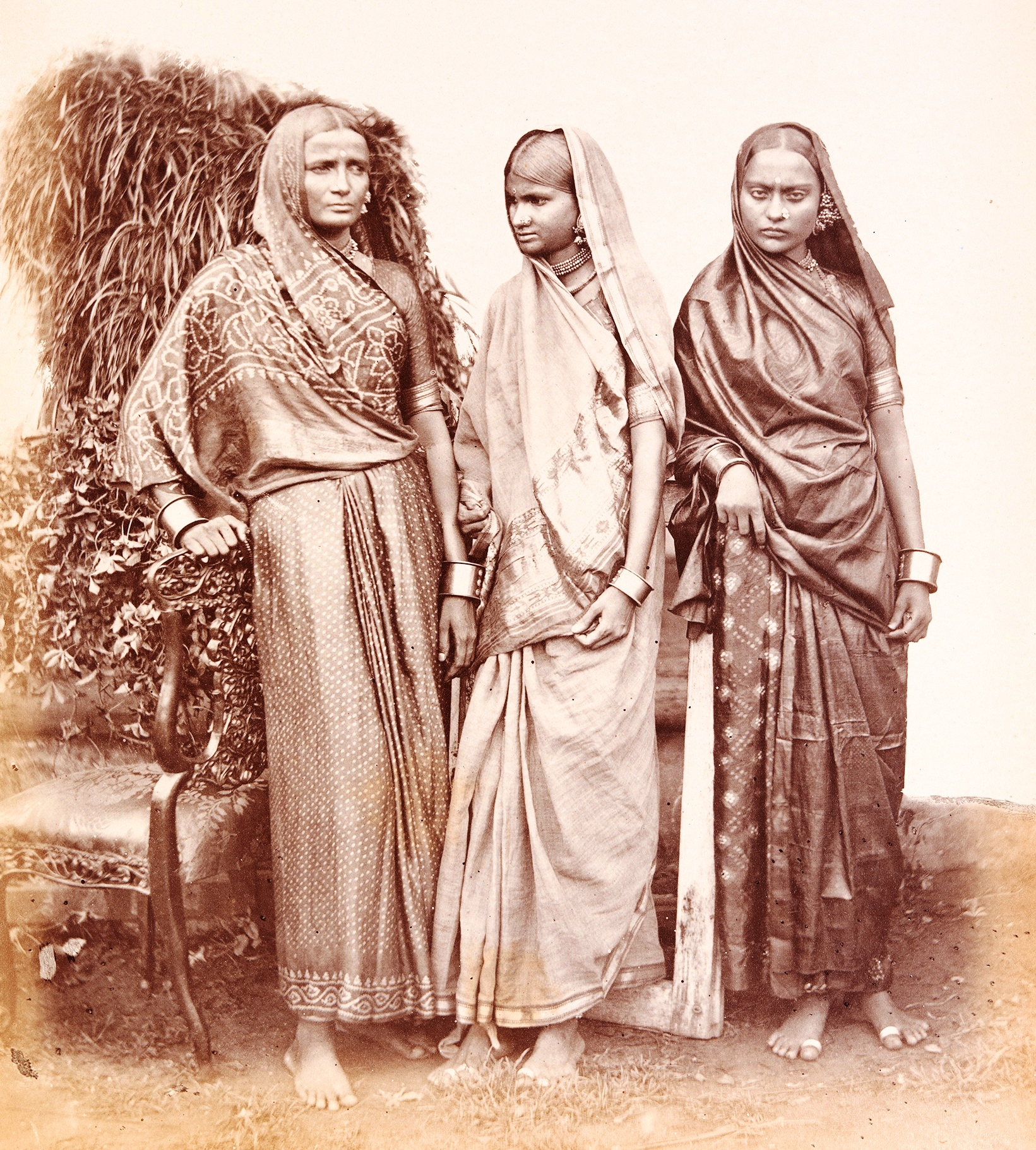
Group of women wearing bandhani sari, ca. 1855–1862.

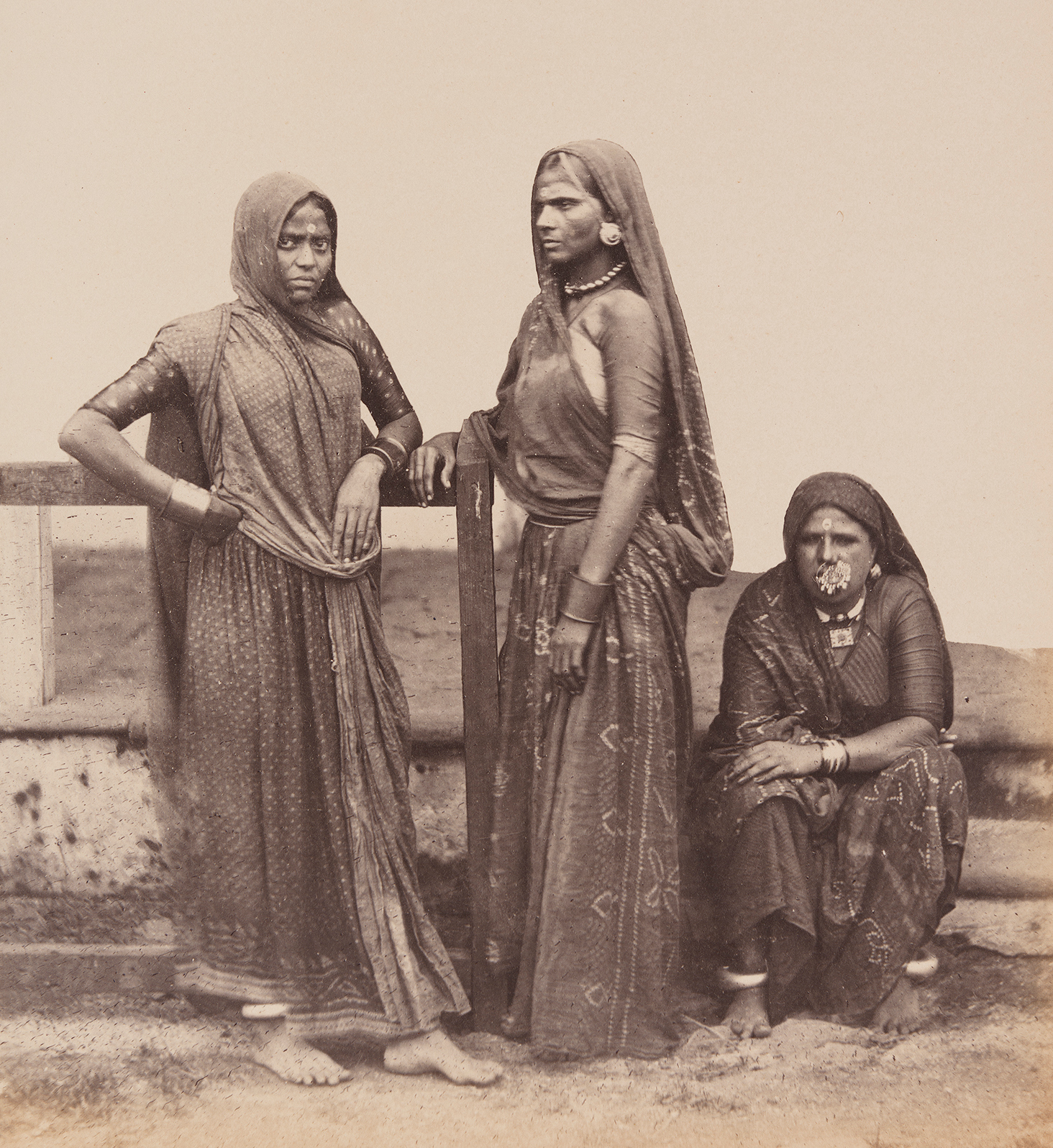
Group of women dressed in bandhani sari c. 1855–1862.

The art of bandhani is a highly skilled process. The technique involves dyeing a fabric which is tied tightly with a thread at several points, thus producing a variety of patterns like chandrakala, bavan baug, shikari etc.; Depending on the manner in which the cloth is tied. The main colours used in bandhani are yellow, red, blue, green, and black. Each colour is traditionally tied to specific cultural meaning. Red is a symbol of marriage and is connected to rituals of married women, yellow stands for spring and is connected to both the season and childbirth, saffron is the colour of renouncer of the world and connects with warriors ready to give up their life in war or to yogis who give up worldly life, black and maroon are used for mourning.

As bandhani is a tie and dye process, dying is done by hand and hence best colours and combinations are possible in bandhanis. There are two types of dyeing traditionally categorised according to durability of colours - pakka, in which the colours do not come off easily and kaccha, in which the colours fade or wash off easily. Historically, kaccha technique was the more preferred one as the colours could be refreshed again and again while pakka technique was considered to be suitable for old people. The finest and most complicated patterns, whether for men's turbans or women's drapes called odhnis, were always dyed in kaccha colours. The main colours used in bandhani are natural. T. H. Hendley, writing in the 19th-century, provided the organic sources of the colours used for bandhani, most of them like the red ( both pakka and kaccha), indigo were derived from flowers while yellow by mixing turmeric with buttermilk.

In Gujarat, the bandhani work has been exclusively carried out by the Khatri community of Kutchh and Saurashtra. A meter length of cloth can have thousands of tiny knots known as 'bheendi' in the local language (Gujarati). These knots form a design once opened after dyeing in bright colours. Traditionally, the final products can be classified into 'khombhi', 'ghar chola', 'chandrakhani', 'shikari', 'chowkidar', 'ambadal' and other categories. Bandhani work in Rajasthan has different colours and designs than the Kutch and Saurashtra regions of Gujarat. Establishments of varying sizes in the entire Kutch belt in Gujarat produce many varieties of bandhani. This bandhani style is called as the Kutchi bandhani.

The bold patterns of bandhani are very similar in design, motifs, and technique in the desert belt encompassing northern Kutch in Gujarat, Western Rajasthan, and even Sindh in Pakistan.

Bandhani tying is often a family trade, and the women of these families work at home to tie patterns. Pethapur, Mandvi, Bhuj, Anjar, Jetpur, Jamnagar, and Rajkot are some of the main towns in Gujarat, where bandhani is created. The city of Bhuj in Gujarat is well known for its red bandhani. Dyeing process of bandhani is carried out extensively in this city, as the water of this area is known to give a particular brightness to colours, specifically reds and maroons. As with other Indian textiles, in bandhani too different colours convey different meanings. People believe that red is an auspicious colour for brides.

== History ==
Earliest evidence at Indus Valley civilization sites suggests that dyeing was done as early as 4000 B.C. The ancient city of Mohenjo-daro may have early traces of bandhani art. The earliest example of the most pervasive type of bandhani dots can perhaps be seen in the 6th-century paintings depicting the life of Buddha found on the wall of the Ajanta Caves. Texts from the era of Alexander the Great also talk about the beautiful printed cottons of India.

The first bandhani sari finds mention in Bāṇabhaṭṭa's Harshacharita at a royal wedding.

It is believed that wearing a bandhani sari can bring a good future to a bride. The dyers have experimented with the use of different elements both natural and man-made for ages. Also, there are experiments with different binding/tying techniques to create patterns on cloth immersed in containers of dye. Different types of tie and dyes have been practiced in India.

== Bandhej sari ==
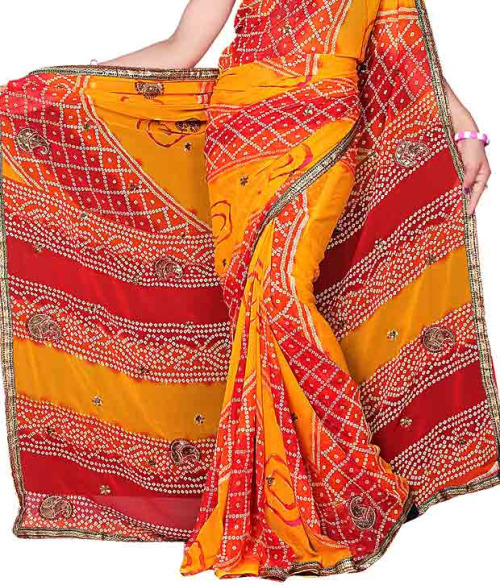
Bandhej sari

Bandhej sari, which is also known as bandhani sari, is specially found in Gujarat and Rajasthan. As per the region of manufacturing the patterns of bandhej sari may vary. Fine varieties of bandhej are created in Pethapur, Mandvi, Bhuj, Anjar, Jamnagar, Jetpur, Porbandar, Rajkot, Udaipur, Jaipur, Ajmer, Bikaner, Churu etc. They are considered prized possessions of married women and are mostly essential part of traditional bridal trousseau. In Rajasthan and Gujarat, bandhani fabrics are very popular with men and women but bandhani sari form a ritual necessity for married women for many ceremonies. Many Gujarati brides wear 'ghar chola', a type of bandhej sari, for their weddings. Though ghar chola literally means "robe for home", in ritual parlance, it means "attire for the new home or the home of the husband" and is usually a gift to the bride form her mother-in-law. In Rajasthan, during pregnancy or childbirth, the natal home gifts the women 'peeley ki sari'. It is a combination of yellow base with a broad red border with bandhani pattern on it.

== Process ==
Bandhani is a method of binding small knots and dyeing them in different colours to produce beautiful patterns. This tying was normally done with fingernails for making. But in some places of Rajasthan, craftsmen wear a metal ring with a pointy nail to help plucking the cloth easily.

The process of making a bandhani textile is not very difficult, but is very time-consuming. The fabric used for making bandhani saris and dupattas are loosely woven silk called georgette, or cotton known as malmal. The knots are tightly tied, and the rest of the fabric is dyed in multiple stages. This leaves the knots undyed and hence a beautiful flower-like pattern appears all over the cloth as a design.

Malmal (fine muslin), handloom or silk cloth were the traditional choices but now chiffon, georgette and crepe are also being used as base fabrics for bandhani. This cloth is washed to remove traces of starch, and then bleached to attain a clear base. It is then folded into two or four layers depending on the thickness of the cloth. A designer marks the layout of the pattern on the material using wooden blocks dipped in geru, a natural clay earth pigment mixed with water. The cloth is tied from the areas not to be dyed. The process requires patience, expertise and meticulousness on part of the artist. The folds of the material within the small motif have to be lifted and tied together. The material with the first set of ties is dyed yellow. The material is again tied and dyed into red or green. The artist moves from lighter to darker shades and the use of more and varied colours makes the process complicated. If the border has to be darker all the lighter parts are tied and covered with plastic foil and the edges are dyed with the required colors. Repeated tying and dyeing produces elaborate designs. The designs may run into a single motif and or a combination of large and small motif alternating in some order.

== Gallery ==
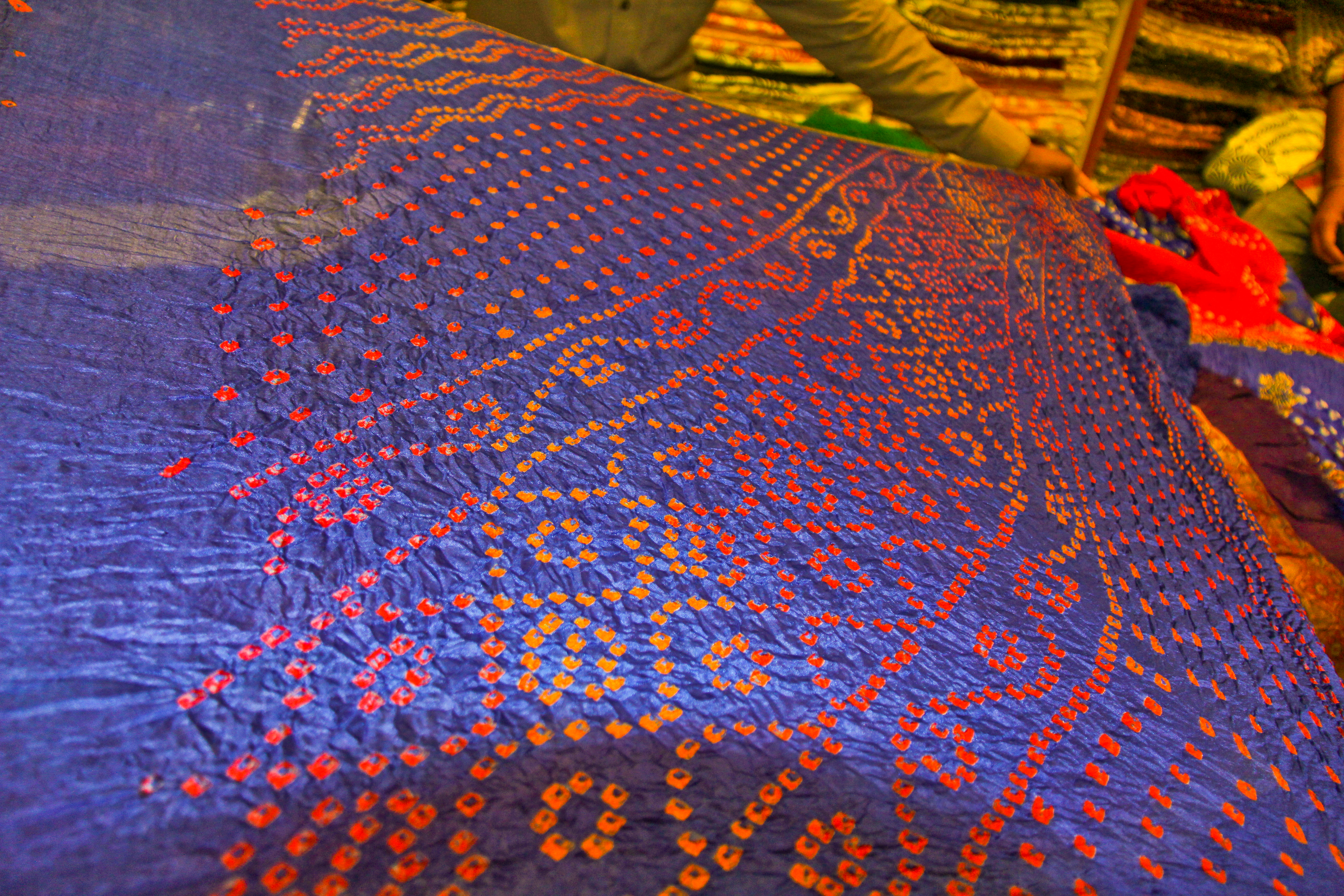
Bandhani sari

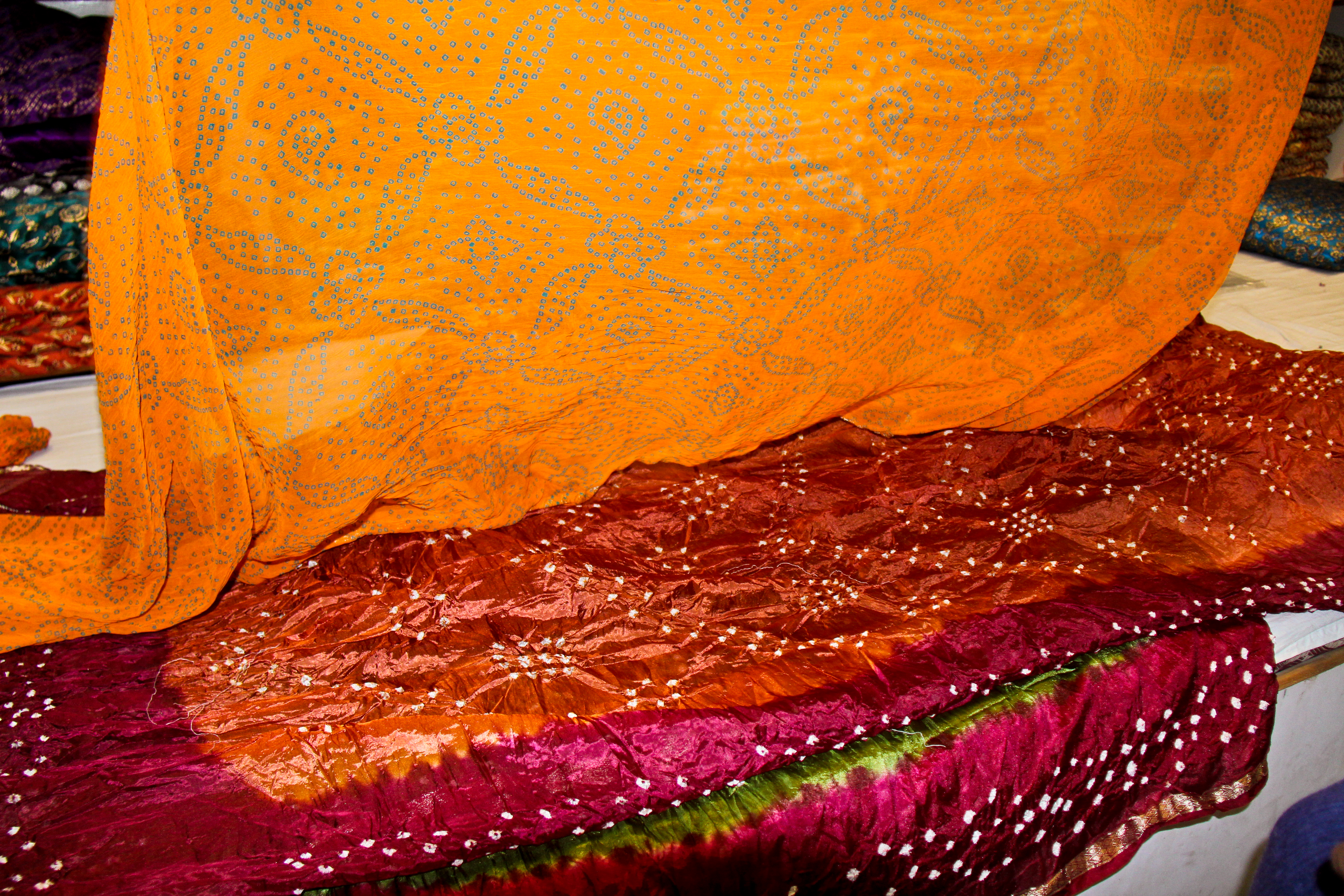
Bandhani

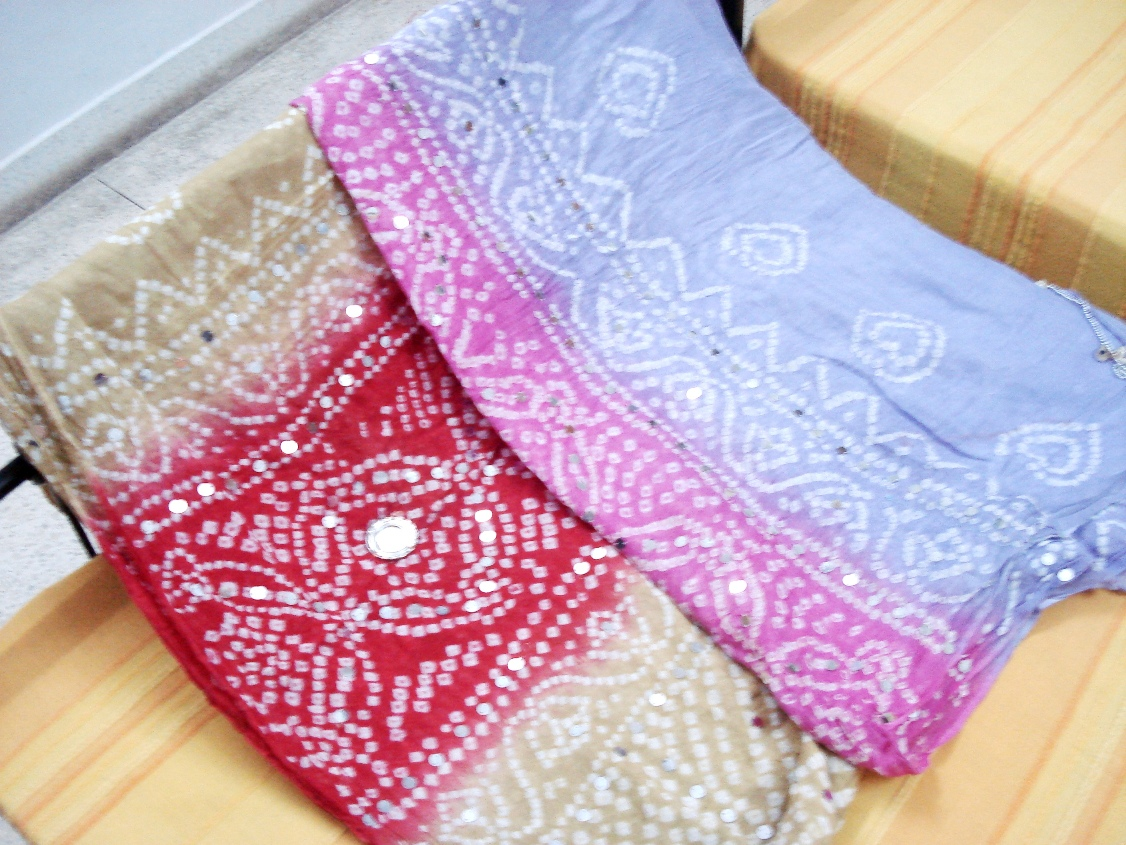
Bandhani sari

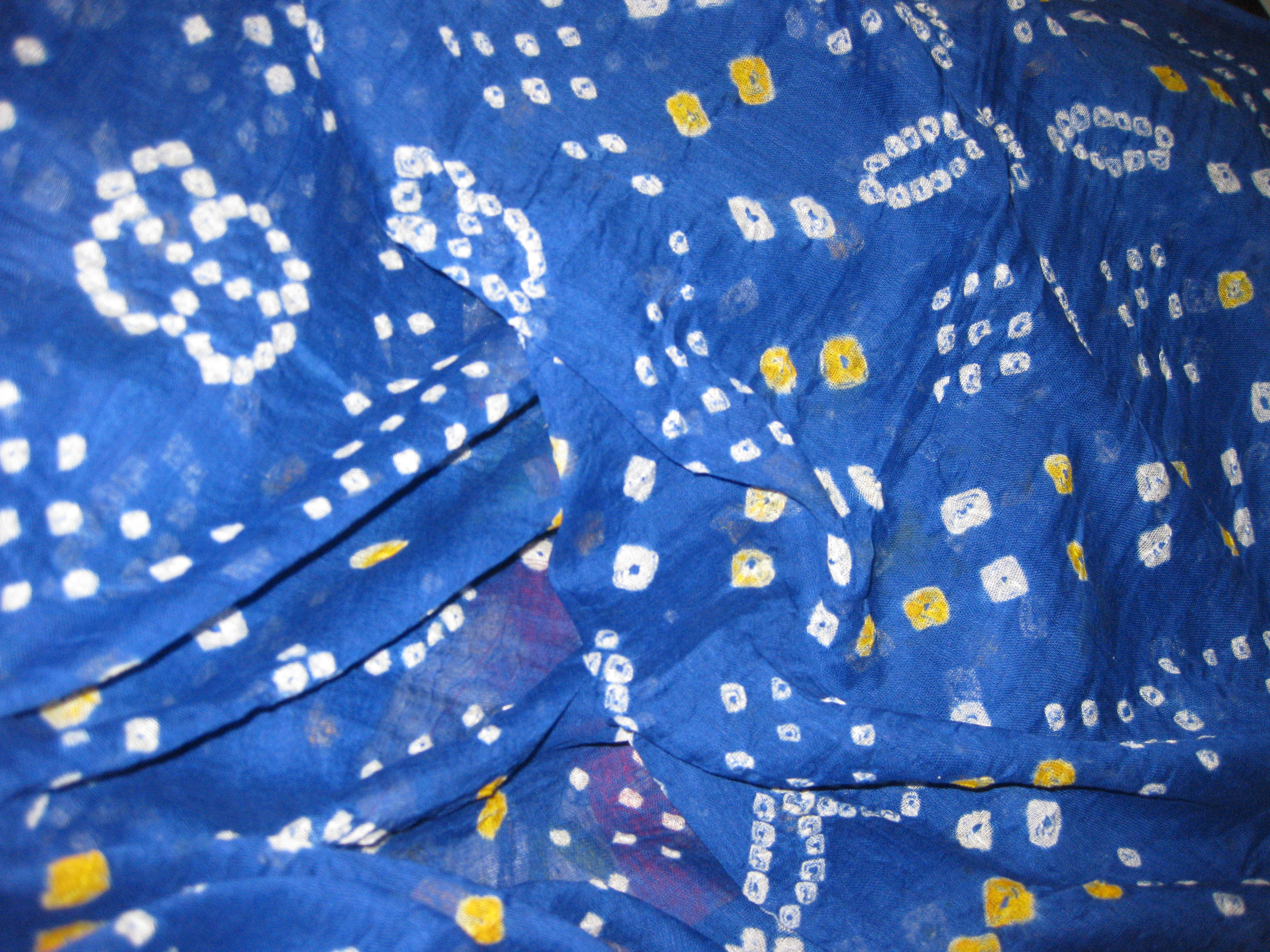
Bandhani dupatta

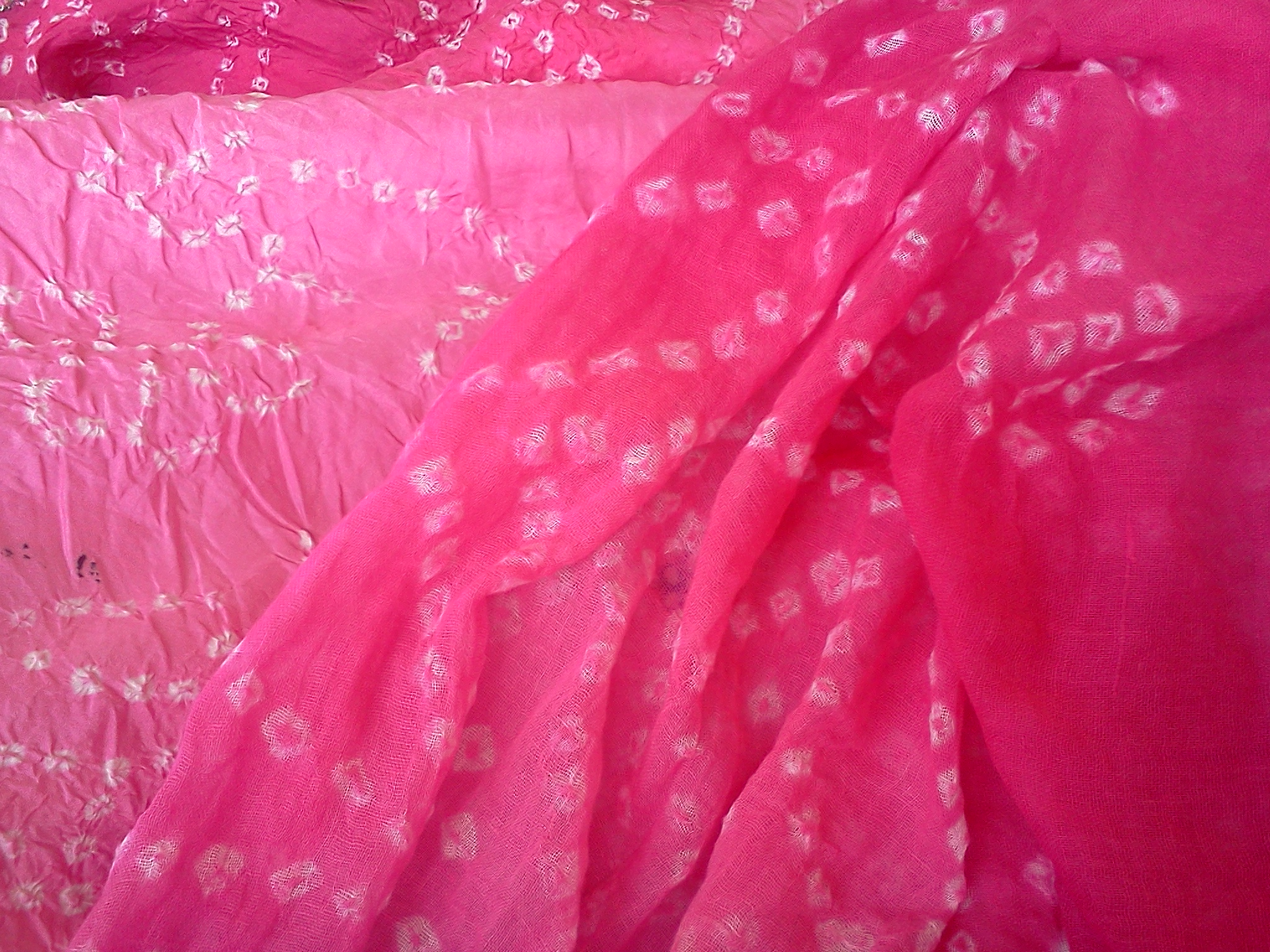
Bandhani dupatta

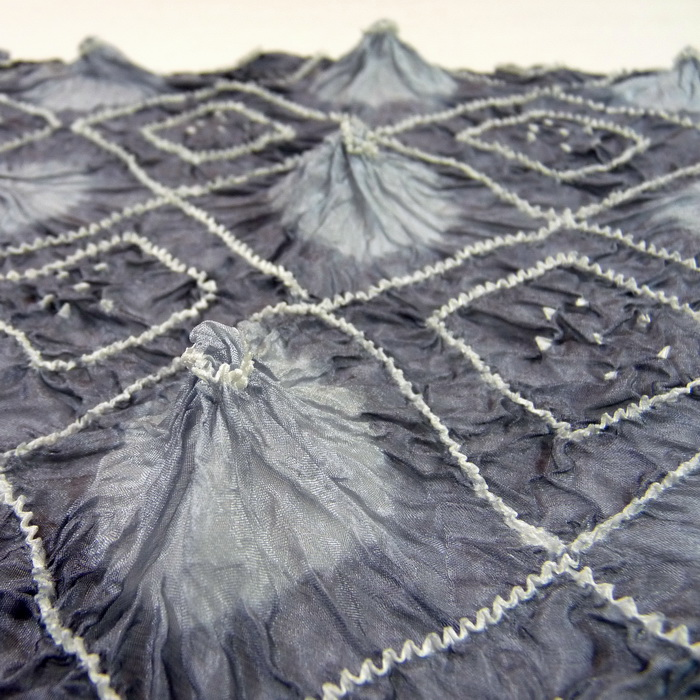
Preparing bandhani craft

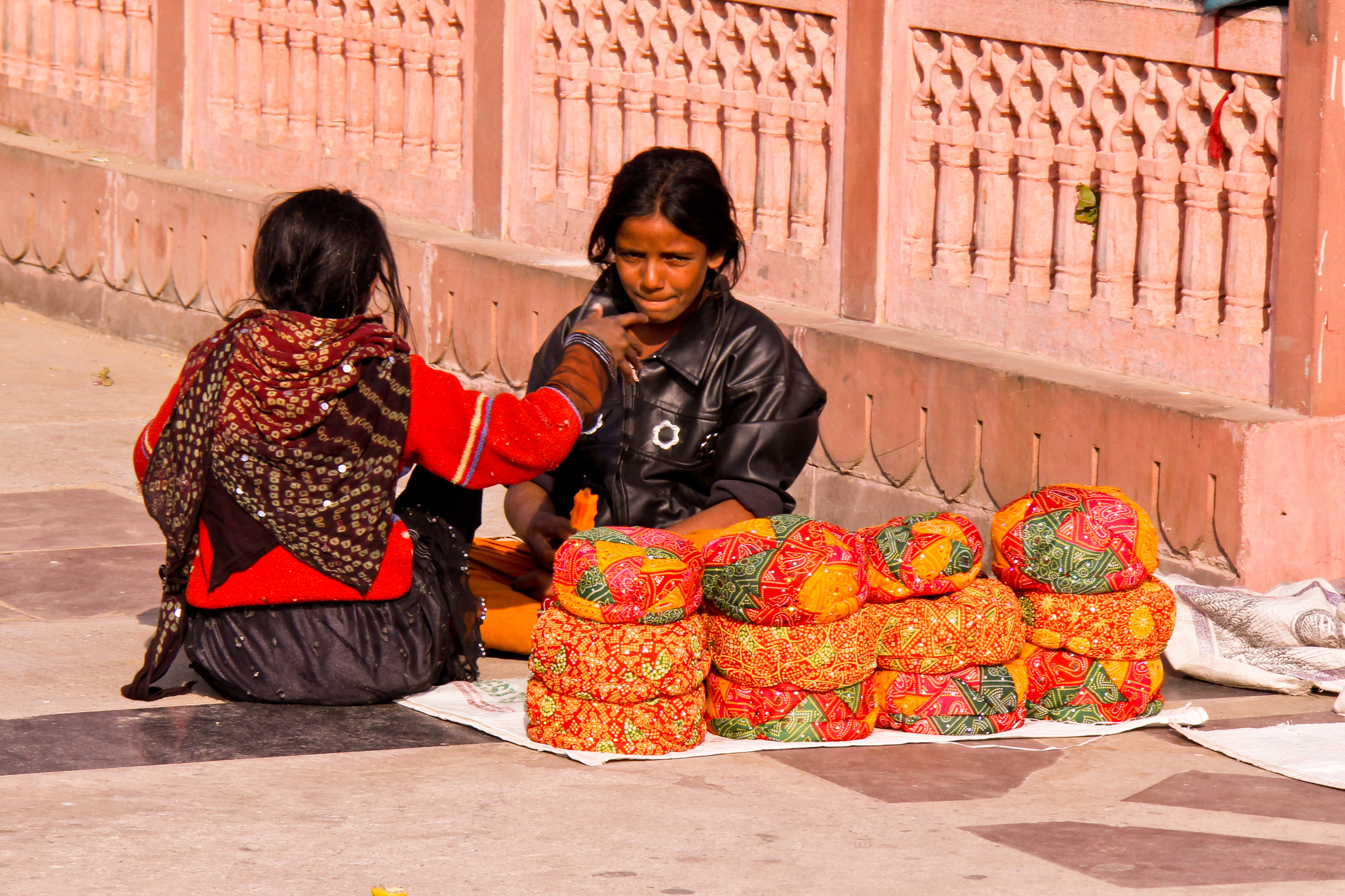
Rajasthani bandhani pagri

== See also ==
- Bandana
- Leheriya
- Shibori
- Tie-dye
- Tritik
