= Madurai Sungudi =

Design of Madurai, Tamil Nadu, India

- Geographical indication
- Description: Textile signature art tradition of Madurai
- Type: Textile art
- Area: Madurai
- Country: India
- Registered: 2006
- Material: Cotton fabric with tie and dye method of traditional prints

Madurai Sungudi is a design from Madurai, in the Indian state of Tamil Nadu, which is an exclusive textile product traditionally produced using tie and dye (using natural dyes) method by the Saurashtrians, who migrated to Madurai under the patronage of King Thirumalai Naicker in the 17th century. The fabric's traditional popular use is as a saree; the fabric is now also used to make shirts, salwars, shawls, handbags, bed sheets and pillow cases. The product has been given protection under the GI registration act.

In recent years, in view of tough competition from other textile fabrics, to meet the market demand this fabric, "sungudi" as it is commonly known, is made with modern designs and techniques of block printing, wax printing and screen printing.

== Geographical indication ==
The Madurai Sungudi, produced in Madurai city, a cottage industry product, is given protection under the Geographical Indications of Goods (Registration & Protection) Act (GI Act) 1999 of the Government of India. It was registered by the Controller General of Patents Designs and Trademarks under the title "Madurai Sungudi" and recorded under GI Application number 21, Class 24 - Textile and Textile Goods and Class 25 – Clothing including Sarees and Rumal, as a textile product. The GI tag was approved on 12 December 2005.

== Location ==
Sungudi is made in Madurai City, which is located in Tamil Nadu on the banks of the Vaigai River.

== History ==
From the 8th to 11th century, The Saurashtrians from Saurashtra region (present day Gujarat) started migrating towards Southern India due to the frequent Muslim invasions, these merchants upon the invitation of Chola, Pandya, Vijayanagara, Nayak and Thanjavur Maratha Kings set up mercantile silk-weaving guilds throughout Southern India and were involved in the trade of silk clothes and diamonds to the royal families of ancient South India, as the silk became the attire of royal families after the period of Gupta dynasty. Some of them settled down in Madurai, where the local king of the Nayak dynasty welcomed them. Here, they came to be known as "Patnūlkarars" (silk thread people). In order to please the local kings, the Saurashtrians of Madurai, who were expert craftsmen in fabric weaving and trade of silk garments, created a gift item of cotton fabric suited for use in the tropical conditions, and called it the "Madurai Sungdi."

In Saurashtra, the word 'sungudi' relates to the Sanskrit word "sunnam" meaning "round", representing the circular dots that are printed on the fabric as a prominent and special motif.

While the dotted designs of the fabric are inspired by cosmic stars, its knotting pattern is a copy of the knots with which women tie their hair.

== Product details ==
The primary input to make this fabric is woven unbleached cotton fabric or saree in which the warp and weft are made of 80s and 100s combed /carded yarn respectively. Then this fabric is subjected to the tie and dye process. The fabric is first bleached and printed with motifs. Then it is subject to the process of tying the knot called as "putta" or "bandhani" work. In a fabric of more than 6 yards, the number of puttas are more than 20,000 puttas or knots which are spaced uniformly and stitched by a single thread. The "pallu" (loose end of a saree) part of the saree or the fabric is made in a contrast colour by tying it firmly before subjecting it to a further process of treating in a solution of groundnut oil and alkaline earth. In this process, the fabric dipped in the solution is tamped well by foot several times and kept in a wet state for 2–3 days. It is then taken out and washed in the Vaigai River water (the water of this river is believed to give a special sheen to the fabric) and then dried. This process is repeated over a week. After washing and drying, the fabric is subjected to dyeing in a vat with a solution of alizarine red and kasa leaves. After dyeing the fabric is steamed and dried.

A special characteristic of the Sungudi saree is that the knots created along the lines of the fabric cloth with red pigment prevent colours from intruding into the knotted part of the fabric when it is subject to the dyeing process in the vat. After the dyeing process, the knots are released by removing the thread and the knotted parts. In the traditional dyeing process, vegetable dyes are used to obtain different colours. However, in the modern dyeing process artificial chemical dyes (aniline) like alizarine red, naphthol and indigo are used to obtain the red, blue and other colour effects.

It takes 10 to 15 days to make a traditional Sundgudi saree, with women involved in the tying process while the dyeing process is outsourced. This saree is a traditional dress of women of some communities worn during marriages.

To encourage this cottage industry, the government of Tamil Nadu has exempted the sale of this fabric from levy of sales tax since 1959. In view of its unique design and quality it is also exported.

== See also ==
- Bandhani
- Leheriya
- Shibori
- Tie-dye
- Tritik
