= Chuni, Sichuan =

Chuni
- Township

Tibetan transcription(s)

Chinese transcription(s)
- Interactive map of Chuni
- Country: China
- Province: Sichuan
- Prefecture: Garzê Tibetan Autonomous Prefecture
- Time zone: UTC+8 (CST)

Chuni (杵坭乡) was a historical township in the Garzê Tibetan Autonomous Prefecture of Sichuan, China.

In 2019, Chuni had a total population of 3,117.

On 23 December 2019, Chuni Township was merged into Lengqi.
