= Chuni, Republic of Dagestan =

Chuni Чуни
- Selo
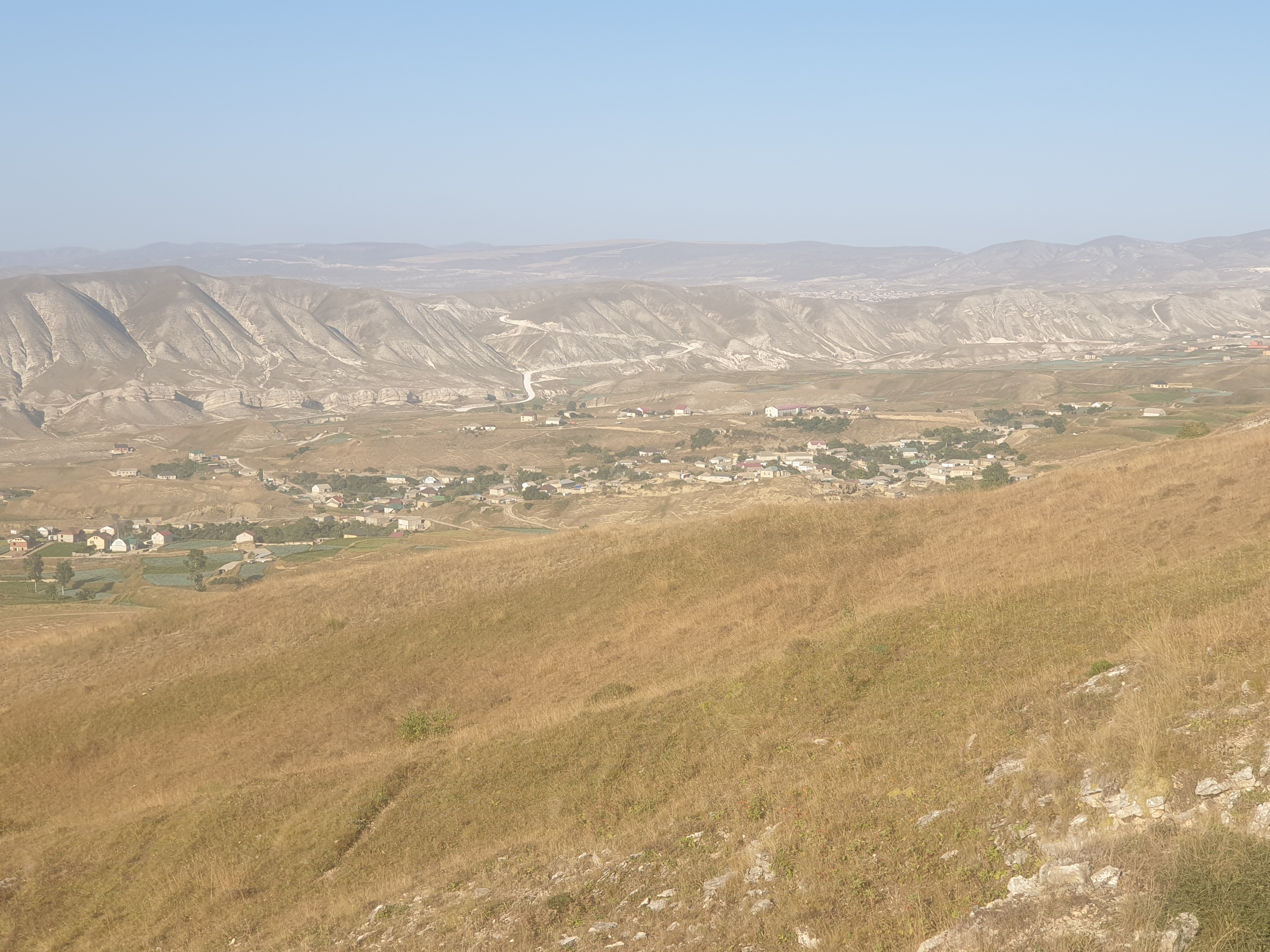

- Location within Republic of Dagestan Location within Russia
- Coordinates: 42°20′N 47°18′E
- Country: Russia
- Region: Republic of Dagestan
- District: Levashinsky District
- Time zone: UTC+3:00

Chuni (Russian: Чуни) is a rural locality (a selo) in Levashinsky District, Republic of Dagestan, Russia. The population was 881 as of 2010. There are 6 streets.

== Geography ==
Chuni is located 14 km south of Levashi (the district's administrative centre) by road. Chognimakhi and Kuknamakhi are the nearest rural localities.

== Nationalities ==
Avars live there.
