= Dupatta =

Cloth wrap worn as a shawl, scarf, or veil in the Indian Subcontinent

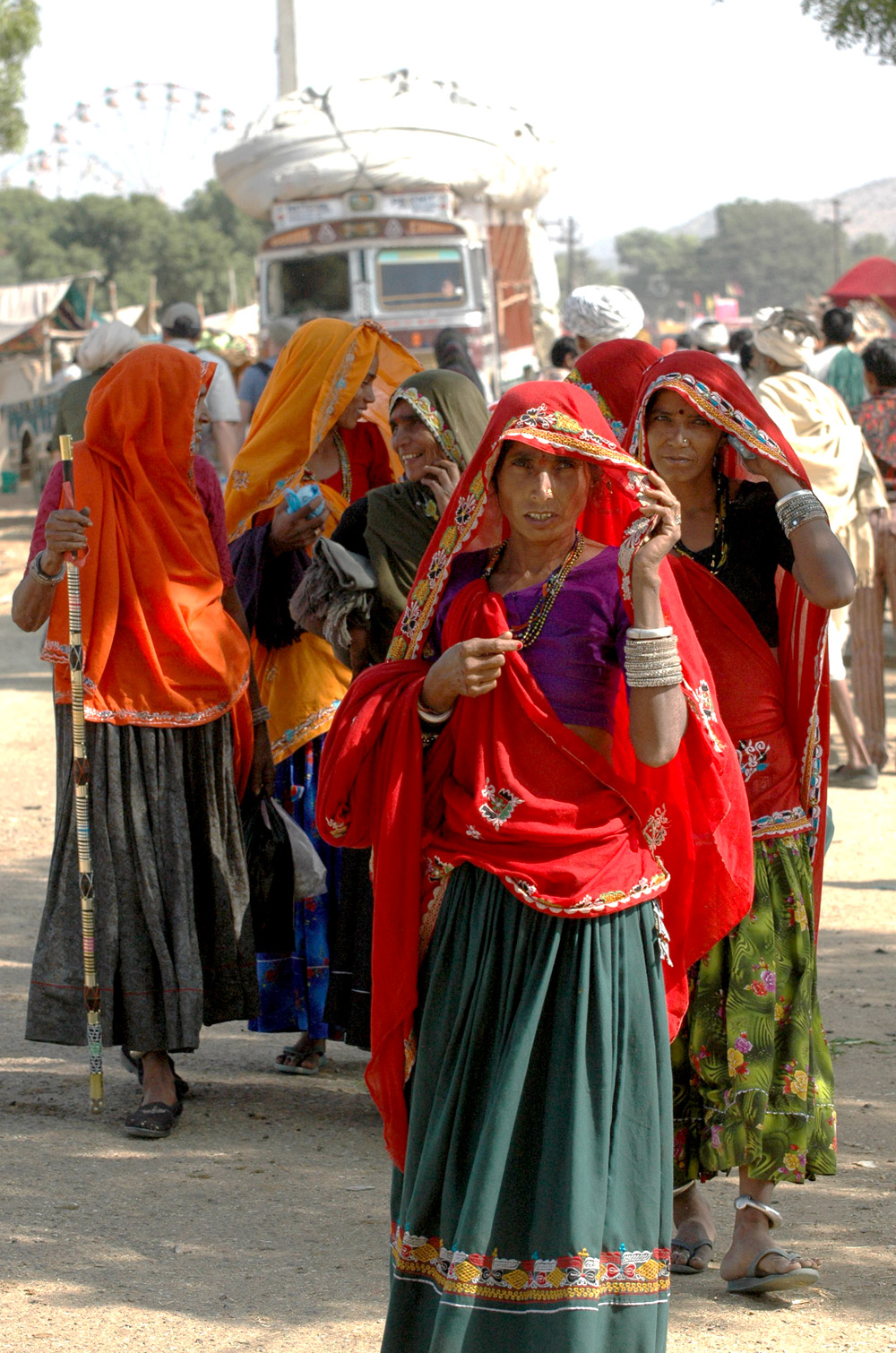
Indian village women wearing Odhni with Ghagra choli

The dupattā, also called chunni, chunari, chundari, lugda, rao/rawo, gandhi, pothi, orna, and odhni is a long shawl-like scarf traditionally worn by both women and men in the Indian subcontinent. The term dupatta is derived from Sanskrit, where du means "two", and patta means "strip of cloth" referring to a piece of clothing worn as part of upper body covering.

The dupatta is commonly associated with traditional women's attire such as lehenga choli, salwar kameez, and anarkali suits. The lehenga or ghagra/chaniya choli is a three-piece outfit which is made up of a skirt, called a ghagra or chaniya; a blouse, called a choli, and a dupatta. The dupatta is also worn as part of the shalwar kameez which is worn by women in India, Pakistan & Bangladesh, particularly in parts of northern India and Deccan region, consists of trousers known as salwar, a tunic known as kameez, and often a dupatta. The Anarkali suits feature a long, flared tunic paired with trousers and a dupatta. The Punjabi suit is worn in Punjab and Pakistan, it is another three piece outfit made up of trousers, called pyjama or salwar; a top, called a kurta or kameez, and the dupatta. The dupatta is worn over one shoulder, and traditionally, married women would also wear the dupatta over the head in temples or in front of elders.

Even though dupatta is typically associated with women's clothing, it's also worn with some traditional men's outfits like kurta sets and sherwanis, which are typically worn during special occasions such as weddings, festivals and other formal events.

== Etymology ==
The Hindi-Urdu word dupattā (दुपट्टा, دوپٹہ), meaning "shawl of doubled cloth," stemming from Sanskrit, is a combination of du- (meaning "two", from Sanskrit dvau, "two", and dvi-, combining form of dvau) and paṭṭā (meaning "strip of cloth," from paṭṭaḥ), i. e., stole.

== History ==
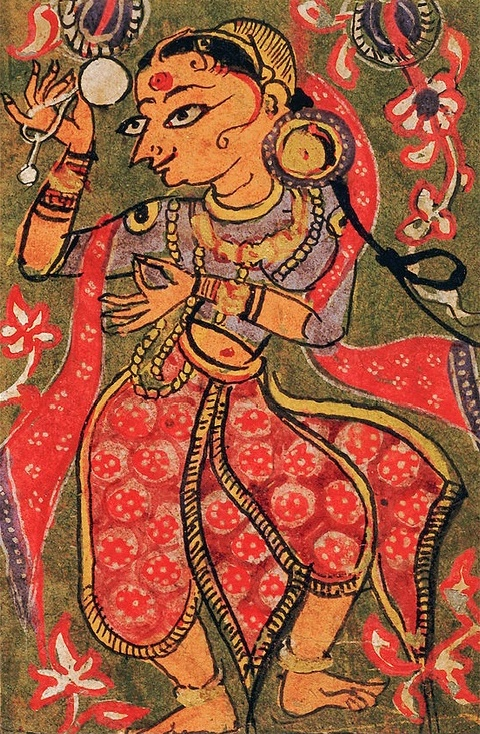
Dancing woman wearing dupatta, detail from Kalpa Sutra manuscript, c.1300s.

Early Sanskrit literature has a wide vocabulary of terms for the veils and scarfs used by women during the ancient period, such as avagunthana (cloak-veil), uttariya (shoulder-veil), mukha-pata (face-veil), and siro-vastra (head-veil). The dupatta is believed to have originated from the ancient uttariya. The uttariya appears in both Sanskrit and Pali literature, although the precise period is unknown. Sculptures in the Gandhara and Mathura schools of art depict sculptures with garments similar to the uttariya, which points to evidence of upper-body draping garments worn in South Asia.

=== Medieval and Mughal periods ===
During the medieval period, the dupatta was worn with traditional clothing in the Indian subcontinent. The dupattas were made of fine translucent muslin and were used to cover the head, shoulders, and face. This suggests that the garment existed in South Asian Culture before the arrival of Mughals.

Historically, men also wore dupattas, especially in 18th-century Mughal courts. They typically wore dupattas as part of their traditional outfits, often pairing them with a jama, pajama, and turban. It was typically draped across the chest, with its ends hanging down the back.

== Design and regional variations ==
Dupattas are made from textiles such as silk, cotton and velvet. The material of fabric influences the texture, appearance and draping styles. A design of a dupatta can also feature embrioderies, printed patter, decorative weaving techniques from different regions of the Indian subcontinent.

=== Types of Dupattas ===
Phulkari dupattas are associated with the North Indian regions such as Punjab and are usually made with cotton and silk that include designs such as geometric, floral, animal, and plat motif patterns.

Bandhani dupattas are asscoiated with Western regions such as Gujrat and Rajasthan. The dupattas produced are usually made with tie-dye techniques where small section of the fabric are tightly tied together before dyeing, creating distictive dotted geomatric patterns.

Banarasi dupattas are usually associated with eastern Indian regions such as Varanarasi and Uttar Pradesh using silk weaving tradions with intricate floral motifs, metallic threads and decorative woven patterns.

== Use ==
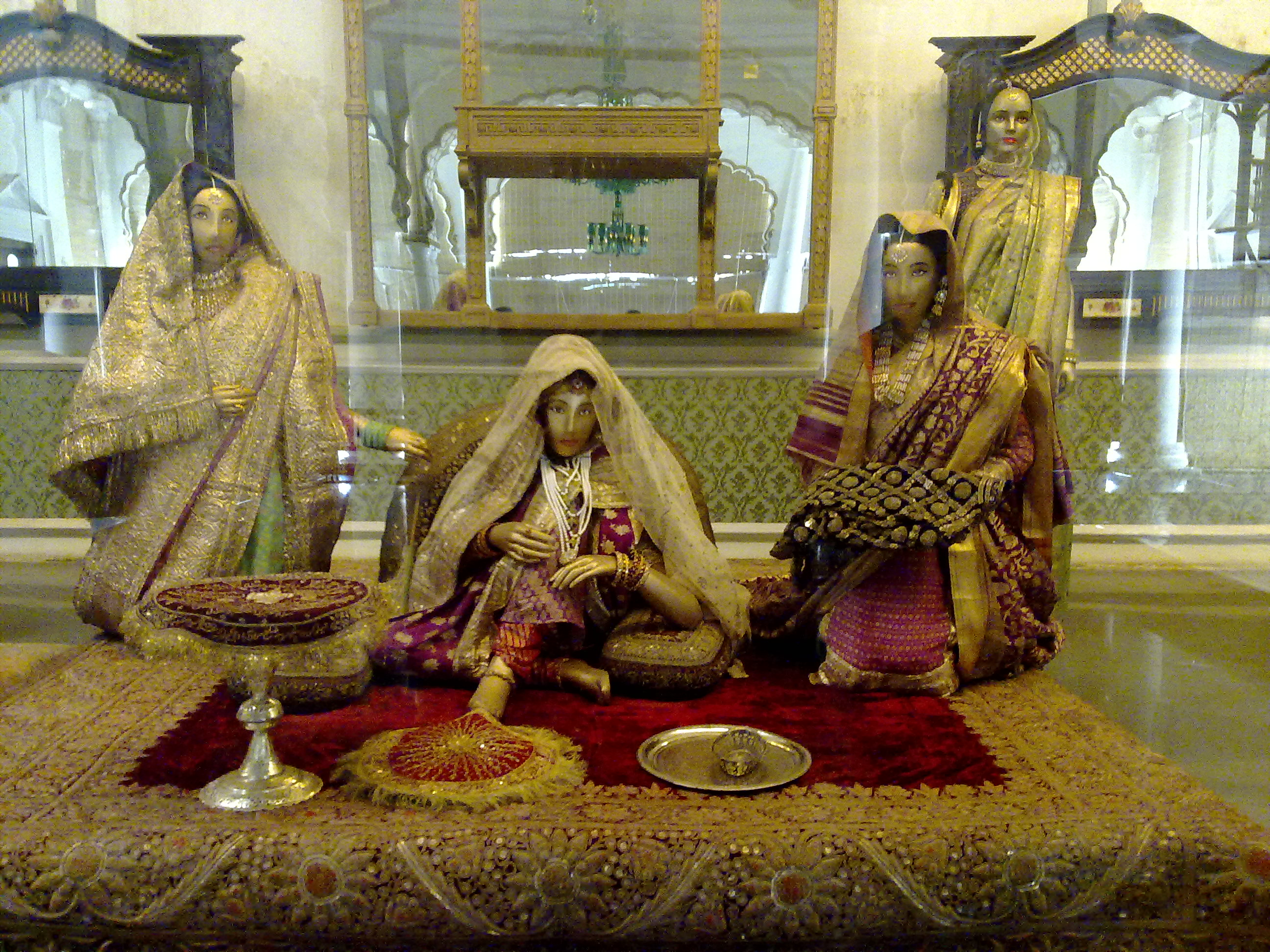
Deccani royal court attire dupattas on display at Chowmahalla Palace.

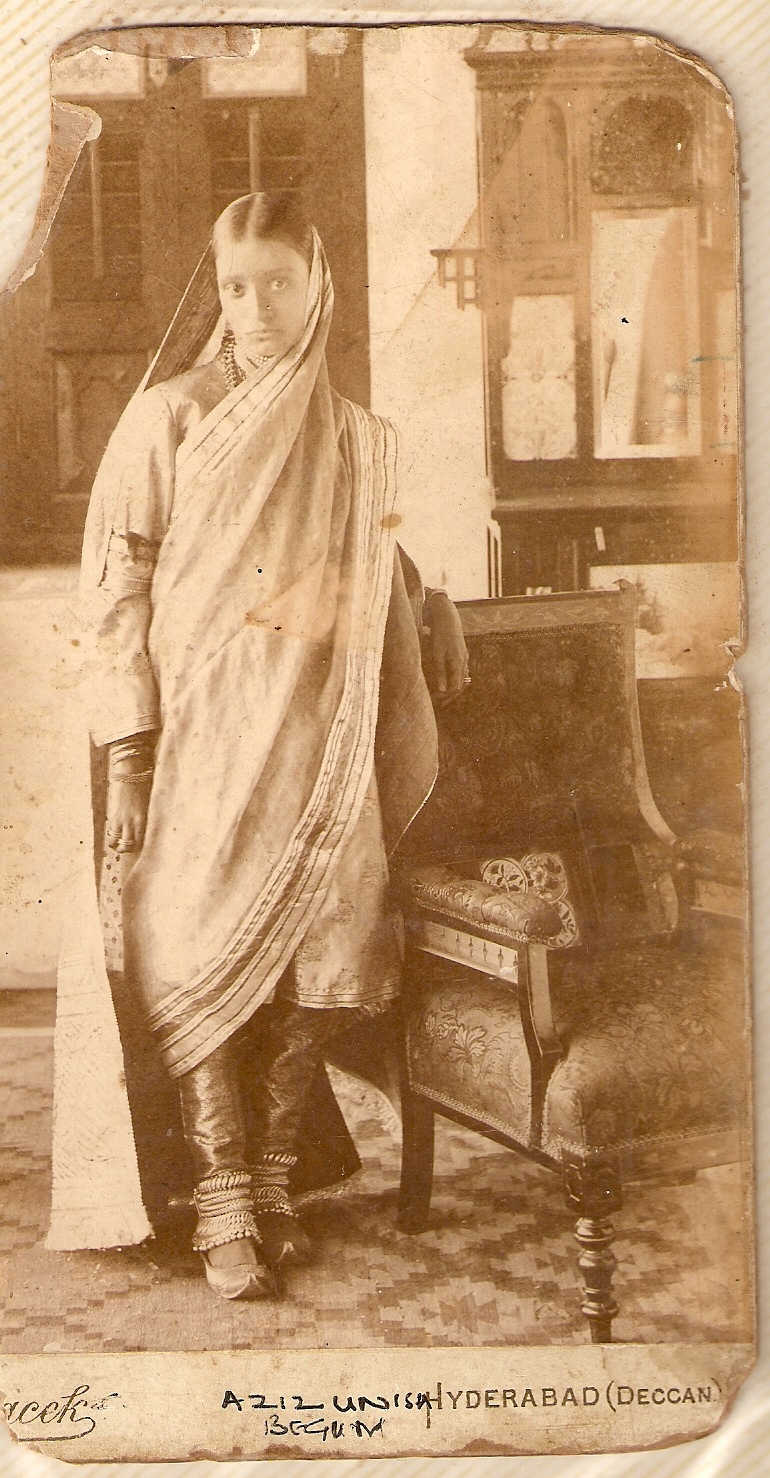
Hyderabadi lady wearing a dupatta in distinct style called Khada Dupatta, 20th century.

The dupatta is worn in many regional styles across the Indian Subcontinent. There is no single way of wearing the dupatta, and as time evolves and fashion modernizes, the style of the dupatta has also evolved.

A dupatta is traditionally worn over the left shoulder in India, and tucked in to a skirt on the opposite side. However, the dupatta can be free hanging over the shoulder, or, across the neck and behind both shoulders. A modern variation is to allow the length of the dupatta to drape elegantly around the waist and through the arms at the front. The material for the dupatta varies, but it is normally light and long, allowing for flow and variation.

When the dupatta is worn with the shalwar kameez, it covers the chest, creating a U or V shape. In addition to wearing the dupatta when going out in public, women in the Indian Subcontinent wear the dupatta as a veil when entering a mandir, church, gurdwara. In the context of the COVID-19 pandemic, it was not considered proper for use as a cloth face mask as it is a religious cloth.

A dupatta used as a covering for the head and face is called a ghoonghat. It was customary for new brides to wear a ghoonghat to protect them from the evil eye. In Nepal a dupatta or similar shawl is called a pachaura. Apart from its traditional role as a garment, the dupatta is sometimes used informally as a covering for the head or face, or as an improvised blindfold in games and recreational activities.

Since dupattas are worn across the Indian subcontinent, and are part of modest dress worn by women irrespective of religion or culture; they appear in diverse forms, many of which are characteristic of regions of the subcontinent. Phulkari dupattas, which originate from Punjab, display intricate floral patterns, while Bandhani dupattas (or Bandhej dupattas), originating from Gujarat and Rajasthan, feature tie-dye patterns. Dupattas can also be made from velvet or silk, or printed with modern designs; Banarasi silk dupattas, native to Varanasi, are adorned with zari brocade work and traditional motifs.

Sikh women traditionally wore the dupatta/chunni instead of a turban. However, some young, diasporic Sikh women have forgone wearing the dupatta and adopted the turban to emulate Sikh men.

Today, the dupatta remains a tradition and a statement in South Asian fashion. Across South Asian communities worldwide, the garment is seen as a way to maintain connections to cultural heritage while also adapting to contemporary Western Fashion. While dupatta styling remain traditional in Indian, Bengali and Pakistani fashion, it also styles as and accent piece in Western South Asina communities often in fusion outfits that blend traditional and modern aesthetics.

The dupatta has also become part of an online debate about the appropriation of cultural fashion. The traditional South Asian draping of the dupatta began appearing in Western fashion trends without acknowledging its cultural origins. Outfit styles featuring dupattas were recognized as a Scandinavian fashion trend rather than as South Asian fashion. This was viewed by many as rebranding of the garment without recognition of its heritage and dismissal of South Asian textiles and craftsmanship

== Gallery ==
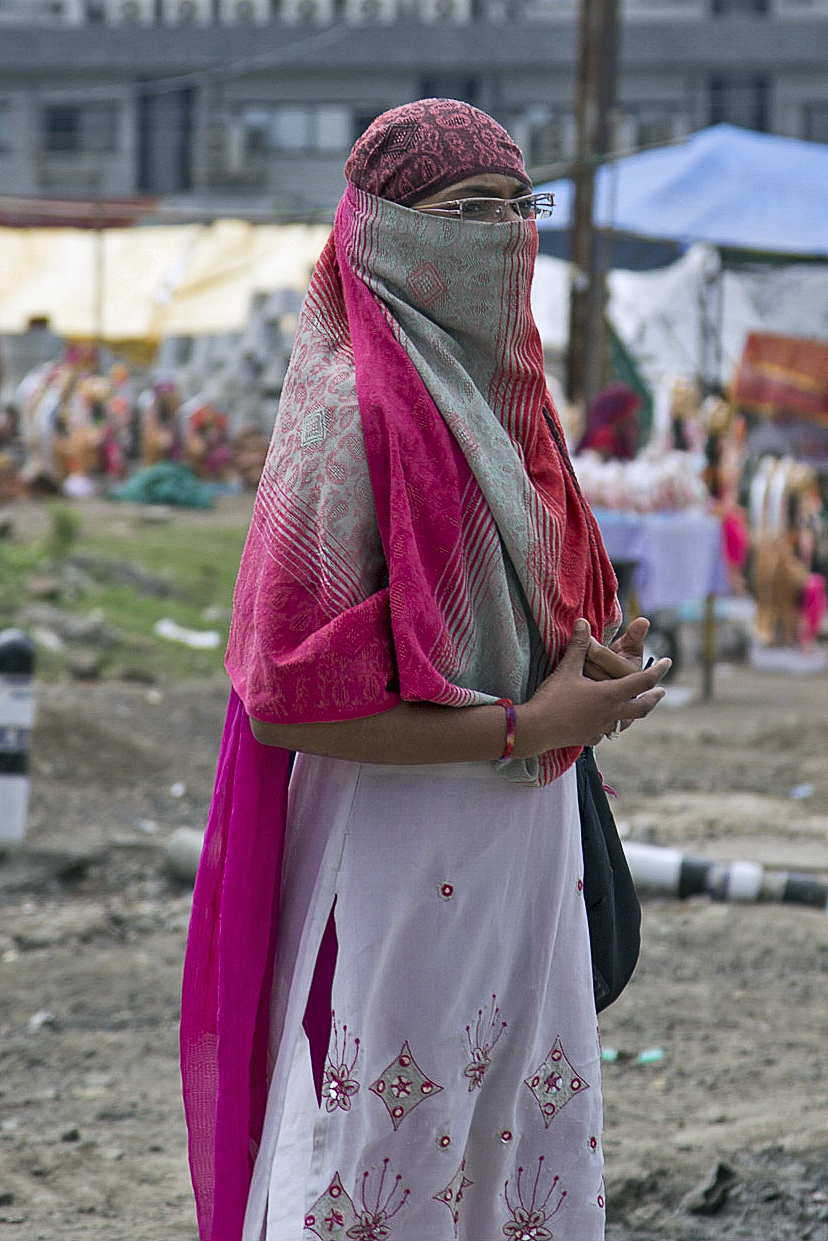
The dupatta's use as protection against dust or the sun

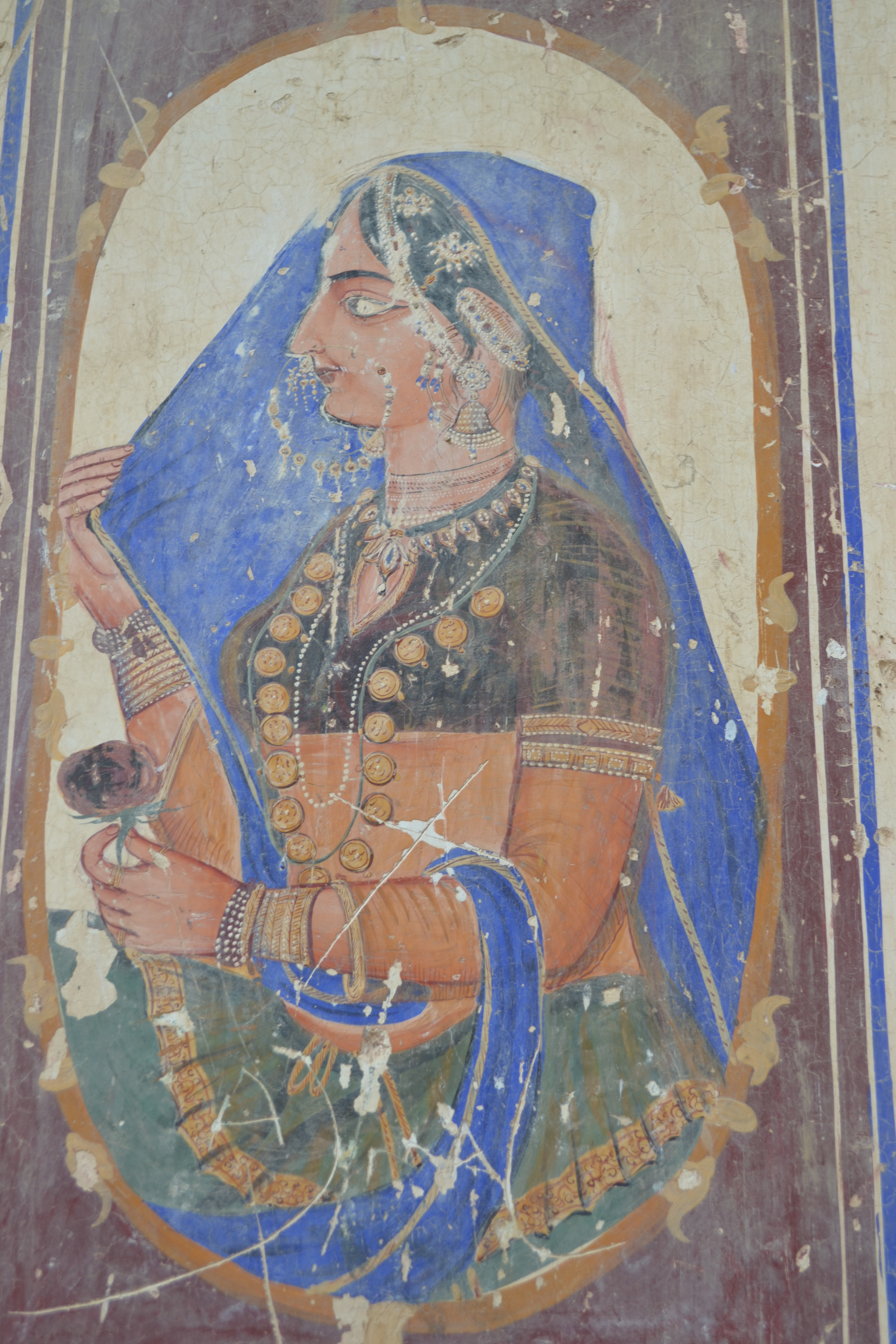
A Punjabi Sikh woman with blue chunni

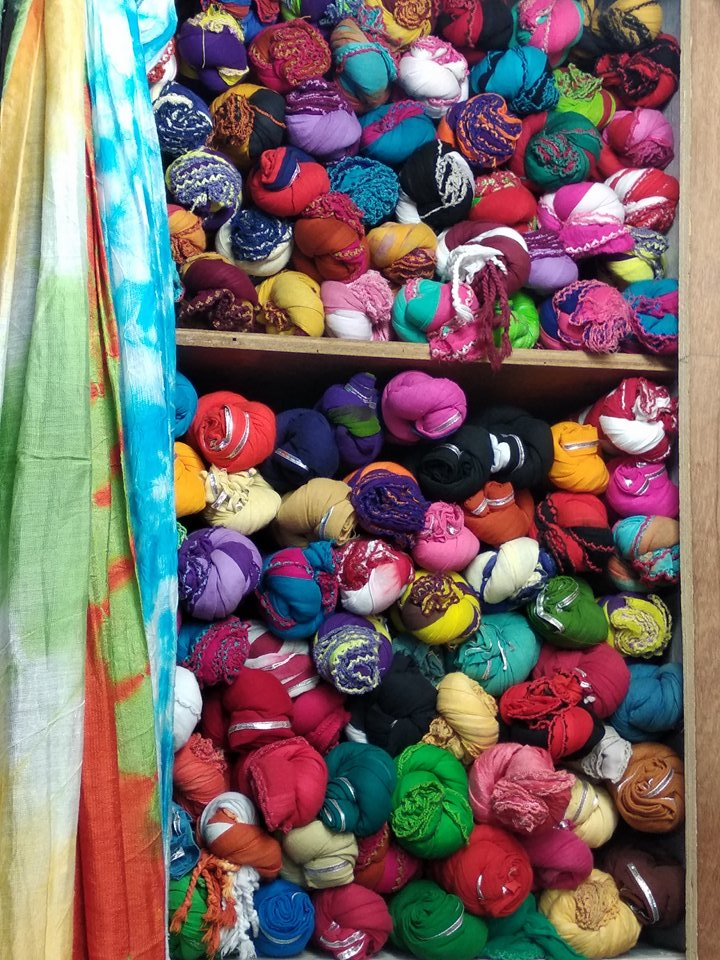
A dupatta shop in Dhaka, Bangladesh

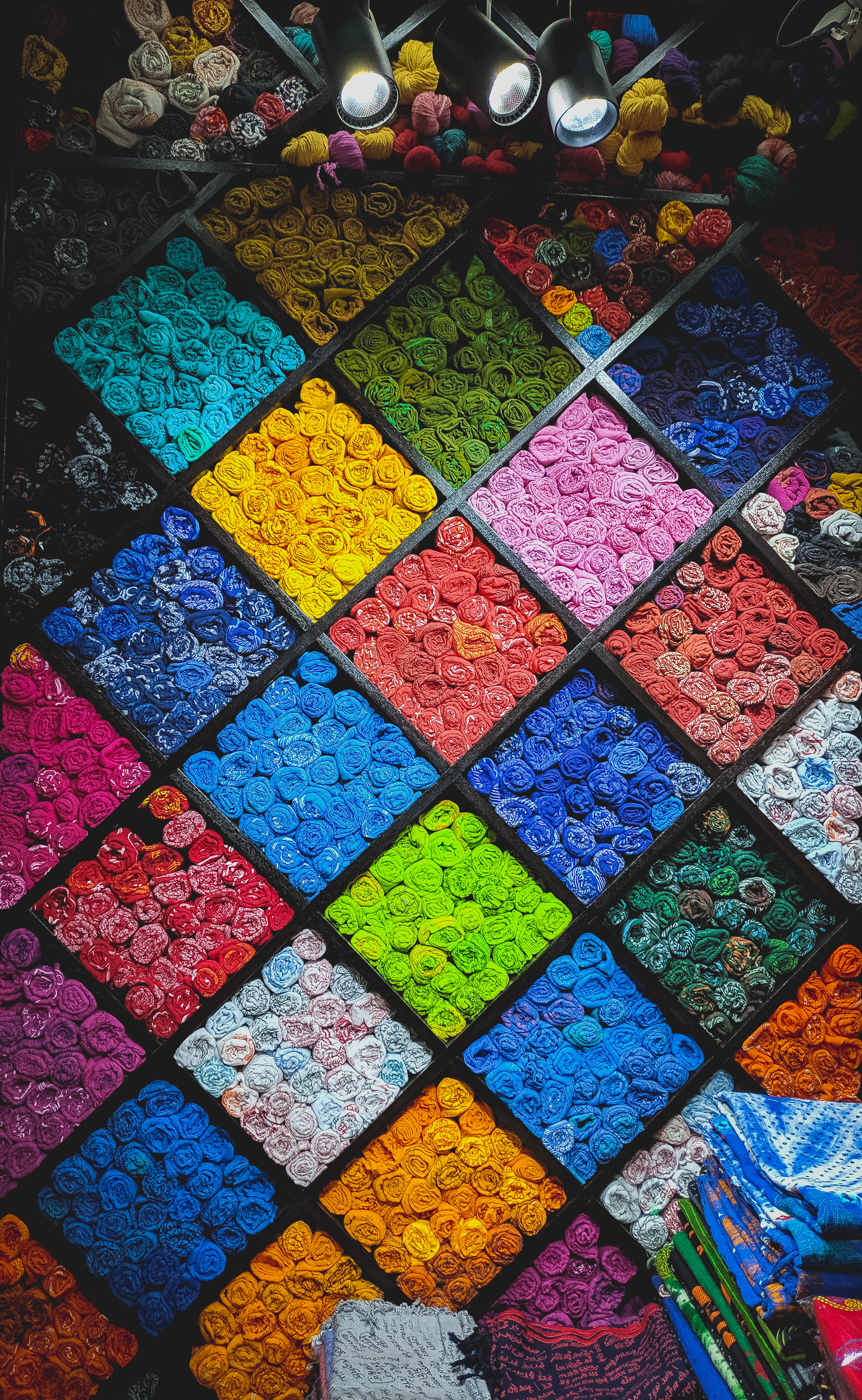
A dupatta shop in Dhaka, Bangladesh

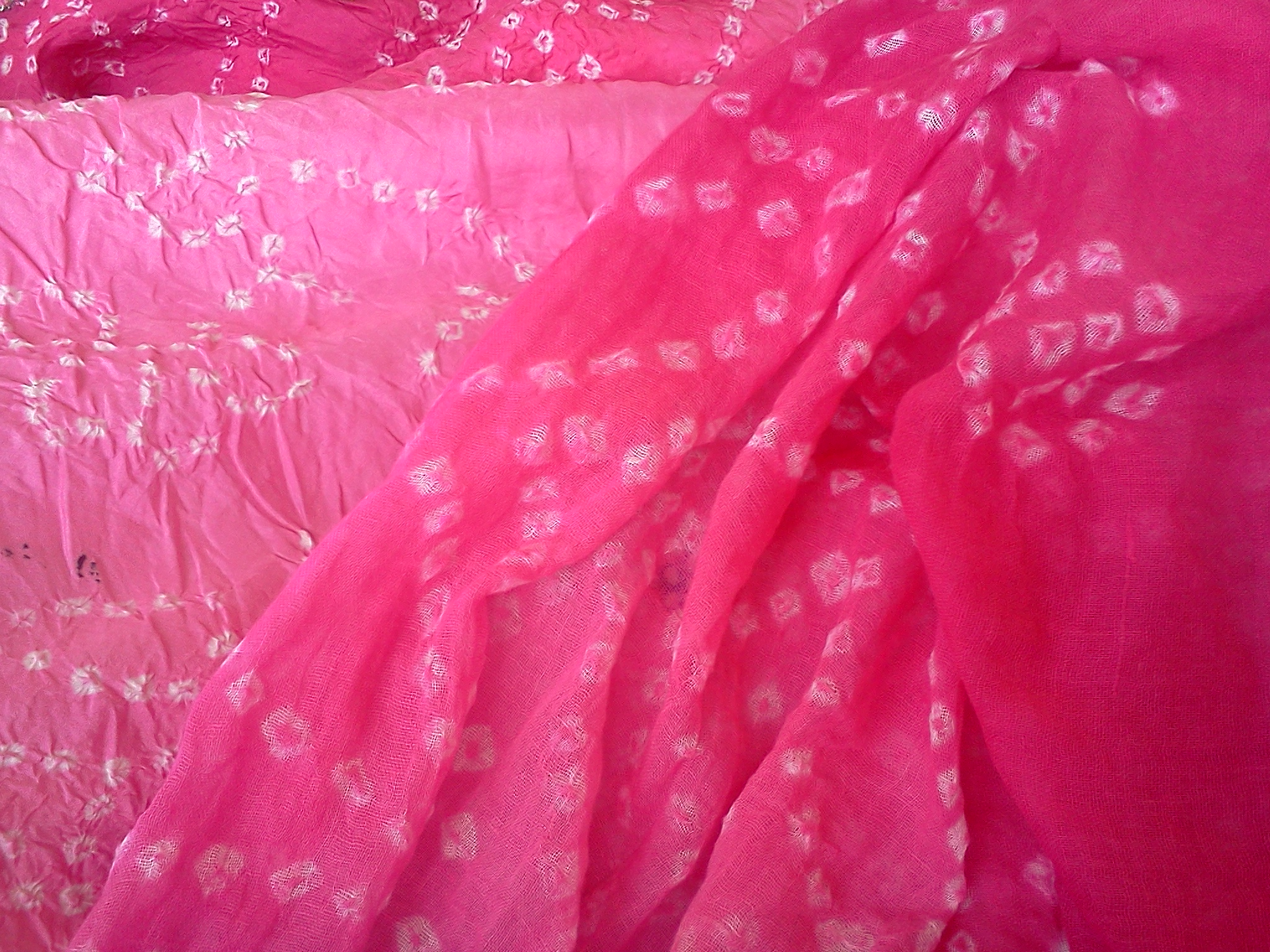
Bandhani dupatta

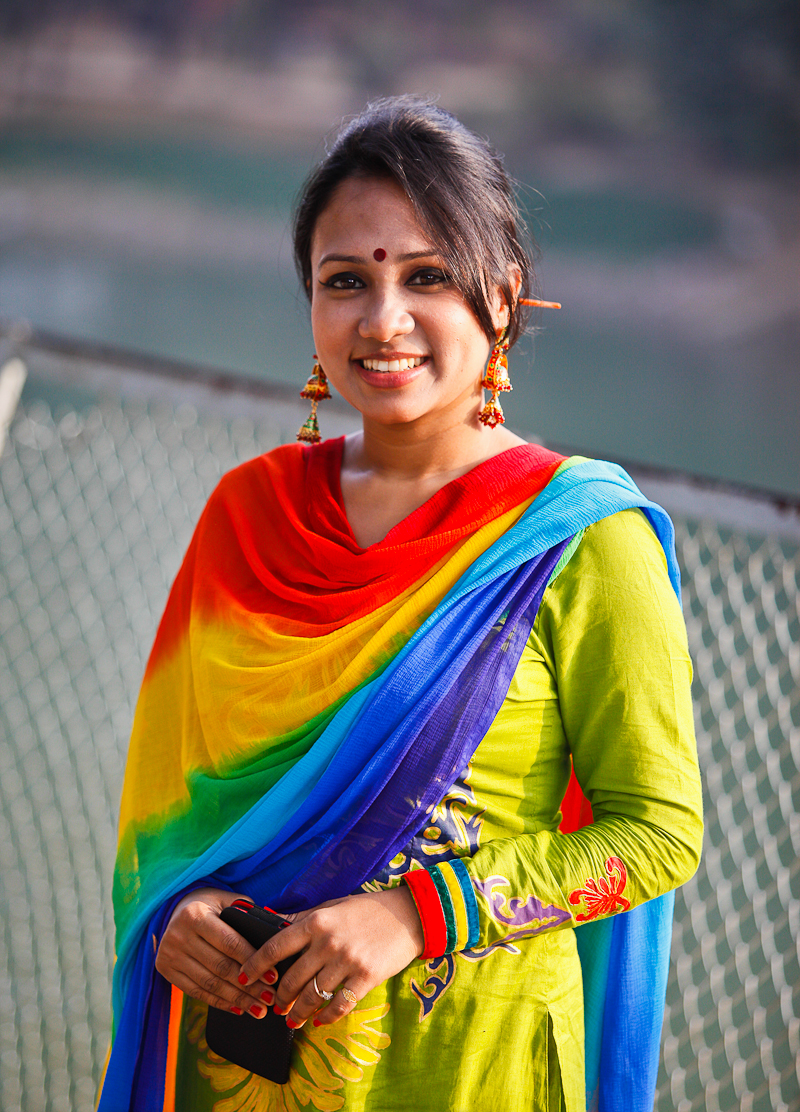
A Bangladeshi draped in dupatta

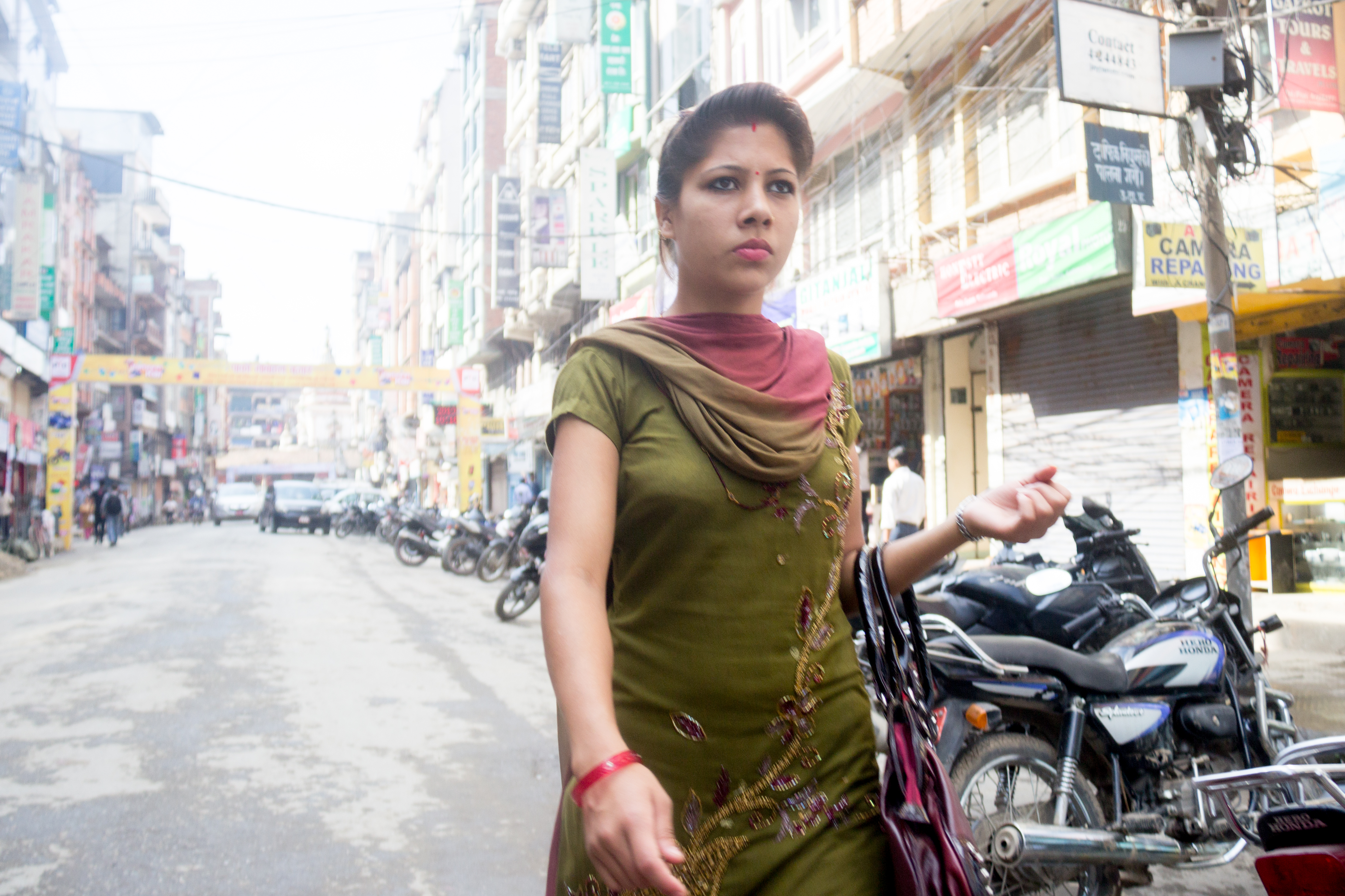
A Nepali in a modern style of draping dupatta over the neck

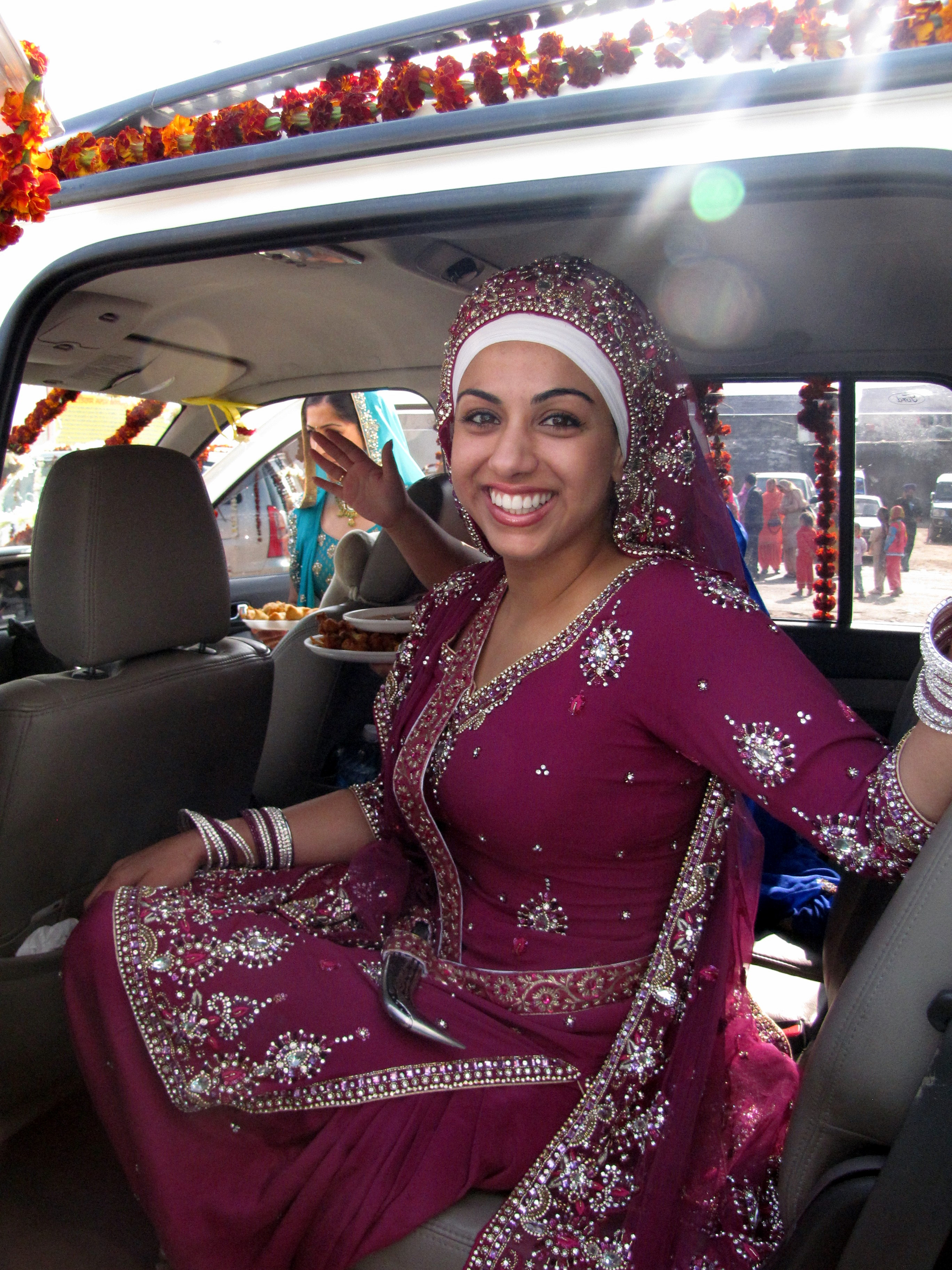
A Sikh in a salwar kameez

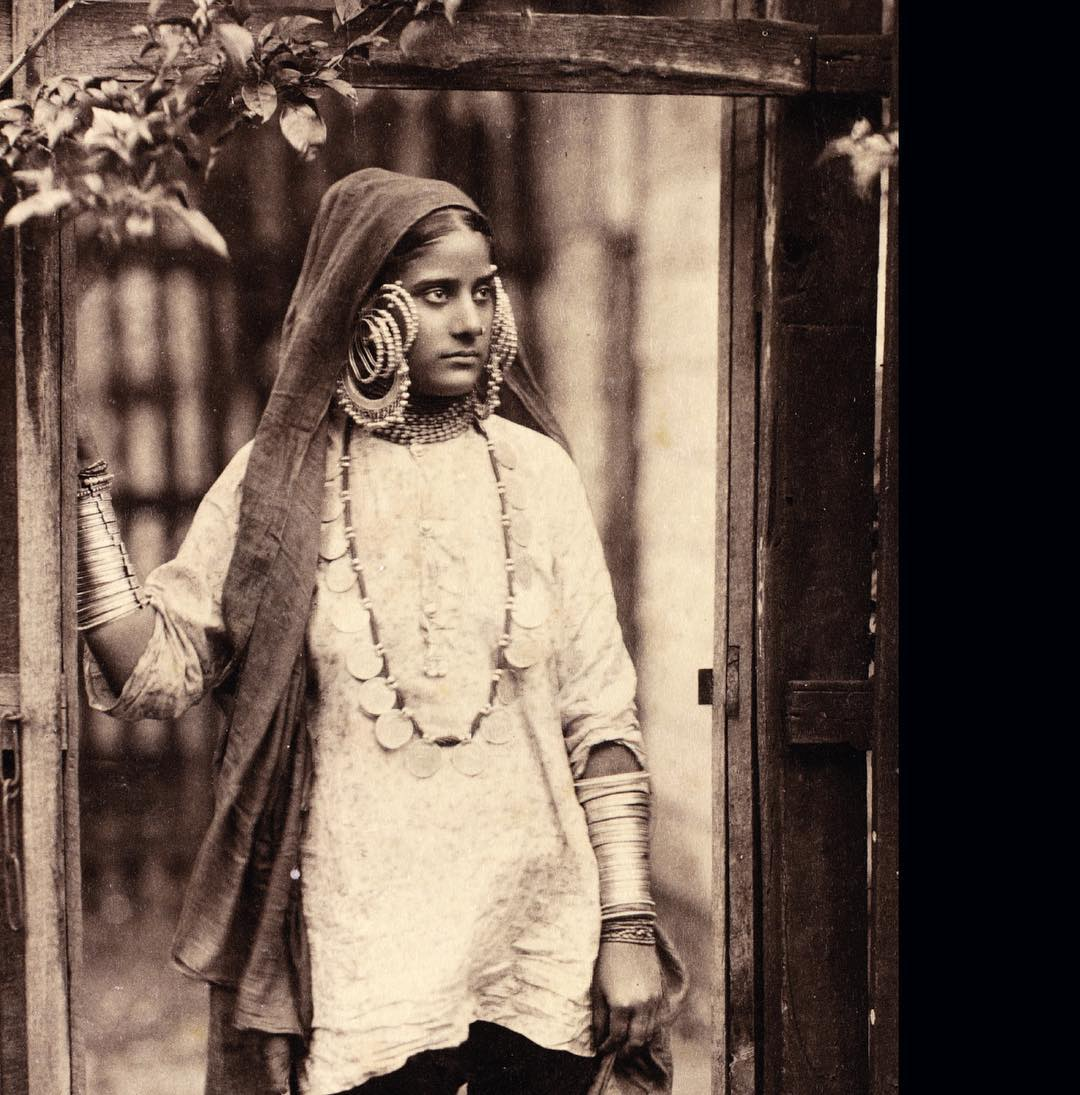
Detail of a photograph titled 'A Sikh Woman', Punjab, ca.1870's

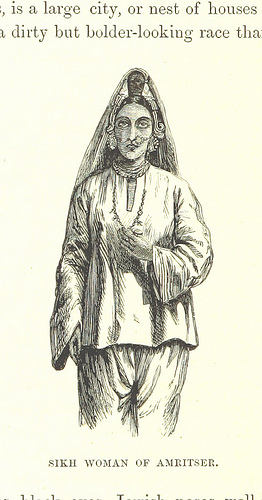
19th century Punjabi Sikh woman in Punjabi suthan and short kurta, wearing a dupatta

Mens Sherwani outfit with Dupatta

== See also ==
- Ghagra choli
