= Natural dye =

Dye extracted from plant or animal sources

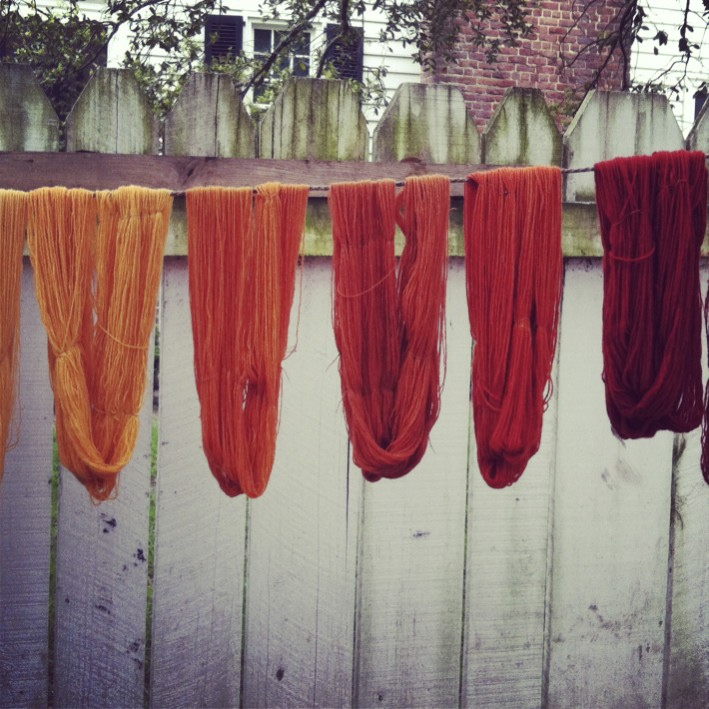
Naturally dyed skeins made with madder root, Colonial Williamsburg, VA

Natural dyes are dyes or colorants derived from plants, invertebrates, or minerals. The majority of natural dyes are vegetable dyes from plant sources—roots, berries, bark, leaves, and wood—and other biological sources such as fungi.

Archaeologists have found evidence of textile dyeing dating back to the Neolithic period. In China, dyeing with plants, barks and insects has been traced back more than 5,000 years. The essential process of dyeing changed little over time. Typically, the dye material is put in a pot of water and heated to extract the dye compounds into solution with the water. Then the textiles to be dyed are added to the pot, and held at heat until the desired color is achieved. Textile fibre may be dyed before spinning or weaving ("dyed in the wool"), after spinning ("yarn-dyed") or after weaving ("piece-dyed"). Many natural dyes require the use of substances called mordants to bind the dye to the textile fibres. Mordants (from Latin mordere 'to bite') are metal salts that can form a stable molecular coordination complex with both natural dyes and natural fibres. Historically, the most common mordants were alum (potassium aluminum sulfate—a metal salt of aluminum) and iron (ferrous sulfate). Many other metal salt mordants were also used, but are seldom used now due to modern research evidence of their extreme toxicity either to human health, ecological health, or both. These include salts of metals such as chrome, copper, tin, lead, and others. In addition, a number of non-metal salt substances can be used to assist with the molecular bonding of natural dyes to natural fibres—either on their own, or in combination with metal salt mordants—including tannin from oak galls and a range of other plants/plant parts, "pseudo-tannins", such as plant-derived oxalic acid, and ammonia from stale urine. Plants that bio-accumulate aluminum have also been used. Some mordants, and some dyes themselves, produce strong odors, and large-scale dyeworks were often isolated in their own districts.

Throughout history, people have dyed their textiles using common, locally available materials, but scarce dyestuffs that produced brilliant and permanent colors such as the natural invertebrate dyes Tyrian purple and crimson kermes became highly prized luxury items in the ancient and medieval world. A less expensive substitute for Tyrian purple was the purple/violet colored Folium also called Turnasole. Plant-based dyes such as woad (Isatis tinctoria), indigo, saffron, and madder were important trade goods in the economies of Asia, Africa and Europe. Dyes such as cochineal and logwood (Haematoxylum campechianum) were brought to Europe by the Spanish treasure fleets, and the dyestuffs of Europe were carried by colonists to America.

The discovery of man-made synthetic dyes in the mid-19th century triggered a long decline in the large-scale market for natural dyes. In the early 21st century, the market for natural dyes in the fashion industry is experiencing a resurgence. Western consumers have become more concerned about the health and environmental impact of synthetic dyes—which require the use of toxic fossil fuel byproducts for their production—in manufacturing and there is a growing demand for products that use natural dyes.

== Dyes in use in the fashion industry ==
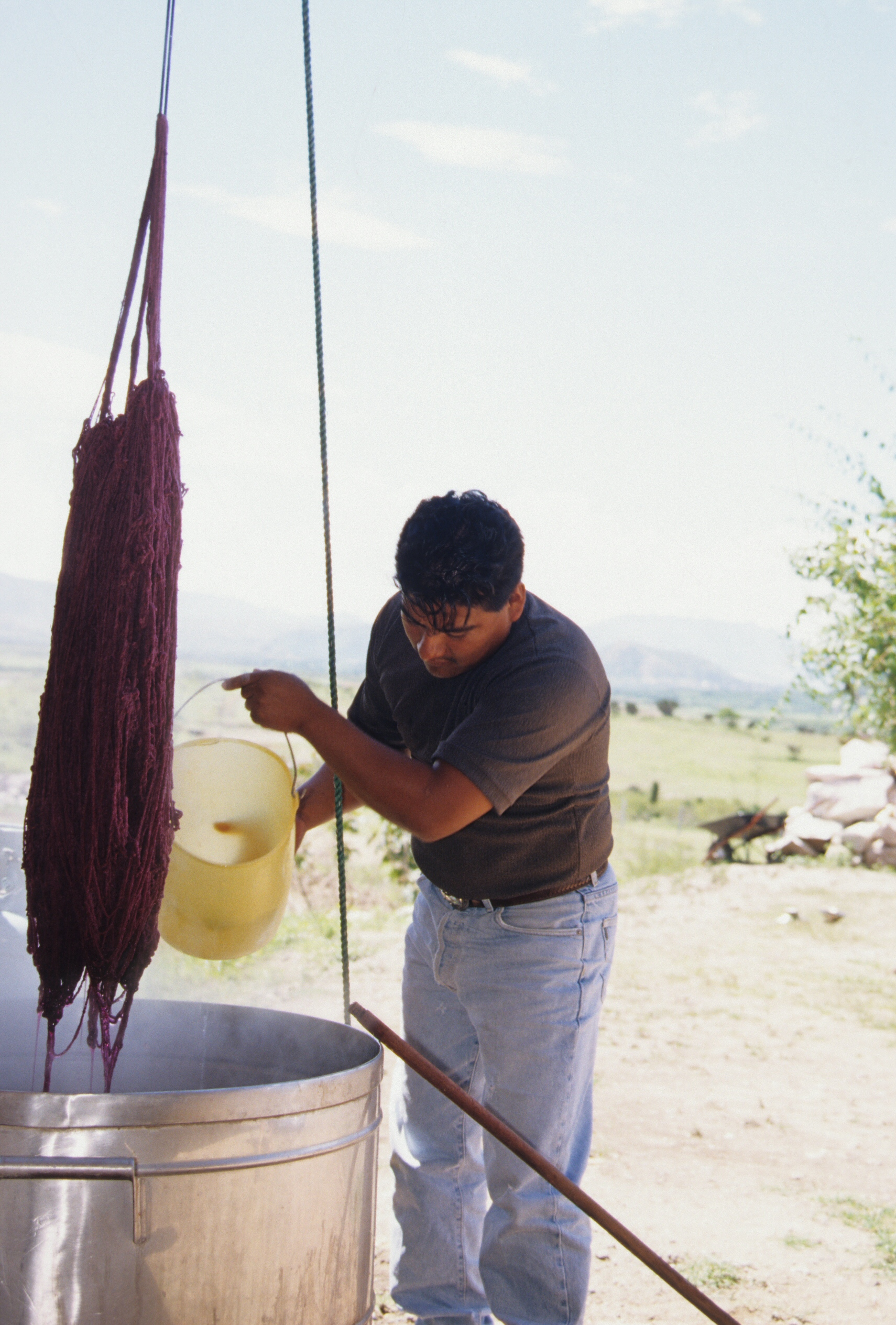
Oaxaca artisan Fidel Cruz Lazo dying yarn for rug making

Because of their different molecular structure, cellulose and protein fibres require different mordant treatments to prepare them for natural dyes.

- Cellulose fibres: cotton, linen, hemp, ramie, bamboo, rayon
- Protein fibres: wool, angora, mohair, cashmere, silk, soy, leather, suede

Cellulose fibres have a lower affinity for natural dyes than do protein fibres. The most common method for preparing cellulose fibres is to use a tannin first (tannins have high affinity for both protein and cellulose fibres), then use an aluminum salt. The most common method for preparing protein fibres is to use alum. However, the historic record contains many hundreds of different mordanting methods for both protein and cellulose fibres.

The types of natural dyes currently popular with craft dyers and the global fashion industry include:

=== Animal-derived dyes ===
- Cochineal insect (red)
- Cow urine (Indian yellow)
- Lac insect (red, violet)
- Murex snail (purple, indigo blue)
- Octopus/Cuttlefish (sepia brown)

=== Plant-derived dyes ===
- Avocado pits and skins (dusty pink)
- Black walnut or black walnut hulls (brown, black, source of tannin)
- Catechu or cutch tree (brown)
- Gamboge tree resin (dark mustard yellow)
- Chestnut hulls (peach to brown)
- Ebony leaves (black)
- Himalayan rhubarb root (bronze, yellow)
- Indigo leaves (blue to purple)
- Kamala seed pods (yellow)
- Katuray (red)
- Madder root (red, pink, orange)
- Mangosteen peel (green, brown, dark brown, purple, crimson)
- Narra wood (red)
- Myrobalan fruit (yellow, green, black, source of tannin)
- Noni roots (red)
- Pomegranate rind (yellow)
- Red cabbage (purple or blue)
- Sappanwood (red)
- Teak leaf (crimson to maroon)
- Sumac or staghorn sumac tree (brown, source of tannin)
- Turmeric roots (yellow)
- Weld herb (yellow)

== Origins ==
Colors in the "ruddy" range of reds, browns, and oranges are the first attested colors in a number of ancient textile sites ranging from the Neolithic to the Bronze Age across the Levant, Egypt, Mesopotamia and Europe, followed by evidence of blues and then yellows, with green appearing somewhat later. The earliest surviving evidence of textile dyeing was found at the large Neolithic settlement at Çatalhöyük in southern Anatolia, where traces of red dyes, possible from ochre (iron oxide pigments from clay), were found. Polychrome or multicolored fabrics seem to have been developed in the 3rd or 2nd millennium BCE. Textiles with a "red-brown warp and an ochre-yellow weft" were discovered in Egyptian pyramids of the Sixth Dynasty (2345–2180 BCE).

The chemical analysis that would definitively identify the dyes used in ancient textiles has rarely been conducted, and even when a dye such as indigo blue is detected it is impossible to determine which of several indigo-bearing plants was used. Nevertheless, based on the colors of surviving textile fragments and the evidence of actual dyestuffs found in archaeological sites, reds, blues, and yellows from plant sources were in common use by the late Bronze Age and Iron Age.

In the 18th century Jeremias Friedrich Gülich made substantial contributions to refining the dyeing process, making particular progress on setting standards on dyeing sheep wool and many other textiles. His contributions to refining the dyeing process and his theories on color brought much praise by the well known poet and artist Johann Wolfgang von Goethe.

== Processes ==
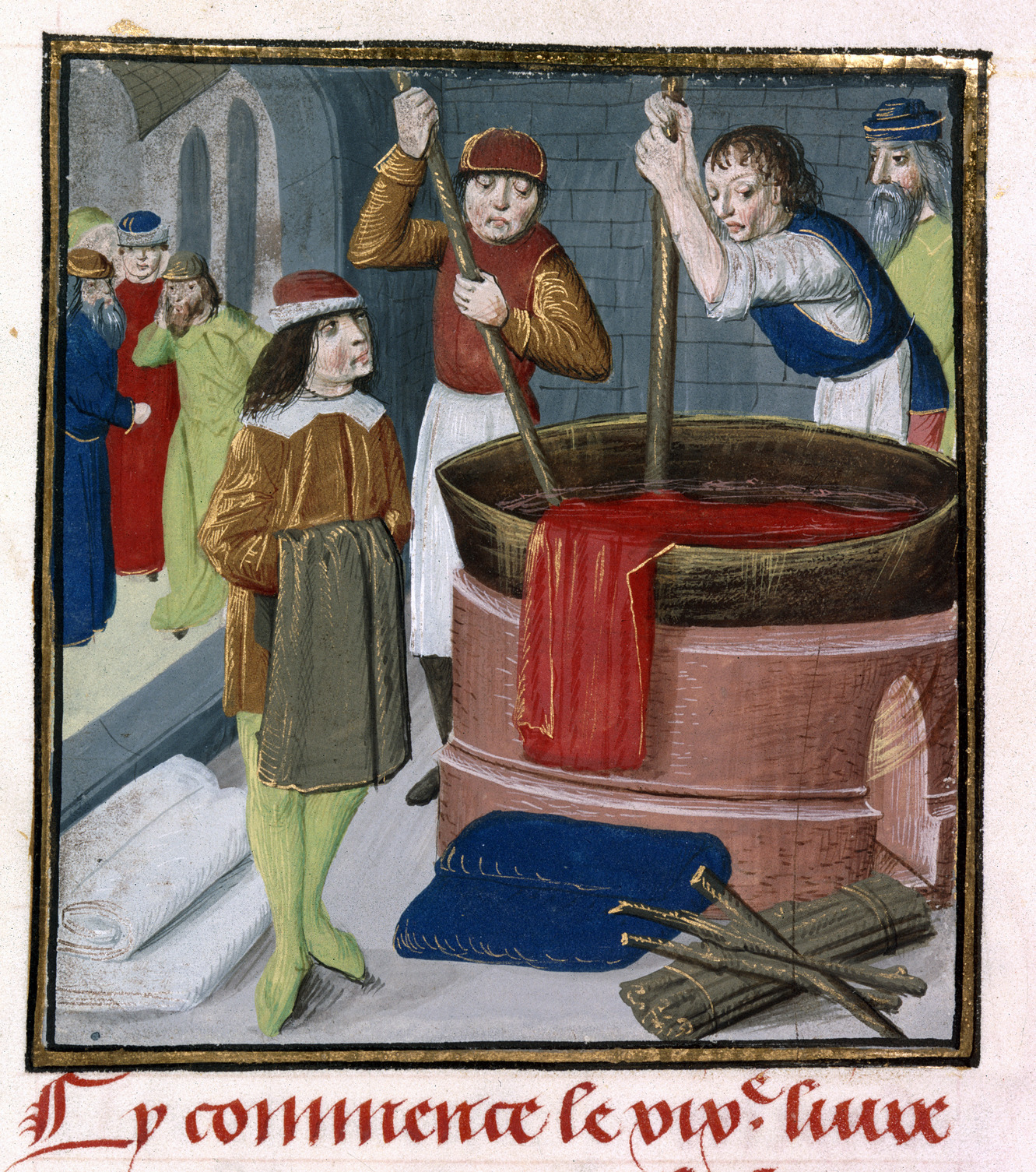
Dyeing wool cloth, 1482, from British Library Royal MS 15.E.iii, f. 269.

After mordanting, the essential process of dyeing requires soaking the material containing the dye (the dyestuff) in water, adding the textile to be dyed to the resulting solution (the dyebath), and bringing the solution to a simmer for an extended period, often measured in days or even weeks, stirring occasionally until the color has evenly transferred to the textiles.

Some dyestuffs, such as indigo and lichens, will give good color when used alone; these dyes are called direct dyes or substantive dyes. The majority of plant dyes, however, also require the use of a mordant, a chemical used to "fix" the color in the textile fibres. These dyes are called adjective dyes or "mordant dyes". By using different mordants, dyers can often obtain a variety of colors and shades from the same dye, as many mordants not only fix the natural dye compounds to the fibre, but can also modify the final dye color. Fibres or cloth may be pretreated with mordants (pre-mordant), or the mordant may be incorporated in the dyebath (meta-mordant, or co-mordant), or the mordanting may be done after dyeing (post-mordant).

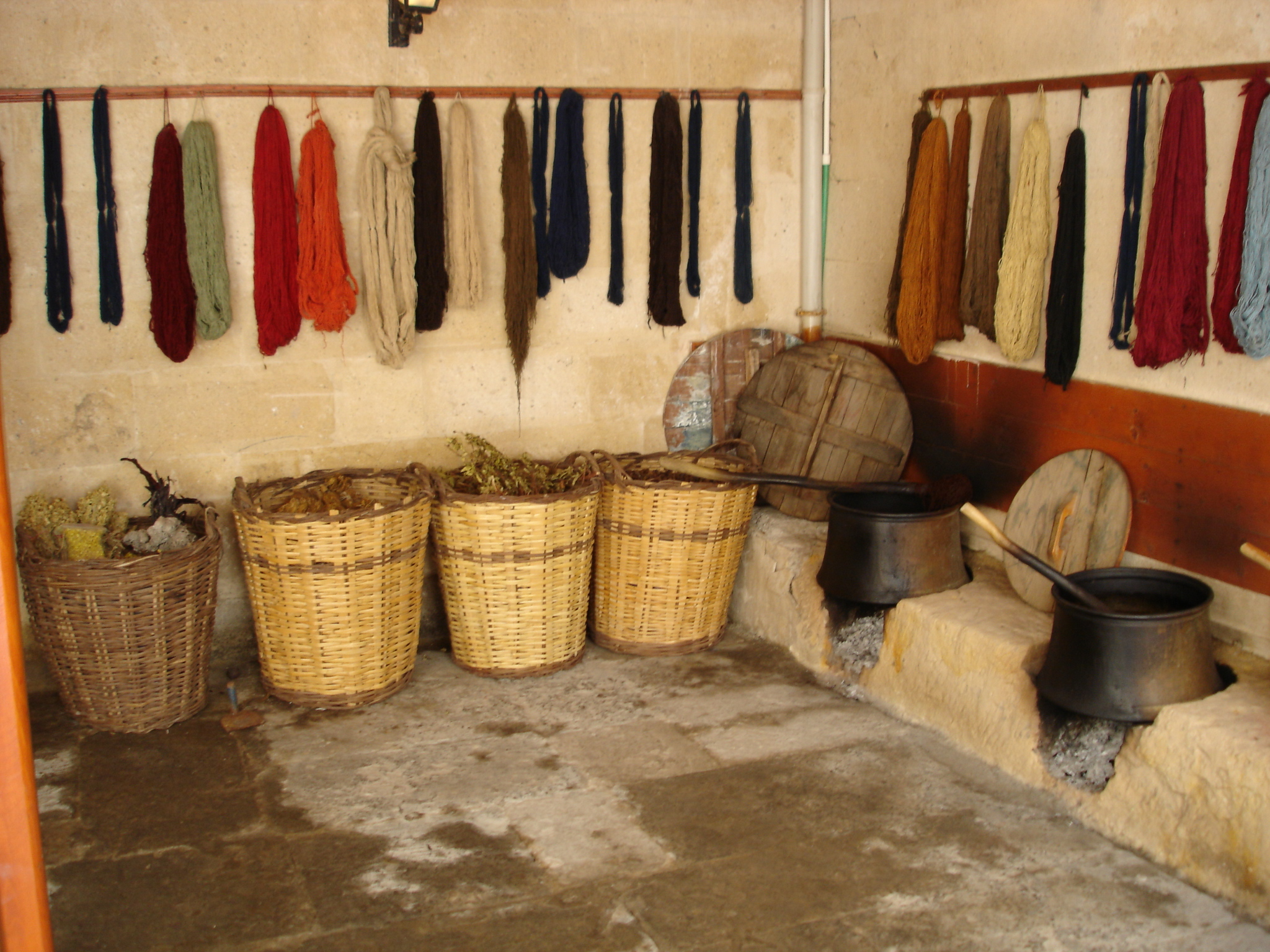
A dye-works with baskets of dyestuffs, skeins of dyed yarn, and heated vats for dyeing, in Odisha, India.

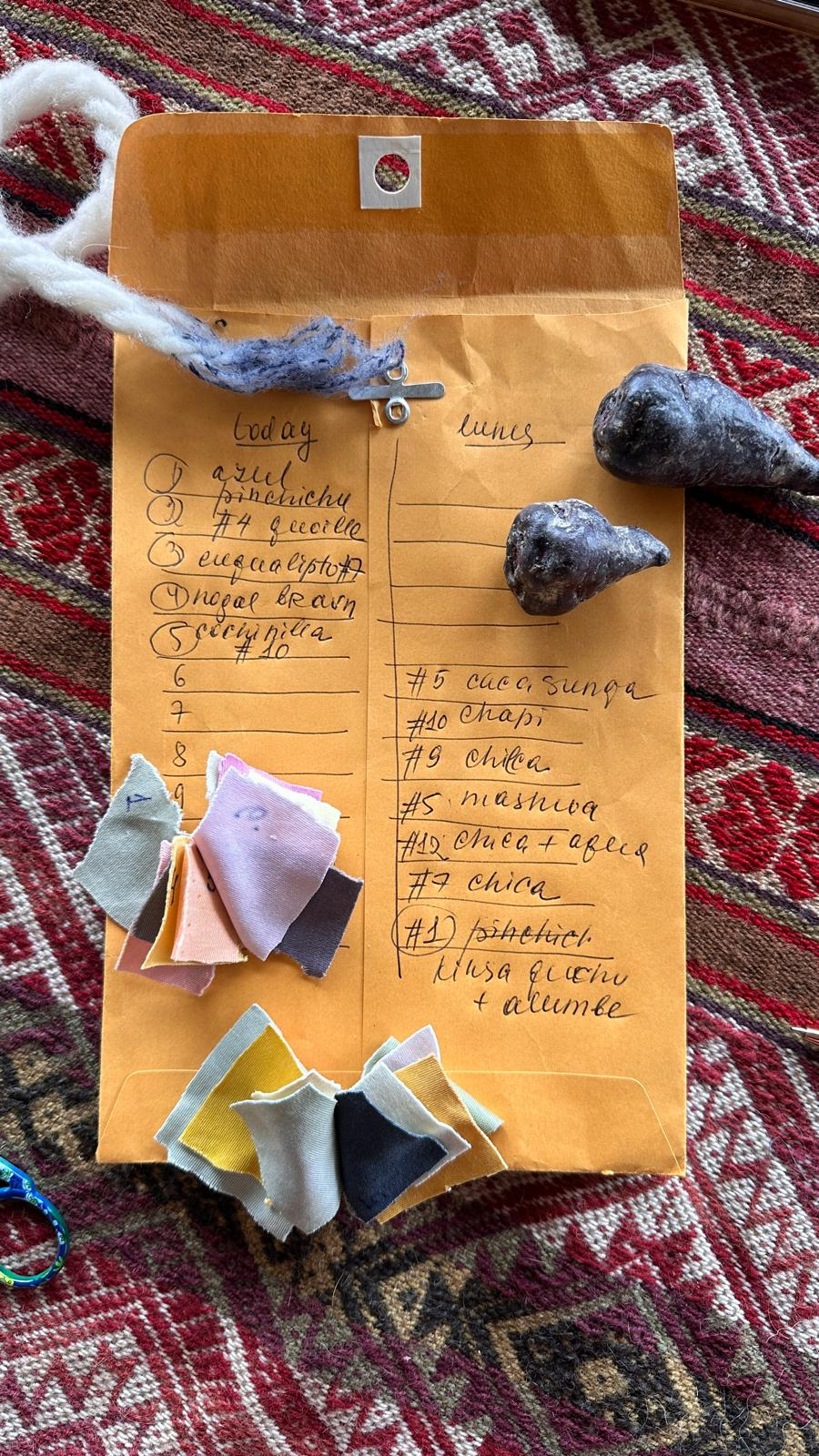
Natural plants for dyeing

Natural alum (aluminum sulfate) has been the most common metallic salt mordant for millennia (see Papyrus Graecus Holmiensis, mordant and dye recipes start at recipe #84), but tin (stannous chloride), copper (cupric sulfate), iron (ferrous sulfate, called copperas) and chrome (potassium dichromate) are also used. Iron mordants "sadden" colors, while alum and tin mordants brighten colors. Iron, chrome and tin mordants contribute to fabric deterioration, referred to as "dye rot". Additional modifiers may be used during or after dyeing to protect fibre structure, shift pH to achieve different color results, or for any number of other desirably outcomes. Metal-salt accumulating plants (including club mosses) were also commonly used as mordants in parts of Europe, but are now endangered in many areas. The Symplocos genus of plants, which grows in semi-tropical regions, also bioaccumulates aluminum, and is still popular with natural dyers.

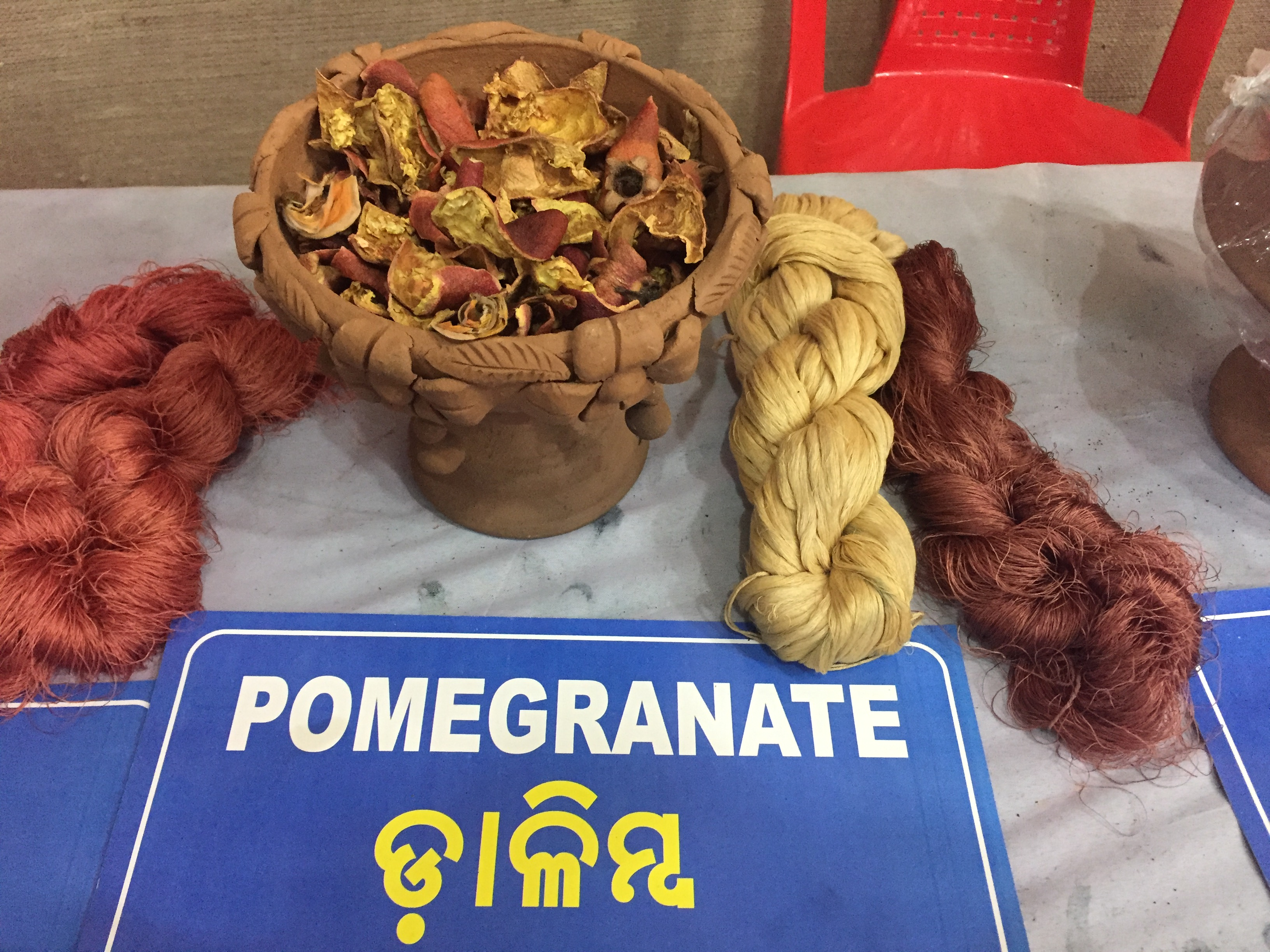
Using natural dyes to color the yarn of Tasar silk.

Across Asia and Africa and the Americas, patterned fabrics were produced using resist dyeing techniques to control the absorption of color in piece-dyed cloth. In China, Japan, India, Pakistan, Nigeria, Gambia, and other parts of West Africa and southeast Asia, patterned silk and cotton fabrics were produced using techniques in which the cloth is printed or stenciled with starch or wax, or tied in various ways to prevent even penetration of the dye when the cloth is piece-dyed. The Chinese ladao process is dated to the 10th century; other traditional techniques include tie-dye, batik, Rōketsuzome, katazome, bandhani and leheria.

Some mordants and some dyestuffs produce strong odours, and the process of dyeing often depends on a good supply of fresh water, storage areas for bulky plant materials, vats which can be kept heated (often for days or weeks) along with the necessary fuel, and airy spaces to dry the dyed textiles. Ancient large-scale dye-works tended to be located on the outskirts of populated areas.

== Common dyestuffs ==
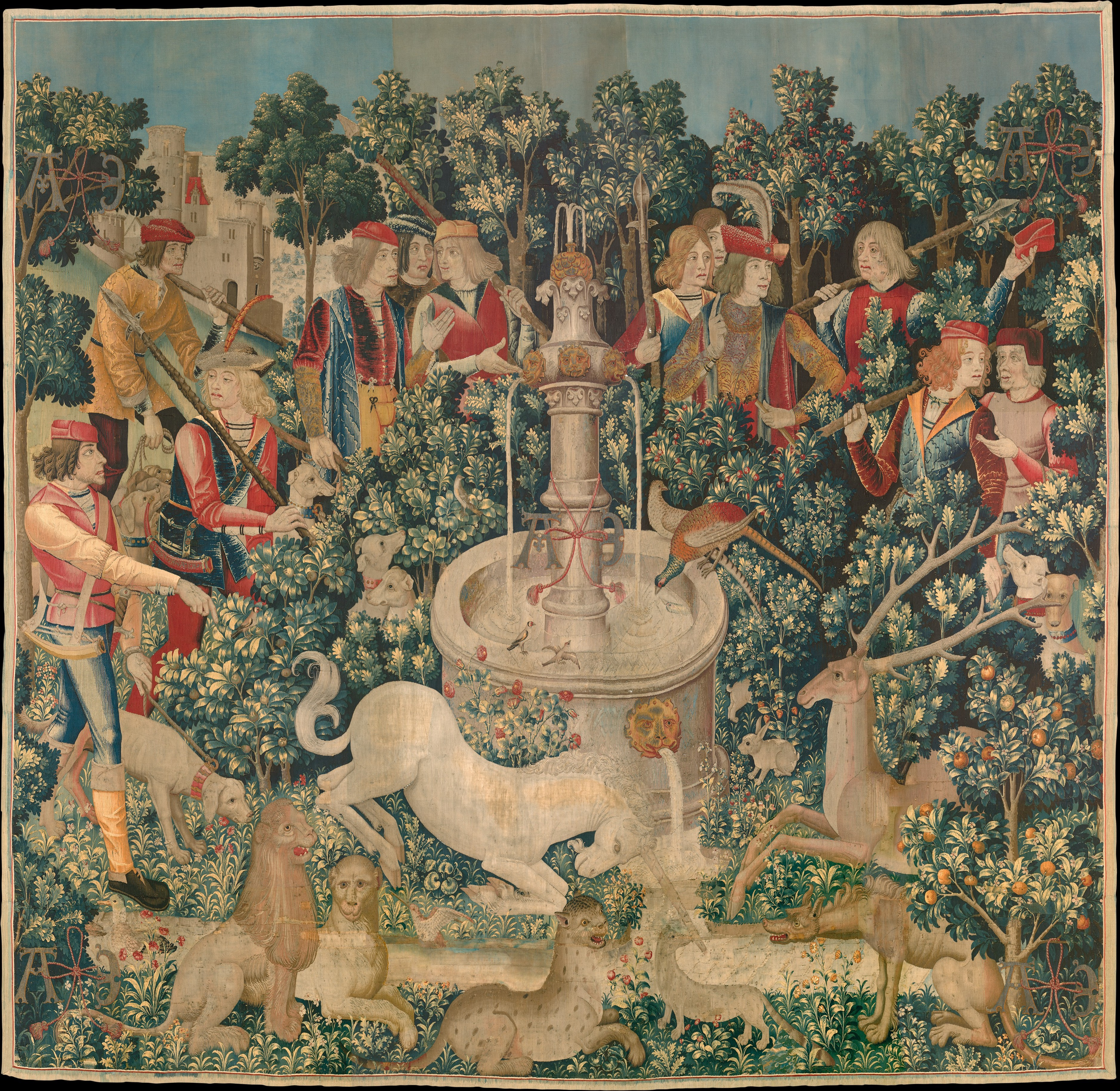
The Hunt of the Unicorn Tapestry, dyed with weld (yellow), madder (red), and woad (blue).

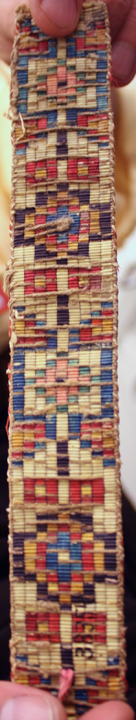
Reverse side of loomed quillwork collected from an Upper Missouri tribe by the Lewis and Clark Expedition, pre-1804. All natural dyes. Collection of the University of Pennsylvania Museum

=== Reds and pinks ===
A variety of plants produce red (or reddish) dyes, including a number of lichens, henna, alkanet or dyer's bugloss (Alkanna tinctoria), asafoetida, sappanwood, various galium species, and dyer's madder Rubia tinctorum and Rubia cordifolia. Madder and related plants of the genus Rubia are native to many temperate zones around the world, and were already used as sources of good red dye in prehistory. Madder has been identified on linen in the tomb of Tutankhamun, and Pliny the Elder records madder growing near Rome. Madder was a dye of commercial importance in Europe, being cultivated in the Netherlands and France to dye the red coats of military uniforms until the market collapsed following the development of synthetic alizarin dye in 1869. Madder was also used to dye the "hunting pinks" of Great Britain.

Turkey red was a strong, very fast red dye for cotton obtained from madder root via a complicated multistep process involving "sumac and oak galls, calf's blood, sheep's dung, oil, soda, alum, and a solution of tin". Turkey red was developed in India and spread to Turkey. Greek workers familiar with the methods of its production were brought to France in 1747, and Dutch and English spies soon discovered the secret. A sanitized version of Turkey red was being produced in Manchester by 1784, and roller-printed dress cottons with a Turkey red ground were fashionable in England by the 1820s.

Munjeet or Indian madder (Rubia cordifolia) is native to the Himalayas and other mountains of Asia and Japan. Munjeet was an important dye for the Asian cotton industry and is still used by craft dyers in Nepal.

In tropical Asia, a red dye is obtained from sappanwood (Biancaea sappan). In Malaysia and Laos, a red to purple dye is produced from the root of the Indian mulberry (Morinda tinctoria). In the Philippines, red dye was obtained from noni (Morinda citrifolia) roots, sapang (sappanwood), katuray (Sesbania grandiflora), and narra wood (Pterocarpus spp.), among other plants.

Puccoon or bloodroot (Sanguinaria canadensis) is a popular red dye among Southeastern Native American basketweavers. Choctaw basketweavers additionally use sumac for red dye. Coushattas artists from Texas and Louisiana used the water oak (Quercus nigra L.) to produce red.

A delicate rose color in Navajo rugs comes from fermented prickly pear cactus fruit, Opuntia polyacantha. Navajo weavers also use rainwater and red dirt to create salmon-pink dyes.

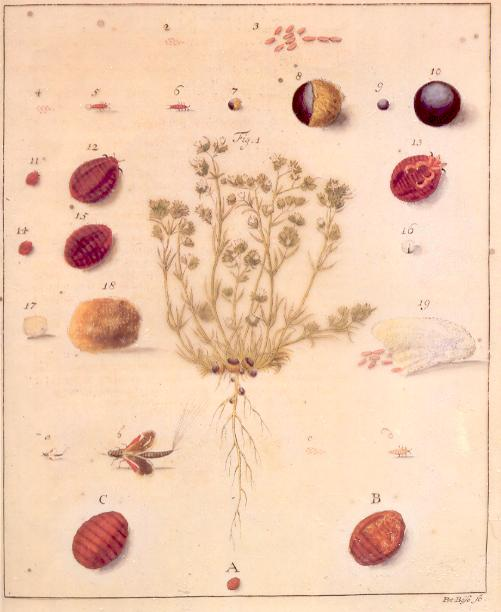
A diagram of the life cycle of a Polish Cochineal.

==== Technique ====
In Japan, dyers have mastered the technique of producing a bright red to orange-red dye (known as carthamin) from the dried florets of safflower (Carthamus tinctorius). A bath solution of cold water is first prepared, to which is added the collected flowers. Steeping in cold water releases a yellow pigment (colorant) which, after straining, is discarded. After pressing and drying once again the red petals, the petals are re-hydrated again, at which time alkali made from the burnt ash of Chenopodium album var. centrorubrum is added to release the red colorant. The batch is then kneaded with one's hands and strained. Vinegar is then added to the solution, and the colorant is soaked up by using strips of linen. The strips of linen (now red) are then placed in a separate container and alkali obtained from the burnt ash of Chenopodium album var. centrorubrum is added once more to release the red absorbed by the linen. The solution obtained is then poured into a separate container. An extract made from plums that have been covered with soot and fumigated in a smoking pit for 24 hours, followed by a drying period of one month in the sun, is then used as a color fixing mordant. The dried plums are steeped in water and mixed with the color pigment, causing the colorant to precipitate onto a piece of silk or any other desired material. The colorant at this stage has the consistency of fine, red mud. Color used as a dye can be diluted. 1.5 kilograms (3.3 lb) of dried florets produces enough dye pigment to dye a small piece of fabric. The dye color is fixed in the fabric with a mordant. Darker shades are achieved by repeating the dyeing process several times, having the fabric dry, and redyed.

=== Oranges ===
Dyes that create reds and yellows can also yield oranges. Navajo dyers create orange dyes from one-seeded juniper, Juniperus monosperma, Navajo tea, Thelesperma gracile, or alder bark.

=== Yellows ===
Yellow dyes are "about as numerous as red ones", and can be extracted from saffron, pomegranate rind, turmeric, safflower, onion skins, and a number of weedy flowering plants. Limited evidence suggests the use of weld (Reseda luteola), also called mignonette or dyer's rocket before the Iron Age, but it was an important dye of the ancient Mediterranean and Europe and is indigenous to England. Two brilliant yellow dyes of commercial importance in Europe from the 18th century are derived from trees of the Americas: quercitron from the inner bark of Eastern Black Oak (Quercus velutina), native to eastern North America and fustic from the dyer's mulberry tree (Maclura tinctoria) of the West Indies and Mexico.

In rivercane basketweaving among Southeastern Woodlands tribes in the Americas, butternut (Juglans cinerea) and yellow root (Xanthorhiza simplicissima) provide a rich yellow color. Chitimacha basket weavers have a complex formula for yellow that employs a dock plant (most likely Rumex crispus) for yellow. Navajo artists create yellow dyes from small snake-weed, brown onion skins, and rubber plant (Parthenium incanum). Rabbitbush (Chrysothamnus) and rose hips produce pale, yellow-cream colored dyes.

=== Greens ===
If plants that yield yellow dyes are common, plants that yield green dyes are rare. Both woad and indigo have been used since ancient times in combination with yellow dyes to produce shades of green. Medieval and Early Modern England was especially known for its green dyes. The dyers of Lincoln, a great cloth town in the high Middle Ages, produced the Lincoln green cloth associated with Robin Hood by dyeing wool with woad and then overdyeing it yellow with weld or dyer's greenweed (Genista tinctoria), also known as dyer's broom. Woolen cloth mordanted with alum and dyed yellow with dyer's greenweed was overdyed with woad and, later, indigo, to produce the once-famous Kendal green. This in turn fell out of fashion in the 18th century in favor of the brighter Saxon green, dyed with indigo and fustic.

Soft olive greens are also achieved when textiles dyed yellow are treated with an iron mordant. The dull green cloth common to the Iron Age Halstatt culture shows traces of iron, and was possibly colored by boiling yellow-dyed cloth in an iron pot. Indigenous peoples of the Northwest Plateau in North America used lichen to dye corn husk bags a sea green.

Navajo textile artist Nonabah Gorman Bryan developed a two-step process for creating green dye. First the Churro wool yarn is dyed yellow with sagebrush, Artemisia tridentata, and then it is soaked in black dye afterbath. Red onion skins are also used by Navajo dyers to produce green.

=== Blues ===
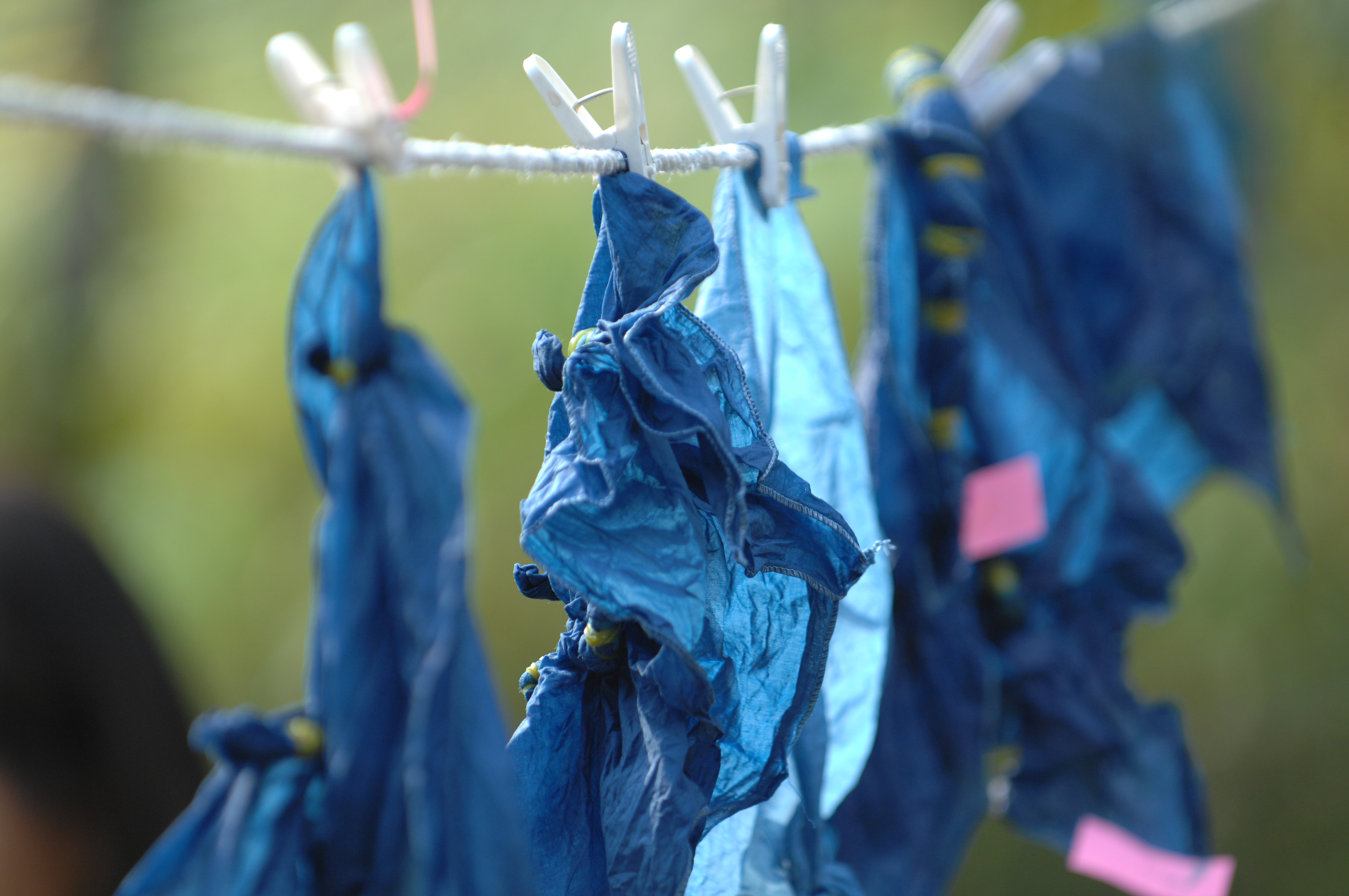
Traditional natural dyeing (Korean blue – Persicaria tinctoria)

Blue colorants around the world were derived from indigo dye-bearing plants, primarily those in the genus Indigofera, which are native to the tropics. The primary commercial indigo species in Asia was true indigo (Indigofera tinctoria). India is believed to be the oldest center of indigo dyeing in the Old World. It was a primary supplier of indigo dye to Europe as early as the Greco-Roman era. The association of India with indigo is reflected in the Greek word for the dye, which was indikon (ινδικόν). The Romans used the term indicum, which passed into Italian dialect and eventually into English as the word indigo.

In the Philippines, blue to indigo colors were also obtained from Indigofera tinctoria and related species, known under common names including tarum, dagum, tayum.

In Central and South America, the important blue dyes were Añil (Indigofera suffruticosa) and Natal indigo (Indigofera arrecta).

In temperate climates including Europe, indigo was obtained primarily from woad (Isatis tinctoria), an indigenous plant of Assyria and the Levant which has been grown in Northern Europe over 2,000 years, although from the 18th century it was mostly replaced by superior Indian indigo imported by the British East India Company. Woad was carried to New England in the 17th century and used extensively in America until native stands of indigo were discovered in Florida and the Carolinas. In Sumatra, indigo dye is extracted from some species of Marsdenia. Other indigo-bearing dye plants include dyer's knotweed (Polygonum tinctorum) from Japan and the coasts of China, and the West African shrub Lonchocarpus cyanescens. The cultivation of indigo was swiftly displaced by synthetic indigo.

==== Examples of dyeing with indigo ====
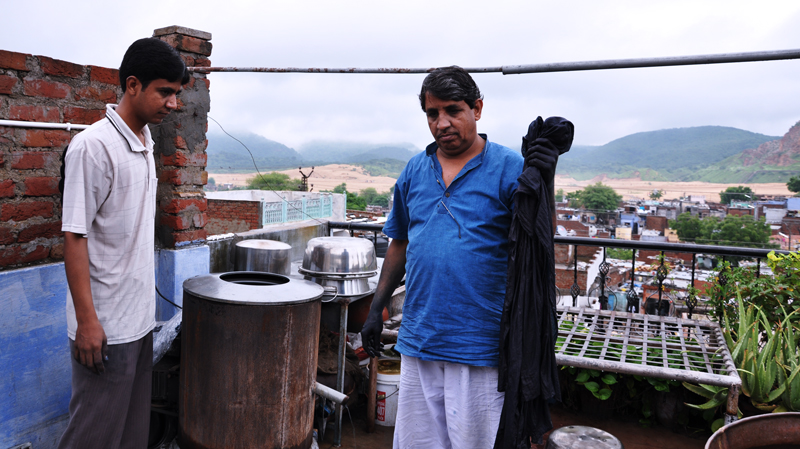
A traditional dyer from Jaipur, India

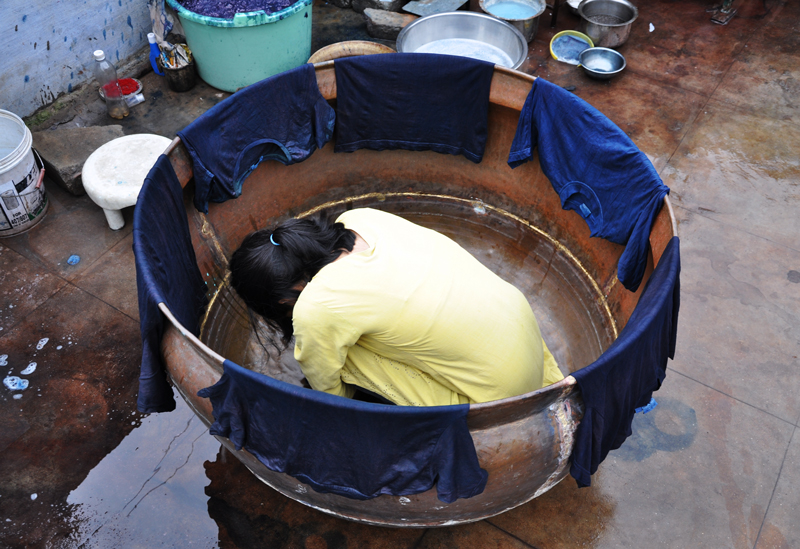
A traditional brass container used to dye cloth in quantity

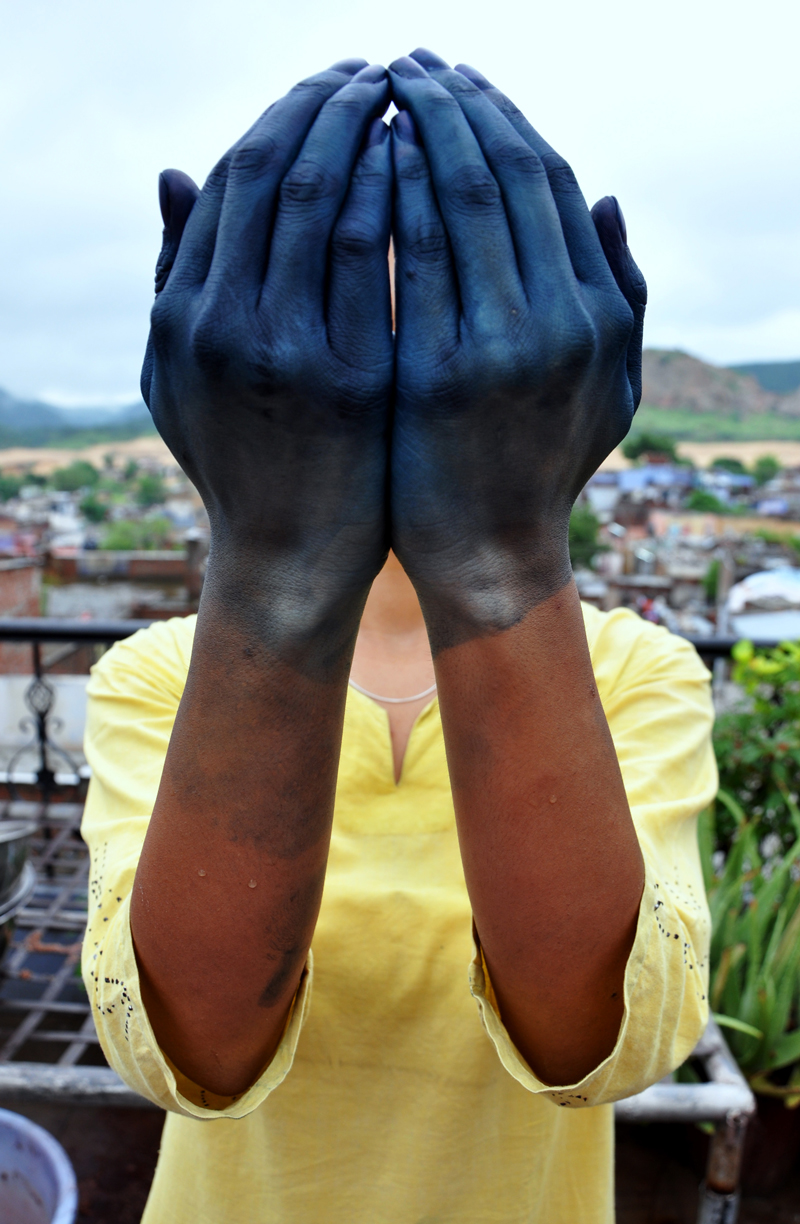
Hands stained with indigo

=== Purples ===
In medieval Europe, purple, violet, murrey and similar colors were produced by dyeing wool with woad or indigo in the fleece and then piece-dyeing the woven cloth with red dyes, either the common madder or the luxury dyes kermes and cochineal. Madder could also produce purples when used with alum. Brazilwood also gave purple shades with vitriol (sulfuric acid) or potash. In China, purple root/gromwell (Lithospermum purpurocaeruleum) has been used to produce a purple dye.

Choctaw artists traditionally used maple (Acer sp.) to create lavender and purple dyes. Purples can also be derived from lichens, and from the berries of White Bryony from the northern Rocky Mountain states and mulberry (morus nigra) (with an acid mordant).

=== Browns ===
Cutch is an ancient brown dye from the wood of acacia trees, particularly Acacia catechu, used in India for dyeing cotton. Cutch gives gray-browns with an iron mordant and olive-browns with copper.

Black walnut (Juglans nigra) is used by Cherokee artists to produce a deep brown approaching black. Today black walnut is primarily used to dye baskets but has been used in the past for fabrics and deerhide. Juniper, Juniperus monosperma, ashes provide brown and yellow dyes for Navajo people, as do the hulls of wild walnuts (Juglans major). Khaki, which translates a Hindustani word signifying "soil-colored", was introduced into British uniforms in India, which were dyed locally with a dye prepared from the native mazari palm Nannorrhops.

=== Grays and blacks ===
Choctaw dyers use maple (Acer sp.) for a grey dye. Navajo weavers create black from mineral yellow ochre mixed with pitch from the piñon tree(Pinus edulis) and the three-leaved sumac (Rhus trilobata). They also produce a cool gray dye with blue flower lupine and a warm gray from Juniper mistletoe (Phoradendron juniperinum).

In the Philippines, black dye was obtained from ebony (knalum or batulinao) leaves, as well as from indigo.

=== Lichen ===
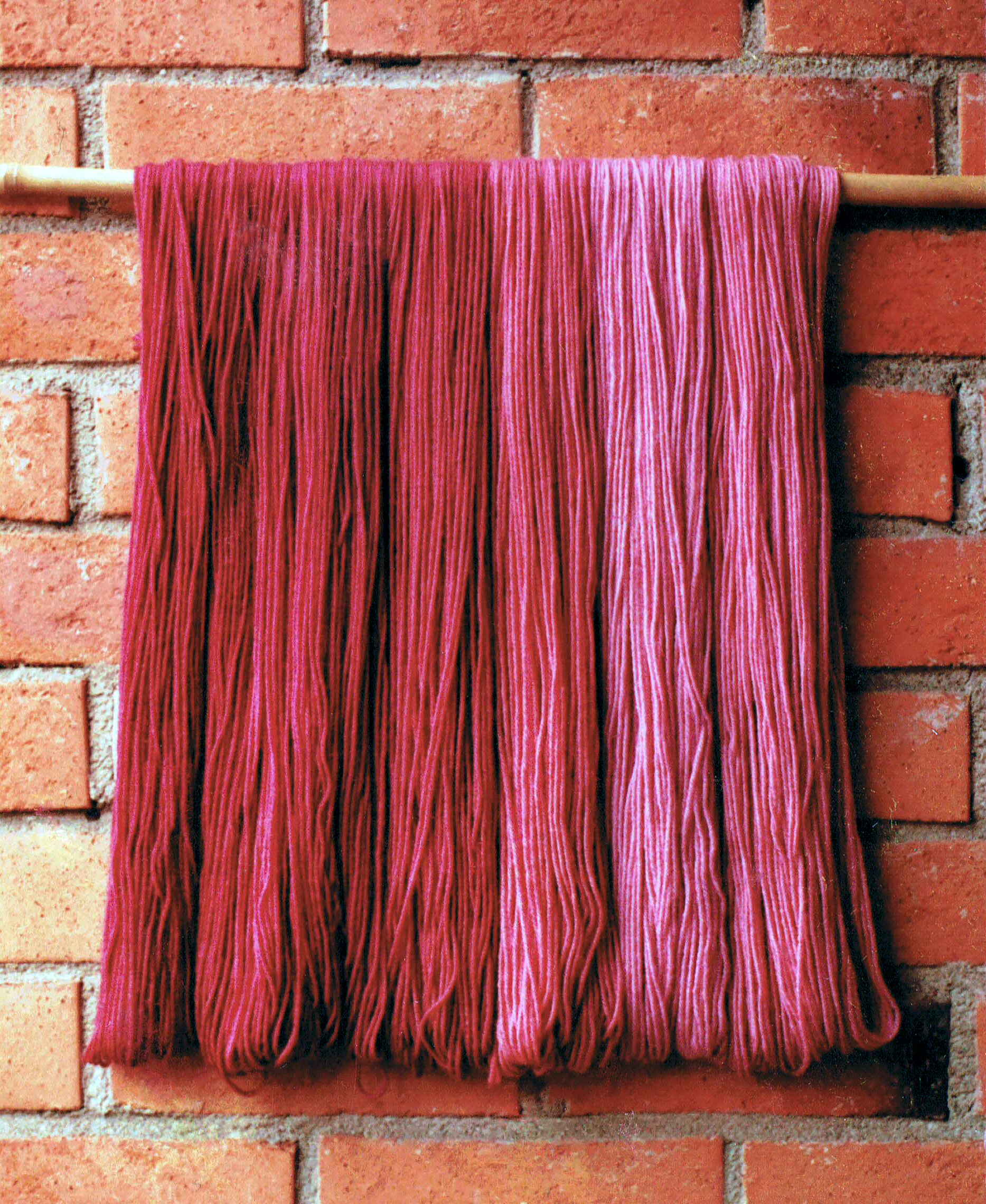
White wool yarn dyed with "orchella weeds"

Dye-bearing lichen produce a wide range of greens, oranges, yellows, reds, browns, and bright pinks and purples. The lichen Rocella tinctoria was found along the Mediterranean Sea and was used by the ancient Phoenicians. In recent times, lichen dyes have been an important part of the dye traditions of Wales, Ireland, Scotland, and among native peoples of the southwest and Intermontane Plateaus of the United States. Scottish lichen dyes include cudbear (also called archil in England and litmus in the Netherlands), and crottle.

=== Fungi ===
The American artist Miriam C. Rice pioneered research into using various mushrooms for natural dyes. Starting in the late 1960s, she discovered mushroom dyes for a complete rainbow palette. Swedish and American mycologists, building upon Rice's research, have discovered sources for true blues (Sarcodon squamosus) and mossy greens (Hydnellum geogenium). Hypholoma fasciculare provides a yellow dye, and fungi such as Phaeolus schweinitzii and Pisolithus tinctorius are used in dyeing textiles and paper.

== Luxury dyestuffs ==
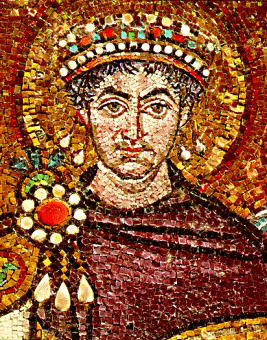
Byzantine Emperor Justinian I clad in Tyrian purple, 6th-century mosaic at Basilica of San Vitale, Ravenna, Italy

From the second millennium BC to the 19th century, a succession of rare and expensive natural dyestuffs came in and out of fashion in the ancient world and then in Europe. In many cases the cost of these dyes far exceeded the cost of the wools and silks they colored, and often only the finest grades of fabrics were considered worthy of the best dyes.

=== Royal purple ===
The premier luxury dye of the ancient world was Tyrian purple or royal purple, a purple-red dye which is extracted from several genera of sea snails, primarily the spiny dye-murex Murex brandaris (currently known as Bolinus brandaris). Murex dye was greatly prized in antiquity because it did not fade, but instead became brighter and more intense with weathering and sunlight. Murex dyeing may have been developed first by the Minoans of East Crete or the West Semites along the Levantine coast, and heaps of crushed murex shells have been discovered at a number of locations along the eastern Mediterranean dated to the mid-2nd millennium BC. The classical dye known as Phoenician Red was also derived from murex snails.

Murex dyes were fabulously expensive – one snail yields but a single drop of dye – and the Roman Empire imposed a strict monopoly on their use from the reign of Alexander Severus (AD 225–235) that was maintained by the succeeding Byzantine Empire until the Early Middle Ages. The dye was used for imperial manuscripts on purple parchment, often with text in silver or gold, and porphyrogenitos or "born in the purple" was a term for Byzantine offspring of a reigning Emperor. The color matched the increasingly rare purple rock porphyry, also associated with the imperial family.

=== Crimson and scarlet ===
Tyrian purple retained its place as the premium dye of Europe until it was replaced "in status and desirability" by the rich crimson reds and scarlets of the new silk-weaving centers of Italy, colored with kermes. Kermes is extracted from the dried unlaid eggs of the insect Kermes vermilio or Kermococcus vermilio found on species of oak (especially the Kermes oak of the Mediterranean region). The dye is of ancient origin; jars of kermes have been found in a Neolithic cave-burial at Adaoutse, Bouches-du-Rhône. Similar dyes are extracted from the related insects Porphyrophora hamelii (Armenian cochineal) of the Caucasus region, Porphyrophora polonica (Polish cochineal or Saint John's blood) of Eastern Europe, and the lac-producing insects of India, Southeast Asia, China, and Tibet.

When kermes-dyed textiles achieved prominence around the mid-11th century, the dyestuff was called "grain" in all Western European languages because the desiccated eggs resemble fine grains of wheat or sand. Textiles dyed with kermes were described as dyed in the grain. Woollens were frequently dyed in the fleece with woad and then piece-dyed in kermes, producing a wide range colors from blacks and grays through browns, murreys, purples, and sanguines. By the 14th and early 15th century, brilliant full grain kermes scarlet was "by far the most esteemed, most regal" color for luxury woollen textiles in the Low Countries, England, France, Spain and Italy.

Cochineal (Dactylopius coccus) is a scale insect of Central and North America from which the crimson-colored dye carmine is derived. It was used by the Aztec and Maya peoples. Moctezuma in the 15th century collected tribute in the form of bags of cochineal dye. Soon after the Spanish conquest of the Aztec Empire cochineal began to be exported to Spain, and by the seventeenth century it was a commodity traded as far away as India. During the colonial period the production of cochineal (in Spanish, grana fina) grew rapidly. Produced almost exclusively in Oaxaca by indigenous producers, cochineal became Mexico's second most valued export after silver. Cochineal produces purplish colors alone and brilliant scarlets when mordanted with tin; thus cochineal, which produced a stronger dye and could thus be used in smaller quantities, replaced kermes dyes in general use in Europe from the 17th century.

=== The rise of formal black ===
During the course of the 15th century, the civic records show brilliant reds falling out of fashion for civic and high-status garments in the Duchy of Burgundy in favor of dark blues, greens, and most important of all, black. The origins of the trend for somber colors are elusive, but are generally attributed to the growing influence of Spain and possibly the importation of Spanish merino wools. The trend spread in the next century: the Low Countries, German states, Scandinavia, England, France, and Italy all absorbed the sobering and formal influence of Spanish dress after the mid-1520s.

Producing fast black in the Middle Ages was a complicated process involving multiple dyeings with woad or indigo followed by mordanting, but at the dawn of Early Modern period, a new and superior method of dyeing black dye reached Europe via Spanish conquests in the New World. The new method used logwood (Haematoxylum campechianum), a dyewood native to Mexico and Central America. Although logwood was poorly received at first, producing a blue inferior to that of woad and indigo, it was discovered to produce a fast black in combination with a ferrous sulfate (copperas) mordant. Despite changing fashions in color, logwood was the most widely used dye by the 19th century, providing the sober blacks of formal and mourning clothes.

== Decline and rediscovery ==
Synthetic dyes, which could be quickly produced in large quantities, quickly superseded natural dyes for the commercial textile production enabled by the Industrial Revolution, and unlike natural dyes, were suitable for the synthetic fibres that followed. Artists of the Arts and Crafts Movement preferred the rich, complex colors of natural dyes, since many natural dye sources contain more than one type of dye compound, unlike synthetic dyes which tend to rely on a single type of dye compound, creating a flatter visual effect. This helped ensure that the old European techniques for dyeing and printing with natural dyestuffs were preserved for use by home and craft dyers. Natural dyeing techniques are also preserved by artisans in traditional cultures around the world.

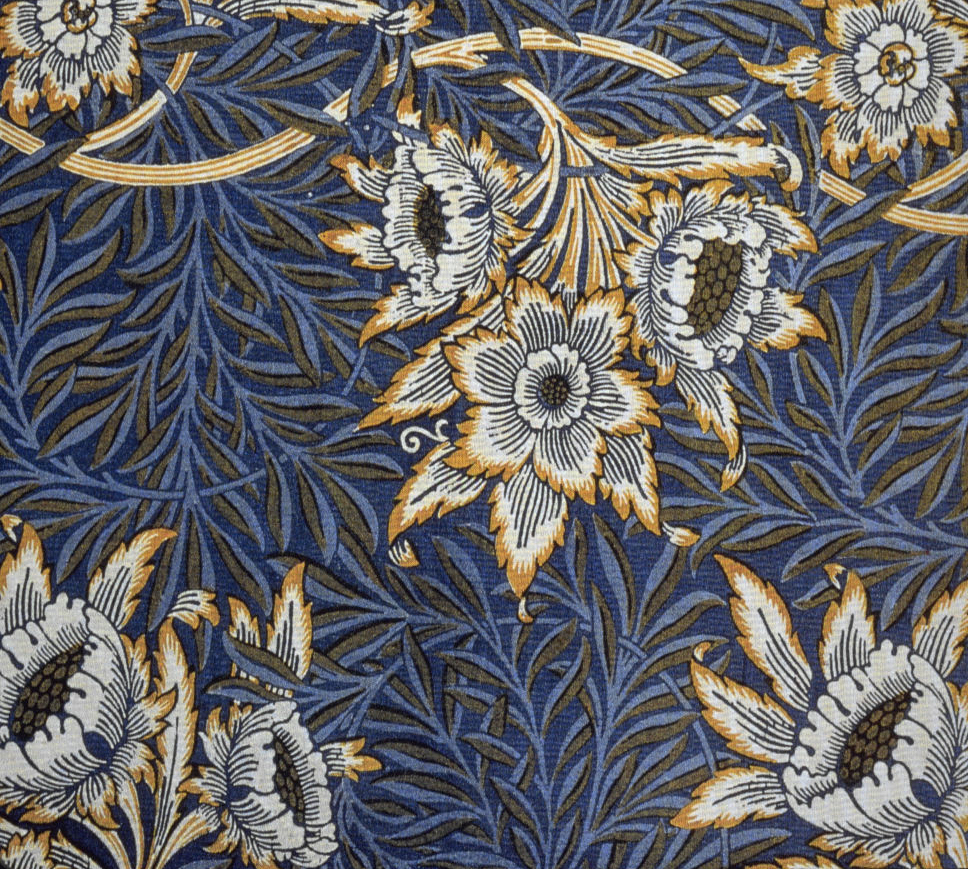
Indigo-dyed and discharge-printed textile, William Morris, 1873

=== Synthetic dyes ===
The first synthetic dyes were discovered in the mid-19th century, starting with William Henry Perkin's mauveine in 1856, an aniline dye derived from coal tar. Alizarin, the red dye present in madder, was the first natural pigment to be duplicated synthetically, in 1869, leading to the collapse of the market for naturally grown madder. The development of new, strongly colored aniline dyes followed quickly: a range of reddish-purples, blues, violets, greens and reds became available by 1880. These dyes had great affinity for animal fibres such as wool and silk. Although some new colors tended to fade and wash out, others were identical to natural dyes, e.g., indigo dye. By the 1870s commercial dyeing with natural dyestuffs was fast disappearing. The transition from natural to synthetic dyes occurred over several decades following the introduction of the first coal tar dye in 1857. Natural colorants such as dyewood continued to be produced on a large scale into the 1880s and to a lesser extent into the early twentieth century. The introduction of direct cotton (azo) dyes in the 1880s significantly reduced the use of many natural dyes, and by 1914, thousands of synthetic dyes had been introduced to the market.

Scientists continued to search for new synthetic dyes that would be effective on cellulose fibres like cotton and linen, and that would be more colorfast on wool and silk than the early anilines. Chrome or mordant dyes produced a muted but very fast color range for woollens. These were followed by acid dyes for animal fibres (from 1875) and the synthesis of indigo in Germany in 1880. The work on indigo led to the development of a new class of dyes called vat dyes in 1901 that produced a wide range of fast colors for cellulosic fibers such as cotton. Disperse dyes were introduced in 1923 to color the new textiles of cellulose acetate, which could not be colored with any existing dyes. Today disperse dyes are the only effective means of coloring many synthetics. Reactive dyes for cotton were introduced in the mid-1950s. These petroleum based, synthetic dyes are used both in commercial textile production and in craft dyeing and have widely replaced natural dyes.

=== Technique preservation ===
At the same time the Pre-Raphaelite artist and founding figure of the Arts and Crafts movement William Morris took up the art of dyeing as an adjunct to his manufacturing business, the design firm of Morris & Co. Always a medievalist at heart, Morris loathed the colors produced by the fashionable aniline dyes. He spent much of his time at his Staffordshire dye works mastering the processes of dyeing with plant materials and making experiments in the revival of old or discovery of new methods. One result of these experiments was to reinstate indigo dyeing as a practical industry and generally to renew the use of natural dyes like madder which had been driven almost out of use by the commercial success of the anilines. Morris saw dyeing of wools, silks, and cottons as the necessary preliminary to the production of woven and printed fabrics of the highest excellence; and his period of incessant work at the dye-vat (1875–76) was followed by a period during which he was absorbed in the production of textiles (1877–78), and more especially in the revival of carpet- and tapestry-weaving as fine arts. Morris & Co. also provided naturally dyed silks for the embroidery style called art needlework.

In America, synthetic dyes became popular among a wide range of Native American textile artists; however, natural dyes remained in use, as many textile collectors prefer natural dyes over synthetics. Today, dyeing with natural materials is often practiced as an adjunct to hand spinning, knitting and weaving. It remains a living craft in many traditional cultures of North America, Africa, Asia, and the Scottish Highlands.

Ecological consciousness has prompted a renewed interest in natural-dye techniques. The European Union, for example, has encouraged Indonesian batik cloth producers to switch to natural dyes to improve their export market in Europe.

=== Contemporary reskilling ===
While historically, dyers possessed sophisticated knowledge of natural sources of true dye compounds, nowadays the internet contains a lot of inaccurate information about sources—predominantly foods—that are not supported by the historic record or by modern science. In natural dyeing, there are "fast" dye compounds (those that have the necessary molecular structure to form stable chemical bonds with mordants and fibres, and so provide good resistance to fading when washed, exposed to light, or subjected to normal rubbing/abrasion; these are found throughout the historic record), and there are "fugitive" compounds, which are not true dyes (those that fade and wash out quickly, as they lack the molecular structure to form stable bonds, or any bonds at all, to mordants and fibres). Mordanting can not fix fugitive sources to fibres. Fugitive sources include nearly all berries, red cabbage, beets, spinach, black beans, most flowers (though some important true dyes are flower derived) and many others.

== See also ==
- African textile dyeing
- Plant Resources of Tropical Africa
