= Tabata Kihachi =

Fifth-generation Japanese textiles artist

Tabata Kihachi V (Japanese:五代田畑喜八) is a Japanese textile artist who specializes in dying kimono using the Yuzen technique of dyeing.

== Biography ==
Tabata was born on November 12 1935 in Kyoto. His real name is Yoshihiko. He graduated from the First Literature Department of Waseda University, specializing in Fine Arts, and completed the Japanese Painting Department at Kyoto City University of Arts. In 1985, he held a Japanese dyeing and weaving exhibition in Genoa. In 1987, he became the chairman of Kyoto Saigei Art Cooperative and the president of the Japan Hand-Painted Dyeing and Weaving Federation. In 1995, he succeeded as the fifth generation.

== Awards ==
In 2006, Tabata Kihachi V received the Order of the Rising Sun, Double Rays.

== Style ==
Tabata's work usually features classical Japanese patterns and motifs. He is well known for his use of the color blue which is often called "Tabata Blue". He often visits department stores to research what colors are popular. He also often references works found in his family kimono collection, The Tabata Collection.

== See also ==
- Moriguchi Kunihiko
- Kimono
- Yuzen
