= Rōketsuzome =

Japanese textile dyeing technique

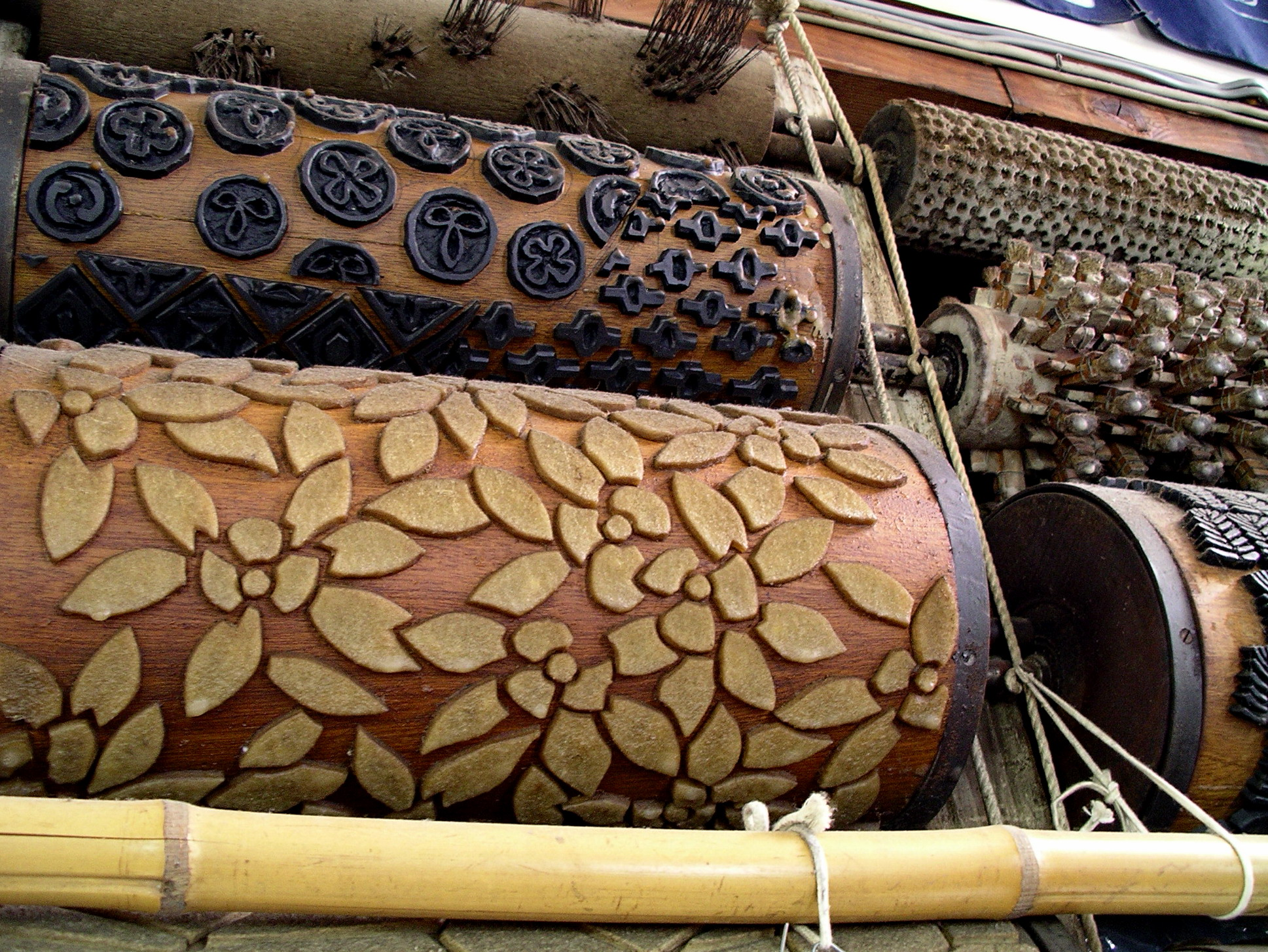
Rōketsuzome printing wheels at Roketsuzome Yamamoto, Kyoto.

Rōketsuzome (Japanese: 蝋纈染め) sometimes shortened to rōzome (ろう染め), is a traditional wax-resist textile dyeing technique in Japan, akin to Indonesian batik.

== See also ==
- Tsutsugaki
- Katazome
- Yūzen
- Bingata
