= Kakō Moriguchi =

Japanese resist-dye textile artist, known for his revival of the makinori technique

Kakō Moriguchi (森口 華弘, Moriguchi Kakō; December 10, 1909–February 20, 2008) was a Japanese textile artist who specialized in making kimono dyed using the yūzen technique of resist dyeing. He also created the makinori dyeing technique.

== Biography ==
Moriguchi was born in Moriyama, Shiga Prefecture on December 10, 1909. His given birth name was Heishichiro. He apprenticed with yūzen dyer Nakagawa Kason when he was 15. Moriguchi took the artist name "Kakō" in 1934, when he was 25. He then opened his own studio in 1939, though his business struggled due to anti-luxury measures implemented during World War II, and had to re-establish his studio in 1948.

Moriguchi first exhibited at the Japanese Traditional Craft Exhibition (Nihon Dento Kogei Ten) in 1955, where he won third place. He was named a Living National Treasure in 1967. In 1971, he was awarded the Japanese Medal of Honor (purple ribbon), and was awarded the Order of the Rising Sun in 1982.

Moriguchi died on February 20, 2008. His son, Kunihiko Moriguchi, continues his father's work as a yūzen kimono artist.

== Style ==
Though the yūzen dyeing technique is typically used in the production of colourful designs and items, Moriguchi's use of the technique was a notable departure from this. His designs, commonly taking inspiration from classical depictions of nature in traditional Japanese art, have a painterly feel to them. Moriguchi was particularly well known for his common use and depiction of chrysanthemums.

Moriguchi is best known for using the makinori (sprinkled rice paste) method of dyeing. This method involves applying flakes of zinc-infused paste to fabric before resist dyeing it. When the paste is removed, it leaves a delicately spotted, mist-like pattern. This technique, revived by Moriguchi, was commonly used in Edo period Japan, but had since been forgotten; Moriguchi decided to revive the technique after having seen a kosode that utilised it in the Tokyo National Museum. Having originally thought that he could learn the technique from a lacquer artist, due to the similarities between makinori and the lacquerwork technique of maki-e, Moriguchi, unable to find a teacher, instead replicated the makinori technique after much trial and error.

Museums that hold Moriguchi's work include the Metropolitan Museum of Art, and the Los Angeles County Museum of Art.
