= Yūzen =

Japanese dyeing technique for textiles

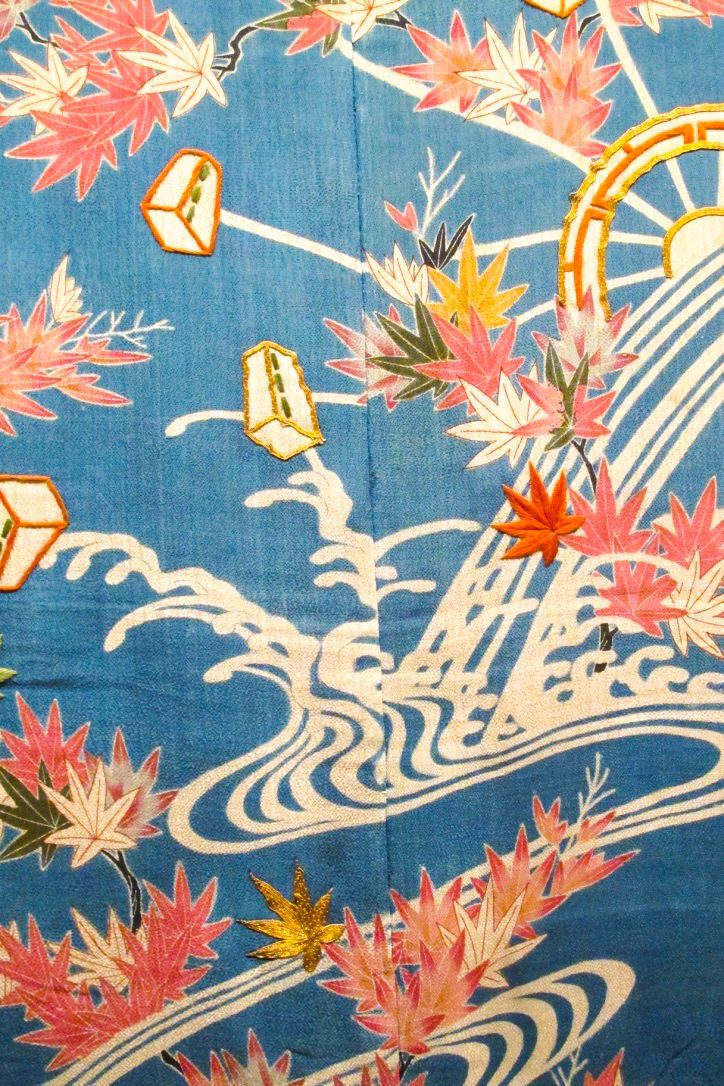
A kimono dyed with the yūzen technique, displaying characteristically crisp resist areas (thin white outlines around the dyed pattern of maple leaves)

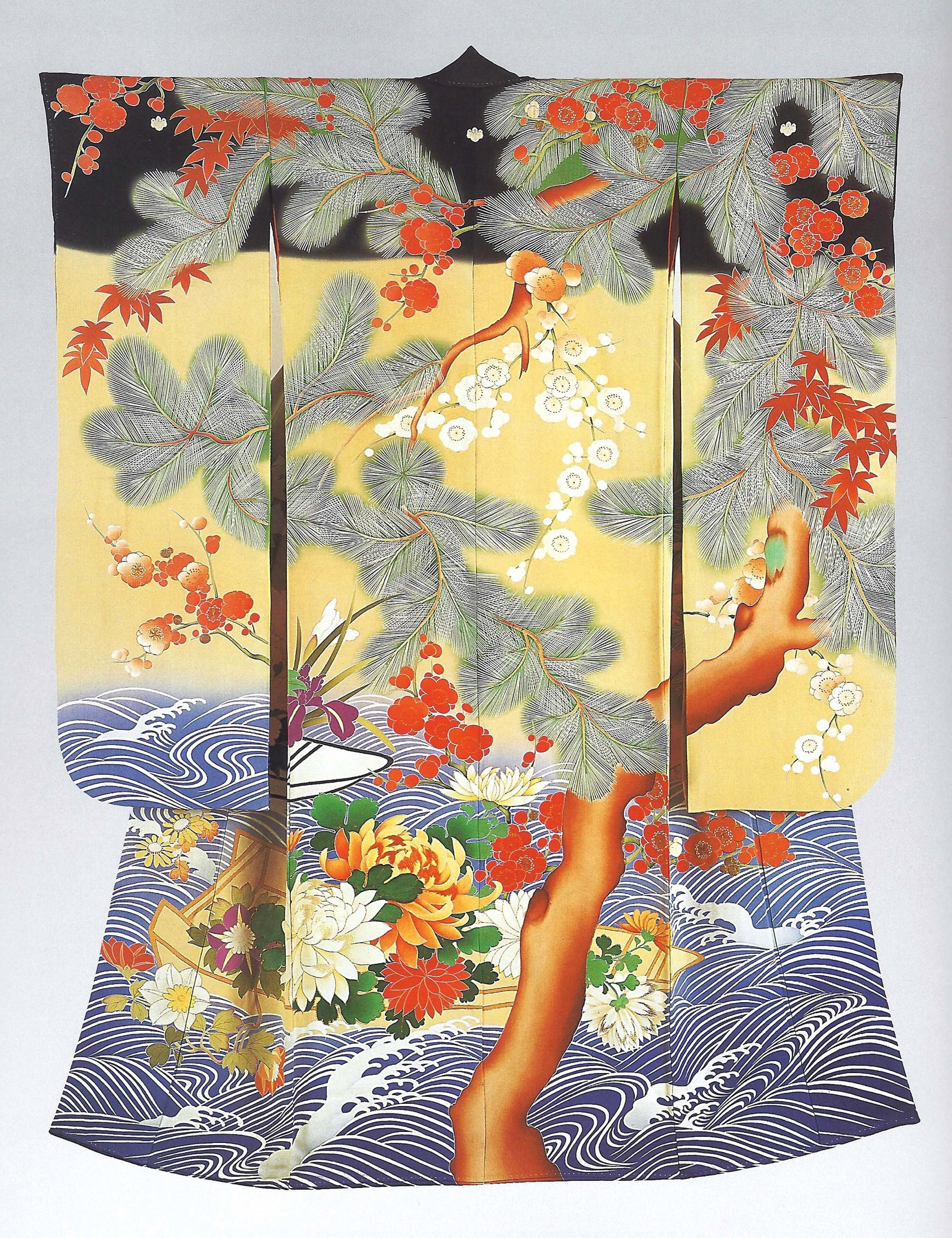
Japanese kimono dyed with the yūzen technique, 1912–1926, from the Khalili Collection of Kimono

Yūzen (友禅) is a Japanese resist dyeing technique where dyes are applied inside outlines of dyed or undyed rice-paste resist, which may be drawn freehand or stencilled; the paste keeps the dye areas separated. Originating in the 17th century, the technique became popular as both a way of subverting sumptuary laws on dress fabrics, and also as a way to quickly produce kimono that appeared to be painted freehand with dyes. The technique was named after Miyazaki Yūzen (宮崎友禅), a 17th century fan painter who perfected the technique. Miyazaki Yūzen's fan designs became so popular that a book called the yūzen-hiinagata was published in 1688, showing similar patterns applied to kosode (the predecessor of the kimono). A fashion for elaborate pictorial yūzen designs lasted until 1692.

== Technique ==
There are several subtypes of yūzen technique.

The first is itome-yūzen, sometimes also called hon-yūzen. First, a sketch is drawn freehand on the cloth or paper, using a black heat-labile ink made from dayflowers. A paste of rice powder, rice paste, rice bran and lime (called nori) is then piped from a cone, following the outline. These ridges of paste are called itome. A bean-based liquid called gojiru is then applied as a mordant, to make the dyes penetrate better. The dye-application stage is called irosashi. Dye is painted on using a brush. The ridges of paste separate the areas of dye, rather like cloissoné enamel. Within an area of dye, the brush can be used to apply ombré gradients (bokashi-zome, "ombré-dyeing"). Mushi, a step where the fabric is steamed at 80 °C (176 °F) for around 20–40 minutes, may be applied at this stage to set the colours, or steaming may be omitted until after the background is dyed. The background is dyed by covering all of the already-dyed areas with additional resist pastes, then applying the background dye either with a brush (hiki-zome), or by dipping the fabric in a vat of dye (ji-zome), sometimes with additional shibori (tie-dye) patterning. The yūzen-nagashi step washes the paste out of the fabric; this is now done in a specialized sink rather than a clear stream. The cloth may then be steamed again to adjust its dimensions, and other forms of decoration, such as embroidery, could be applied.

In the 1870s, the utsushi-yūzen technique was developed. It used synthetic aniline dyes, newly-introduced to Japan, and mixed them with the nori resist-paste. When the cloth was steamed, the dyes would penetrate the cloth, while the paste remained on the surface. The nori thus acted as both a dye and a resist against the other dyes. Stencils were extensively used. In 1879, this technique was used to dye a wool cloth called mosurin, producing mosurin-yuzen (wool was a new import to Japan at the time). Adapting the technique to silk took more time; Hirose Jisuke of Kyoto is credited for developing the kata-yūzen technique.

In 1881, improvements in the dye-paste and steaming techniques made it possible to dye the background using paste (shigoki), often using brighter colours than traditional techniques. Instead of scrolling the cloth past an artist who decorated part of it at a time, the whole length was spread on a board. All of the coloured pastes were applied through stencils with a spatula, and a different stencil was used for each colour (rather like Japanese woodblock printing). Brushwork through stencils was used only for creating gradients. A stencil for undyed paste was used to create skiamorphic white outlines between the areas of colour, making the finished kata-yūzen pattern resemble itome-yūzen.

The Exposition Universelle of 1900 in Paris introduced Art Nouveau (a Western art movement heavily influenced by Japanese art) to Japanese artists. In the early 20th century, yūzen developed new designs inspired by Art Nouveau.

Though similar in appearance to tsutsugaki, yūzen differs in application, with tsutsugaki pieces generally using one application of rice paste before dyeing, typically in an indigo dyebath, resulting in a characteristic blue-and-white end result. In contrast, yūzen can feature a number of repeated applications of rice paste, with dye hand painted into certain areas before the resist is removed.

== Present day ==
Yūzen continues to be a popular decoration technique for kimono and obi, typically used for more formal outfits, and commonly seen on kimono such as kurotomesode. Unlike other kimono dyeing techniques such as tsujigahana, yūzen has never fallen out of fashion or been forgotten as a textile decoration technique. Dyers such as Moriguchi Kako of Kyoto continue to create yūzen dyed kimono, which were so sought after that the contemporary fashion industry designed an industrial method to copy them for use on Western style clothing. Famous designers, such as Hanae Mori, borrowed extensively from kimono patterns for their couturier collections. By the late 1980s, a new handwoven and hand-dyed kimono had become extremely costly, running to US$25,000 for a formal garment.

In Okinawa, yūzen techniques have also been used to produce the stencil dyed bingata fabric native to that region, producing brightly-coloured textiles considered to be artistic national treasures.

== Yūzen variations ==
Birodo yūzen, or yūzen birodo, is a yūzen technique where velvet is dyed and painted with the yūzen technique, after which the pile is cut away carefully in certain places, creating a painterly effect of light and shade. The technique first appeared in the 19th century and was described in 1905 by Basil Hall Chamberlain. Although technically a form of velvet painting, birodo yūzen works are not comparable to Western and Middle Eastern velvet paintings, which utilise velvet as a canvas.

== See also ==
- Rōketsuzome, a traditional Japanese wax resist dye technique
- Katazome, a traditional stencil resist dye technique
- Tsutsugaki, a hand applied dye resist technique similar to yūzen
