= Kunihiko Moriguchi =

Japanese textile artist (born 1941)

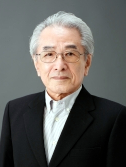

Kunihiko Moriguchi (森口 邦彦, Moriguchi Kunihiko; born 1941) is a Japanese textile artist who specializes in the yūzen dyeing technique. He is a Living National Treasure of Japan.

== Biography ==
Moriguchi was born in 1941 in Kyoto. He is the second son of Kakō Moriguchi, another well-known yūzen dyer. Moriguchi graduated from the Kyoto City University of Arts in 1963, then traveled to Paris to study at the Ecole des Arts Decoratifs. He was the first Japanese person to earn a scholarship from the French government to study in France. While in France he happened to meet and befriend Balthus, who encouraged him to follow in his father's footsteps rather than becoming a graphic designer in Europe. Moriguchi returned to Japan and began working in his father's workshop in 1967, when he was 26. He began exhibiting his work that year.

He married Keiko Terada in 1975.

Moriguchi received the Japanese Medal of Honor (purple ribbon) in 2001. In 2007, Moriguchi was named a Living National Treasure of Japan. In 2013, he was awarded the Order of the Rising Sun (gold rays with neck ribbon).

== Style ==
Much like his father before him, Moriguchi takes his inspiration from nature. Despite this, his style is unique to him, and distinct to the work of his father. Once he has a nature-inspired motif, he transforms it into an abstract, geometric shape. He prioritizes a sense of fluidity, and makes certain that the kimono he creates are as beautiful when they are being worn as they are when they are being displayed. His work is extremely graphic, influenced by Popart, a style which was popular during his time spent in Paris. He drafts his designs on paper, then paints them on white silk crêpe. He makes his dyes from scratch.

Moriguchi's work is held by several museums including the Metropolitan Museum of Art, the Victoria and Albert Museum, the Los Angeles County Museum of Art, the Hiroshima Prefectural Art Museum, the National Museum of Modern Art, Tokyo, and the National Museum of Modern Art, Kyoto. He has also regularly exhibited at the Japanese Traditional Art Crafts Exhibition since 1967.

== Honours ==
- Person of Cultural Merit (2020)
