= Miyazaki Yūzen =

Miyazaki Yūzen (宮崎 友禅, 1654 – July 25, 1736), also known as Miyazaki Yūzensai or Yūzenzai (友禅斎), was a Japanese fan painter who perfected the yūzen fabric dyeing technique.

== Biography ==
Miyazaki was born in Kyoto in 1654. He was originally a fan painter, but is also known for his work with kosode. Miyazaki painted his most popular fan designs on kimono, and they were wildly popular. He used rice paste to resist-dye the cloth in a method that he named yūzen-zome. It later became known as simply yūzen. This technique made it easier for Miyazaki to paint his designs directly on the kimono, making them more expressive.

His designs were so popular that they were published as Yuzen-hinagata (友禅雛形 “Yūzen maquette”) in 1688.

== Fan painting ==
Miyazaki was first known for his fan painting. He later painted his most popular designs onto kimono.

== Development of Yūzen method ==
Miyazaki developed a method to make it easier to resist-dye designs onto cloth. He is now more famous for this that he is as a fan painter.
