= Miriam C. Rice =

American artist (1918–2010)

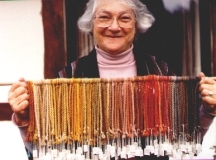
Miriam C. Rice holds mushroom dyed yarns showing the full spectrum of color.

Miriam C. Rice (January 13, 1918 – August 30, 2010) was an American artist known for developing a palette of natural dyes extracted from mushrooms and other fungi.

== Education and teaching ==
Rice studied sculpture at the Art Students League in New York and elsewhere. She went on to teach sculpture at the University of Rochester. Rice migrated to the west coast, settling in Mendocino County, California, with her husband, painter Ray Rice. She helped to develop the art program at the Mendocino Art Center and taught there for years. Rice's sculpture of Mendocino Art Center founder Bill Zacha stands in the center's courtyard.

== Artistic activity ==
Early on, Rice discovered her deep interest in the arts, in particular sculpture for which she received critical recognition. By age 18 she was living in New York City and studying at the Art Students League. As a young woman she was honored to receive an artist-in-residency at the famed artists’ community, Yaddo, in upstate New York. Miriam maintained her art practice throughout her life, thoroughly exploring sculpture, then batik and the textile arts, and finally the world of fungi through the lens of the fine arts. Several generations of women artists were supported in their personal journeys by her interest and encouragement.

== Dye research ==
In the late 1960s, Rice began working with natural dyes for her block prints and this led her to experiment with mushrooms. The first mushroom she worked with was Hypholoma fasciculare, which produced a bright yellow dye. Her further experiments led her to mushrooms like the puffball Pisolithus arhizus (yellow, brown, and black hues) and the polypore Phaeolus schweinitzii (green, yellow, and brown hues). Although Rice herself preferred to use scientific names when referring to mushrooms to avoid confusion, both of these mushrooms have acquired new common names thanks to her work. P. tinctorius is now known as dyer's puffball, while P. schweinitzii is dyer's polypore. Over time, she uncovered a wide palette of mushroom dyes that were both colorfast and lightfast, and she is now acknowledged as a pioneer of modern research into the use of mushrooms for natural dyes. Her palette of discoveries ranged from yellow through ochre, orange, rose, and russet shades to burnt sienna and chocolate brown.

Historical sources show that mushroom-derived dyes were used in the Americas and Europe at least as far back as the 15th century, though such uses appear to have been uncommon. World War II prompted some further experiments, but when Rice began her research, the contemporary literature had very little information on the subject and no practical guidance. Rice wrote the first modern book on the subject, Let's Try Mushrooms for Color, which came out in 1974 and was an international success. Rice's second book, Mushrooms for Color (1980), included a much-expanded range of pigments developed in the intervening years, a whole color wheel, including greens, reds, blues, and violets. Other researchers, principally from America and the Nordic countries, have built on her initial research to further develop this range of color.

Rice later experimented with using mushroom-derived pigments in watercolor paint and with turning the mushroom pulp that remained after dye extraction into paper. She discovered that the best results for papermaking are obtained from tree fungi. She also developed "Myco-Stix", crayons whose mushroom-extracted pigments are held together by one of several binders derived from mushrooms like Pseudohydnum gelatinosum.

In 1976, as a result of her work, the Mendocino County Museum held the first-ever exhibition devoted to fiber art dyed with mushrooms. In 1980, Rice led the founding of the International Mushroom Dye Institute to encourage the use and further development of mushroom dyes. Around the same time, she also helped inspire formation of the International Fibre & Fungi Symposia, biannual meetings that convene artists and scientists from around the world to share their research.

== Publications ==
=== Books and videos ===
- Rice, Miriam C. (1974). Let's Try Mushrooms for Color. Santa Rosa, CA: Thresh Publications.
- Rice, Miriam C. (1980). Mushrooms for Color. Eureka, CA: Mad River Press.
- Rice, Miriam C. (2007). Mushrooms for Dyes, Paper, Pigments and Myco-Stix. Forestville, CA: Mushrooms for Color Press.
- Rice, Miriam C. Mushrooms for Color and Papermaking with Polypores (DVD). International Mushroom Dye Institute Videos.

=== Articles ===
- Rice, Miriam C. (Autumn 1981). "Mushrooms for Color". Arboretum Bulletin. 44 (3): 6–11.
- Rice, Miriam C. (April–May 1987). "Dyes from Mushrooms, A Spectrum of Extraordinary Color". Threads Magazine: 44–47.
- Rice, Miriam C. (Summer 1990). "Mushrooms for Color". Brooklyn Botanical Garden Record. 46 (2): 42–25.
- Rice, Miriam C. (Winter 1991–1992). "Fine Paper from Mushrooms". Mushroom, the Journal of Wild Mushrooming (34): 21–22.
- Rice, Miriam C. (Summer 1992). "Part Two of Making Paper from Mushrooms". Mushroom, the Journal of Wild Mushrooming (36): 22–26.
- Rice, Miriam C. (August 1998). "Mushrooms for Color". Turkey Red Journal. 4 (2): 1–4.
