= Mika Toba =

Japanese artist

Mika Toba (鳥羽 美花, Toba Mika; 1961) is a Japanese katazome dye artist. Her art mainly incorporates motifs and landscapes from Vietnam - a country she has visited over 50 times since the 1990s. Her art has been displayed at the Kennin-ji temple in Kyoto and at the Ho Chi Minh City Museum of Fine Arts, among other places. She is a graduate of the Kyoto City University of Arts (M.A.). Toba was awarded the Cultural Testimonial Award by the Vietnamese Government in 2005 and the Japanese Foreign Minister's Commendation in 2012 (gaimu daijin hyōei (外務大臣表彰)). She was the subject of a NHK World documentary first broadcast in January 2015.
