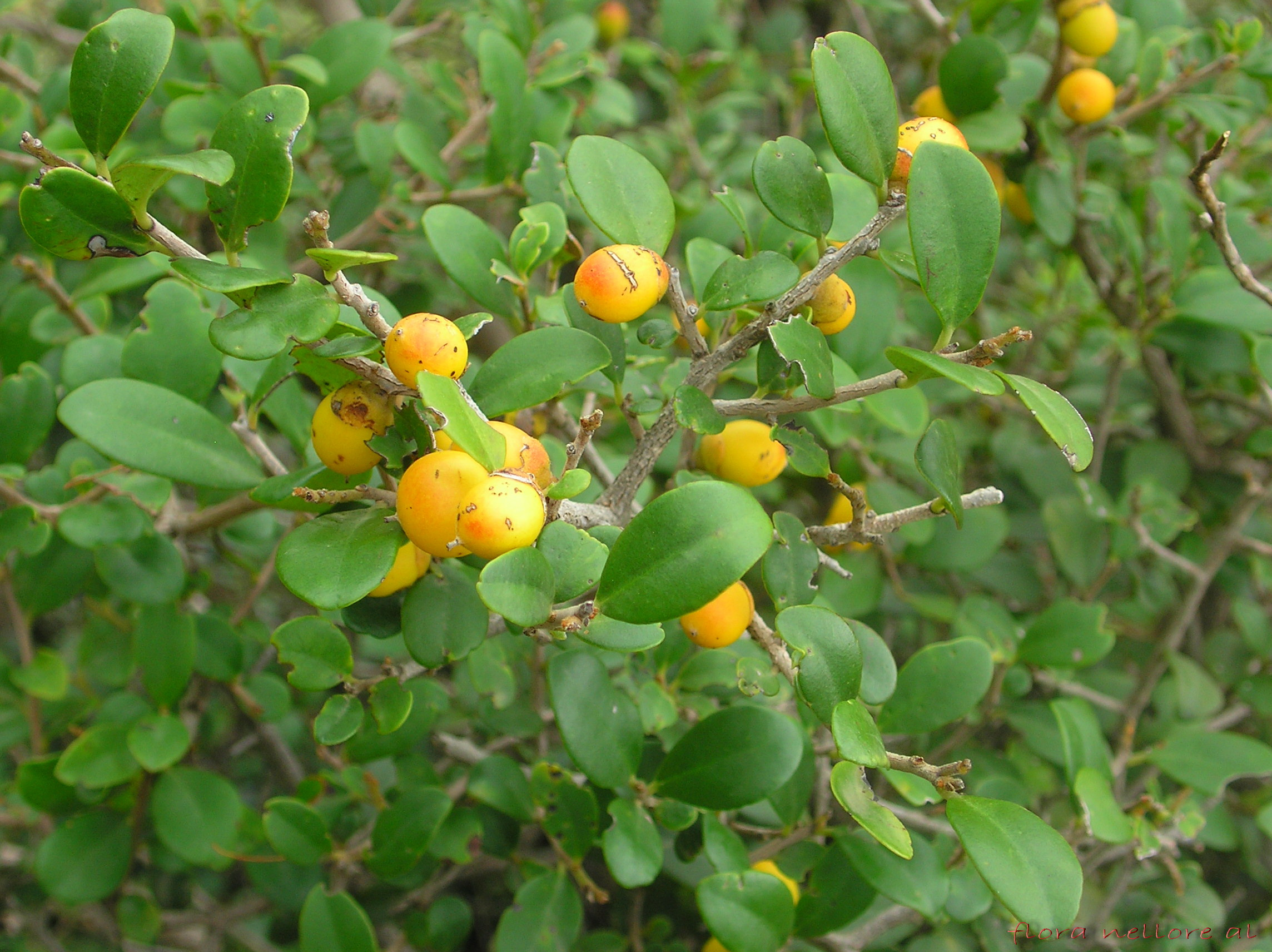

Scientific classification
- Kingdom: Plantae
- Clade: Tracheophytes
- Clade: Angiosperms
- Clade: Eudicots
- Clade: Asterids
- Order: Ericales
- Family: Ebenaceae
- Genus: Diospyros
- Species: D. ferrea

Binomial name
- Diospyros ferrea (Willd.) Bakh.

Synonyms
- Ehretia ferrea Willd.; Diospyros ferrea var. buxifolia (Rottb.) Bakh.; Maba buxifolia (Rottb.) Juss.; Pisonia buxifolia Rottb.

= Diospyros ferrea =

Species of flowering plant

Diospyros ferrea, known as black ebony, is a tree in the ebony family, distributed in Burma (Myanmar), Cambodia, India, Indonesia, Malay Peninsula, Philippines, Sri Lanka, Thailand, Laos (Khammouan) and Taiwan (Hengchun Peninsula and Orchid Island).

== Distribution ==
It is found from West Africa to India, Indo-China, north to the Ryukyu Islands (Japan), east to the Malesian area, Australia, Melanesia and Polynesia.

== Uses ==
D. ferrea is reported to be an important source of black ebony, but this is doubtful because of the unsatisfactory taxonomy of the group involved.

== Gallery ==
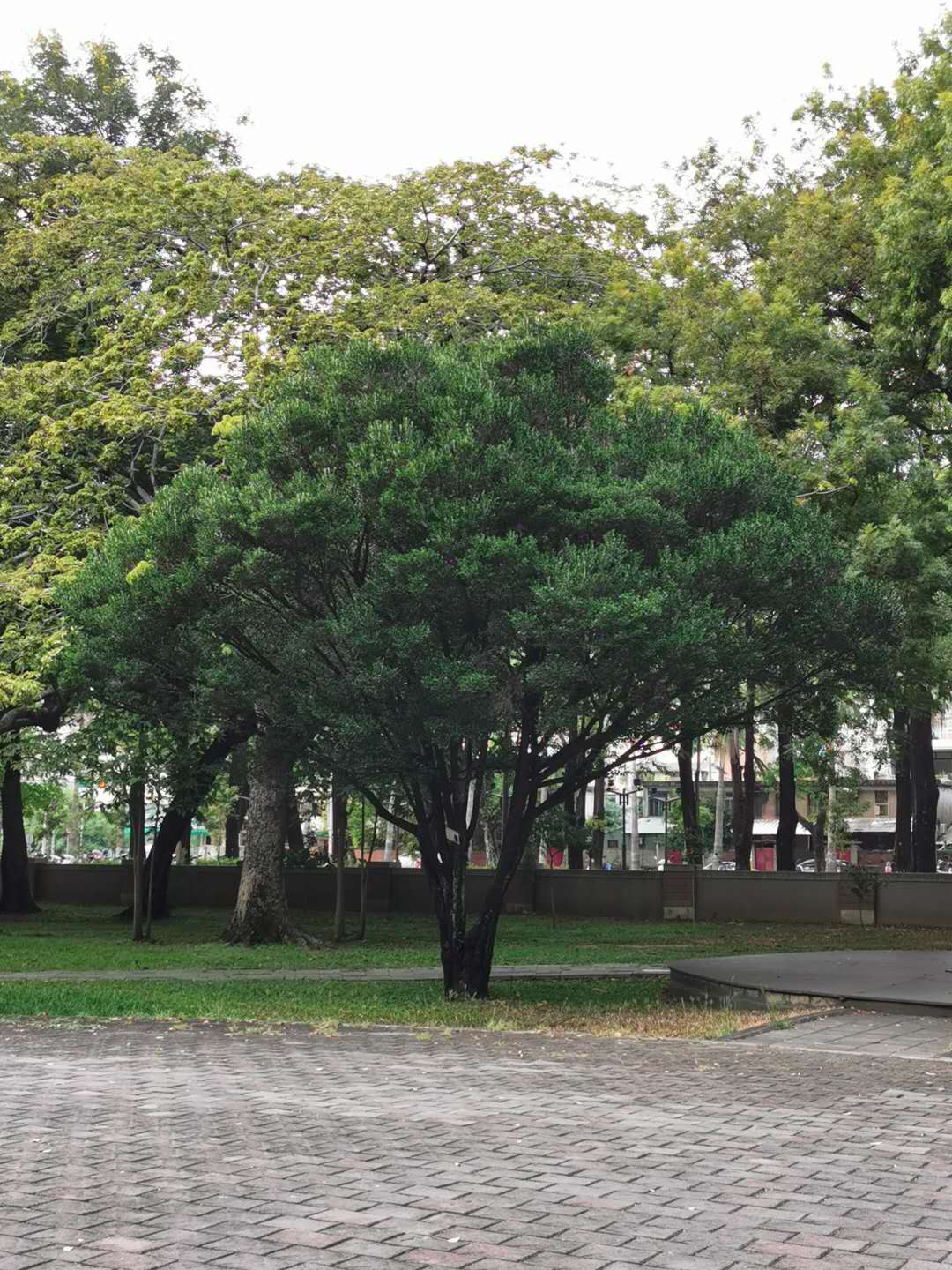
Plant, slow growth, dark green leaves, dioecious

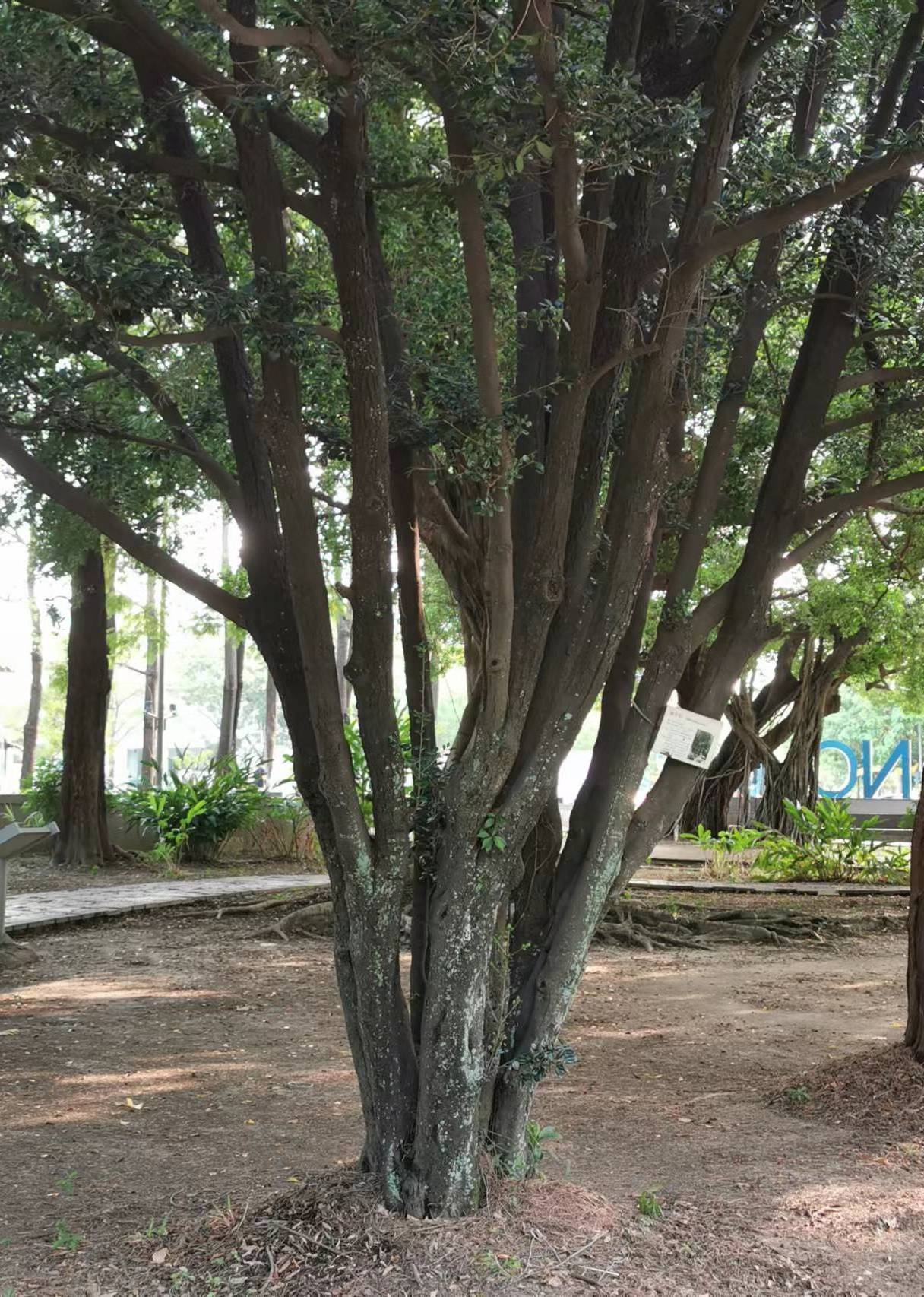
Black bark and heartwood

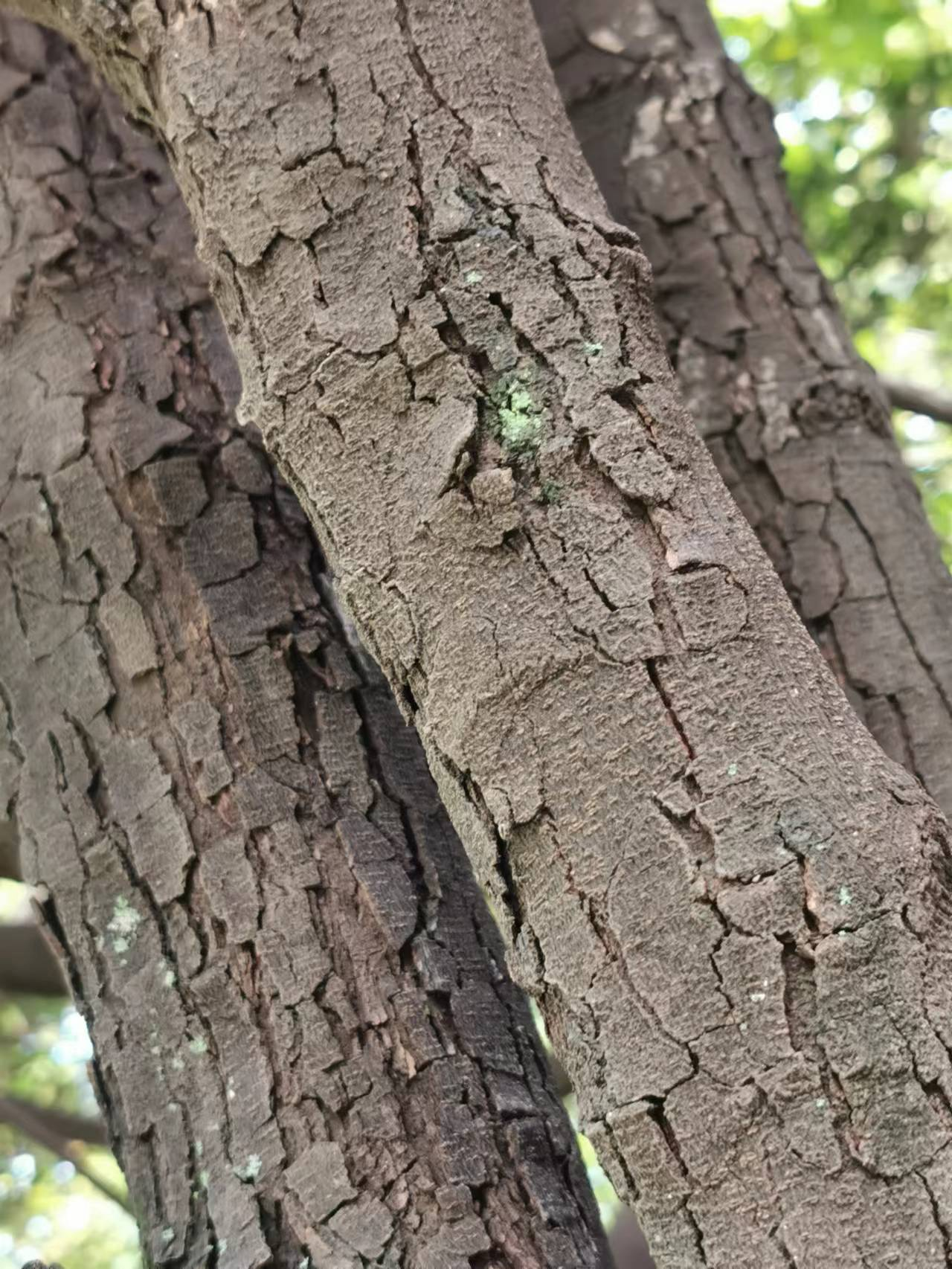
Cracked bark shape

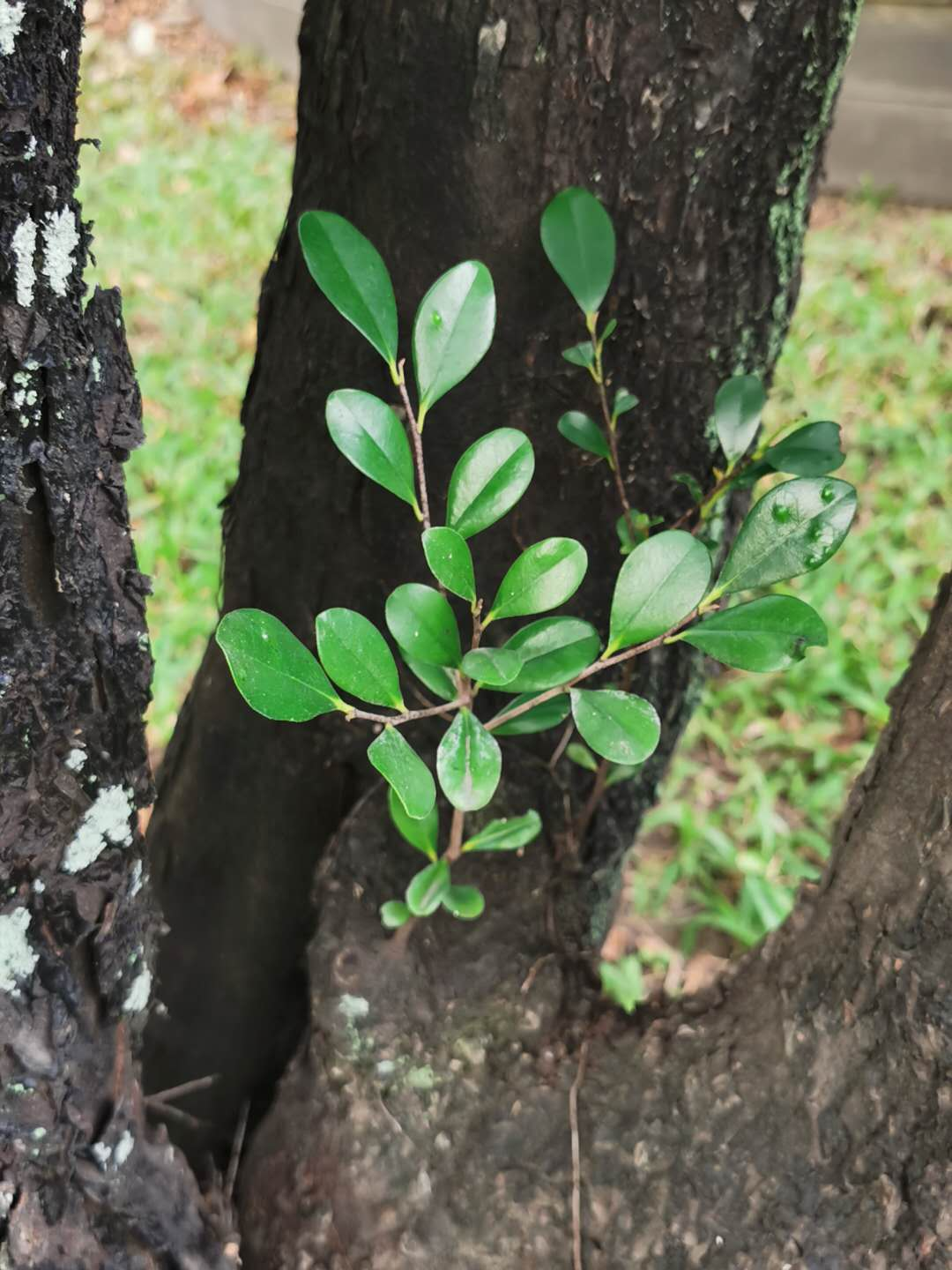
New branches
