= Tsutsugaki =

Japanese technique of resist dyeing

Tsutsugaki (筒描) is a Japanese technique of resist dyeing that involves drawing rice-paste designs on cloth, dyeing the cloth, and then washing off the paste.

The rice paste is typically made from sweet rice, which has a high starch content and is therefore rather sticky. The paste is applied through a tube (tsutsu) similar to a piping bag. A related process is to apply the paste through a stencil, a technique known as katazome.

The cloth dyed is typically cotton, and the dye is typically indigo, so the design is usually white on blue. Banners for shops or other purposes are sometimes made in this manner.

The designs are often creatures from Japanese mythology such as the crane or the tortoise, or a family crest, or a name (written in kanji). Flowers and trees are common motifs as well.

== Bibliography ==
- Tsutsugaki Textiles of Japan: Traditional Freehand Paste Resist Indigo Dyeing Technique of Auspicious Motifs. Kyoto: Shikosha, 1987. Text by Sachio Yoshioka; editor, Noriko Hirai; collector, Gensho Sasakura.
- Reiko Mochinaga Brandon. Country Textiles of Japan: The Art of Tsutsugaki. Honolulu Academy of the Arts, 1986. ISBN 0-937426-22-9
