= White bryony =

White bryony may refer to:

- Bryonia alba, found in Europe and northern Iran
- Bryonia dioica, also known as red bryony
