= Resist dyeing =

Traditional method of dyeing textiles with patterns

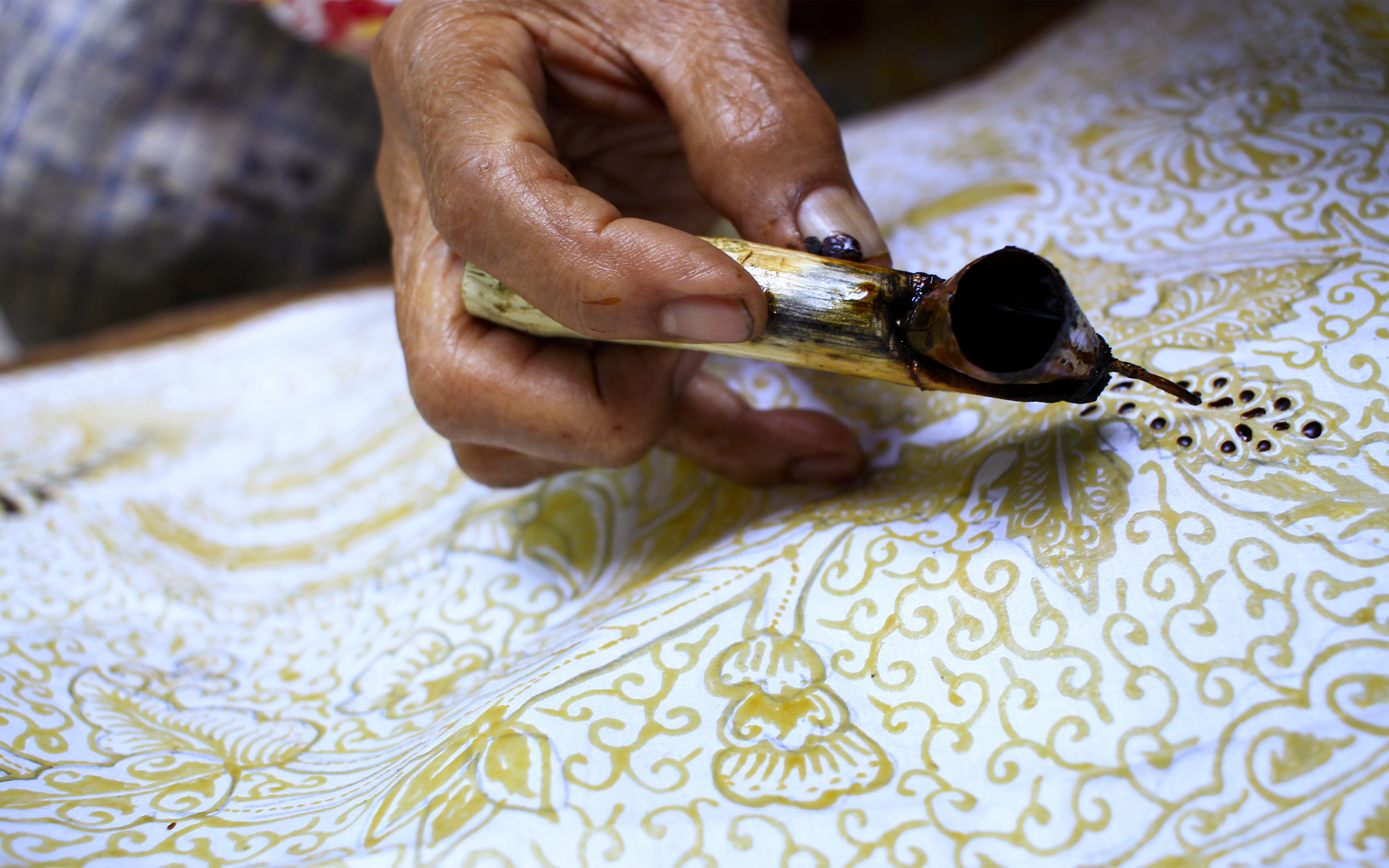
A nembok process in batik-making method especially for batik tulis (lit. 'hand-crafted batik').

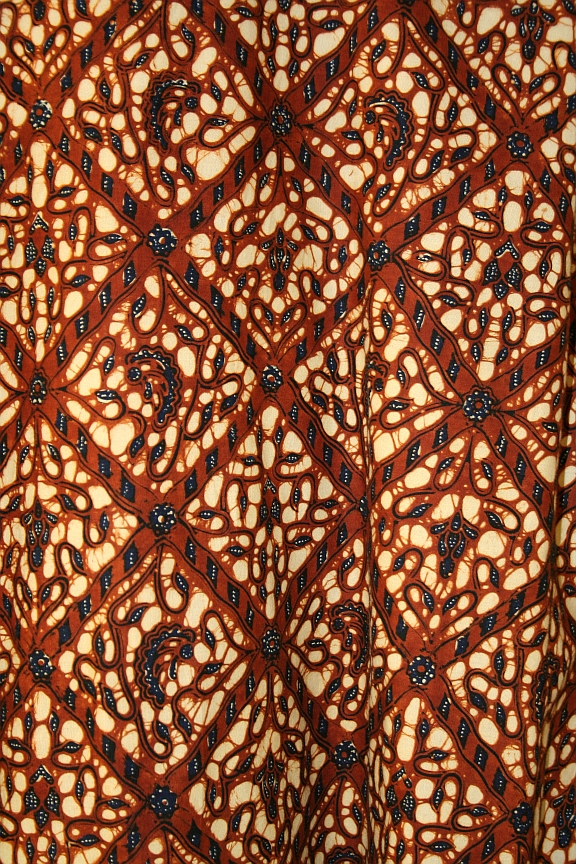
Batik, created using the technique of wax-resist dyeing originated from Java (part of modern-day Indonesia).

Resist dyeing (resist-dyeing) is a traditional method of dyeing textiles with patterns. Methods are used to "resist" or prevent the dye from reaching all the cloth, thereby creating a pattern and ground. The most common forms use wax, some type of paste made from starch or mud, or a mechanical resist that manipulates the cloth such as tying or stitching. Another form of resist involves using a dye containing a chemical agent that will repel another type of dye printed over the top. The best-known varieties today include tie-dye, batik, and ikat.

== Basic methods ==
=== Wax or paste ===
Principle of resist dyeing, such as Batik

In wax or paste resists, melted wax or some form of paste is applied to cloth before being dipped in dye. Wherever the resist medium has seeped through the fabric, the dye will not penetrate. Sometimes several colors are used, with a series of steps including dyeing, drying, and the repeated application of the resist. The resist may also be applied to another piece of cloth to make a stencil, which is then placed over the cloth, and dye applied to the assembly; this is known as resist printing.

=== Stencils ===
In stencilled resists, a stencil is placed over the fabric where it is to be shielded from ink, similar to how screen prints are made.

=== Mechanical ===
Mechanical resist dyeing ties, stitches or clamps the cloth using clothespins or wooden blocks to shield areas of the fabric from the dye.

=== Chemical ===
Chemical resist dyeing is a modern textile printing method, commonly achieved using two different classes of fibers reactive dyes, one of which must be of the vinyl sulfone type. A chemical-resisting agent is combined with dye Type A, and printed using the screenprint method and allowed to dry. A second dye, Type B, is then printed overtop. The resist agent in Type A chemically prevents Type B from reacting with the fabric, resulting in a crisp pattern/ground relationship.

== History ==
Resist dyeing has been very widely used in Asia, Africa, and Europe since ancient times. The earliest extant pieces of resist-dyed fabric were found in Egypt, dating to the 4th century AD. Cloths used for mummy wrappings were sometimes coated with wax, scratched with a sharp stylus, and dyed with a mixture of blood and ashes. After dyeing, the cloth was washed in hot water to remove the wax.

In Asia, this technique was practiced in China during the Tang dynasty (618–907 AD), Indonesia, India, and Japan in the Nara period (645–794 AD). In Africa, it was originally practiced by the Yoruba people in Nigeria, and the Soninke and Wolof in Senegal.

== Traditions using wax or paste ==
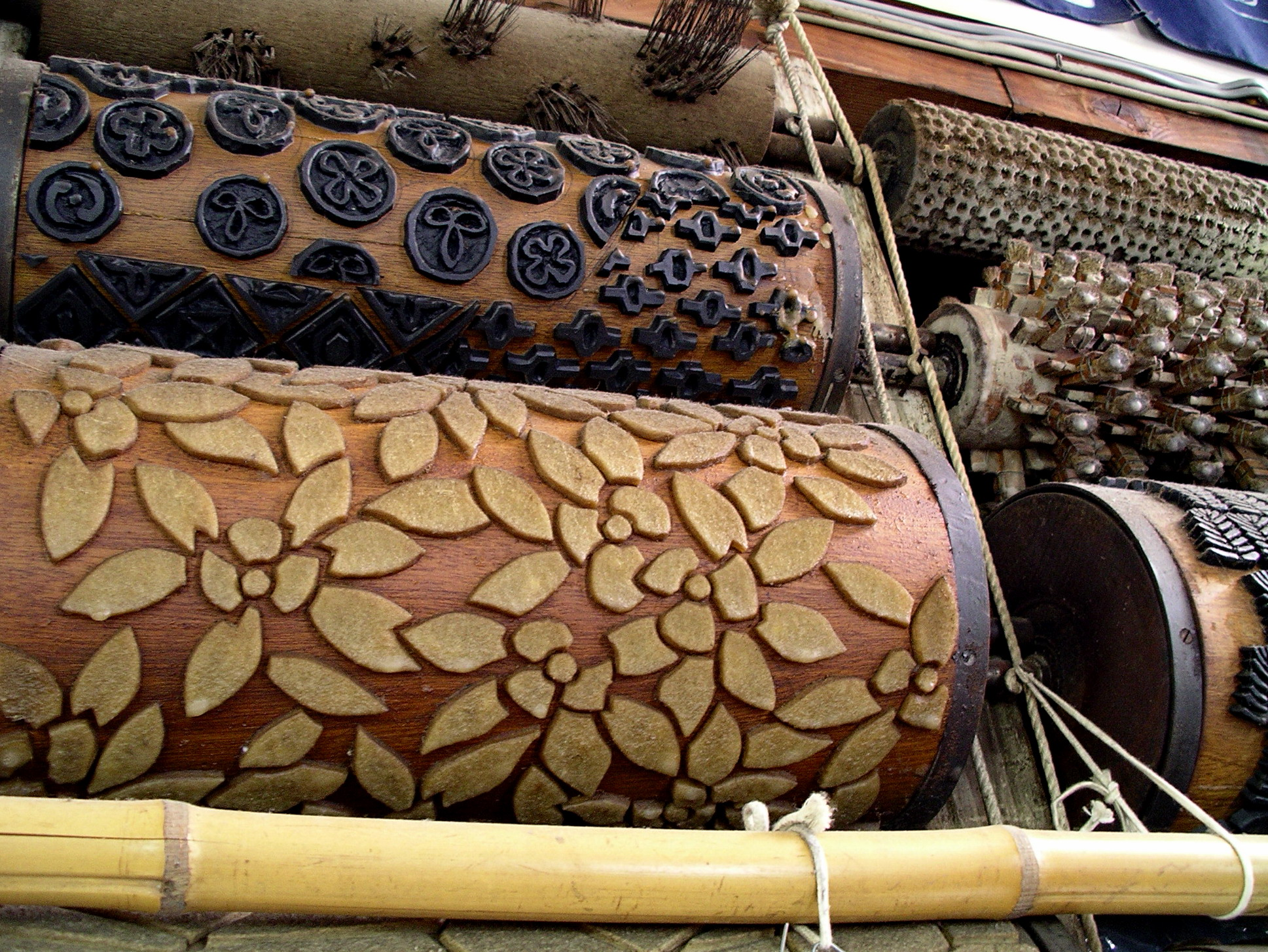
Rōketsuzome printing wheels at Roketsuzome Yamamoto, Kyoto.

- Guizhou (part of modern-day China), has a strong tradition of wax-resist dyeing.
- Java (part of modern-day Indonesia) is known for their batik traditions.
- In Japan, rōketsuzome (wax-resist dyeing) katazome (rice-paste stencilled resist dyeing), yūzen (freehand rice-paste resist dyeing) and tsutsugaki (freehand rice-paste resist dyeing, typically plain white patterns on an indigo ground) are all common resist dyeing techniques used on a variety of textiles.
- In Africa (especially the post-colonial Dutch African territories), the Yoruba people of Nigeria use cassava paste as a resist, while the people of Senegal use rice paste. Madiba shirts are also well-known for their resist-dyed patterns.

== Traditions using tying or stitching ==
- Java and Lesser Sunda Islands (part of modern-day Indonesia) is well-known for the tradition of ikat weaving, where the warp or weft is dyed before a fabric is woven. Warp and weft ikat are more common, with the double-ikat being rarer.
- Indian textiles featured tied or stitched resists.
- The Yoruba people of Nigeria produce Adire textiles, which are tied before being dyed with indigo
- In Japan, shibori is a tie-dye technique known for its use on kimono and other traditional textiles. It has been produced in Japan for centuries, following the technique's likely introduction from China.

== Traditions using printing ==
- In Japan, both katazome and bingata use stencilled resist-dyeing methods to create highly detailed resist-dyed fabrics. Beni itajime is a block-resist dyeing method that was common throughout the Meiji period (1868-1912), used to create red lining fabrics with crisp white designs.
- In China, the jia xie method, invented around 500 AD, uses wooden blocks to dye patterns onto fabric, usually silk. An upper and a lower block is made, with carved out compartments opening to the back, fitted with plugs. The cloth, usually folded a number of times, is inserted and clamped between the two blocks. By unplugging the different compartments and filling them with dyes of different colours, a multi-coloured pattern can be printed over quite a large area of folded cloth.

== Other traditions ==
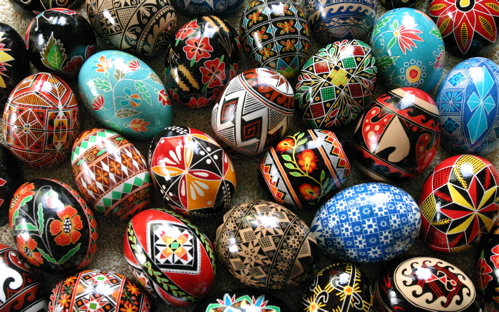
A mix of modern and traditional Ukrainian pysanky

- Ukraine, Russia and Poland – Pysanka, with wax for eggs at Easter

== See also ==
- Tritik
- Woodblock printing
- Byzantine dress
- Katazome
