= Katazome =

Japanese method of dyeing fabrics

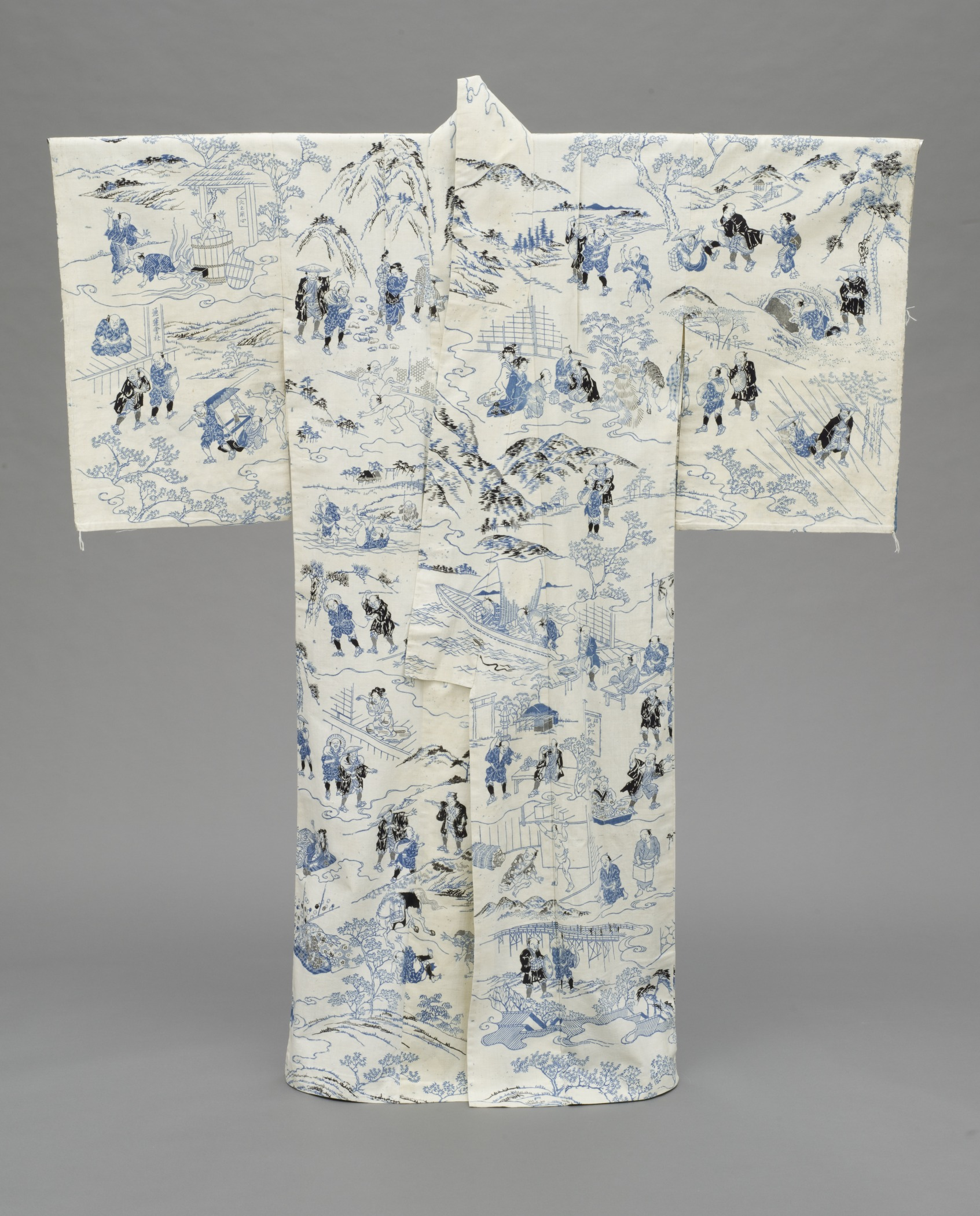
An early 19th century katazome-dyed summer kimono

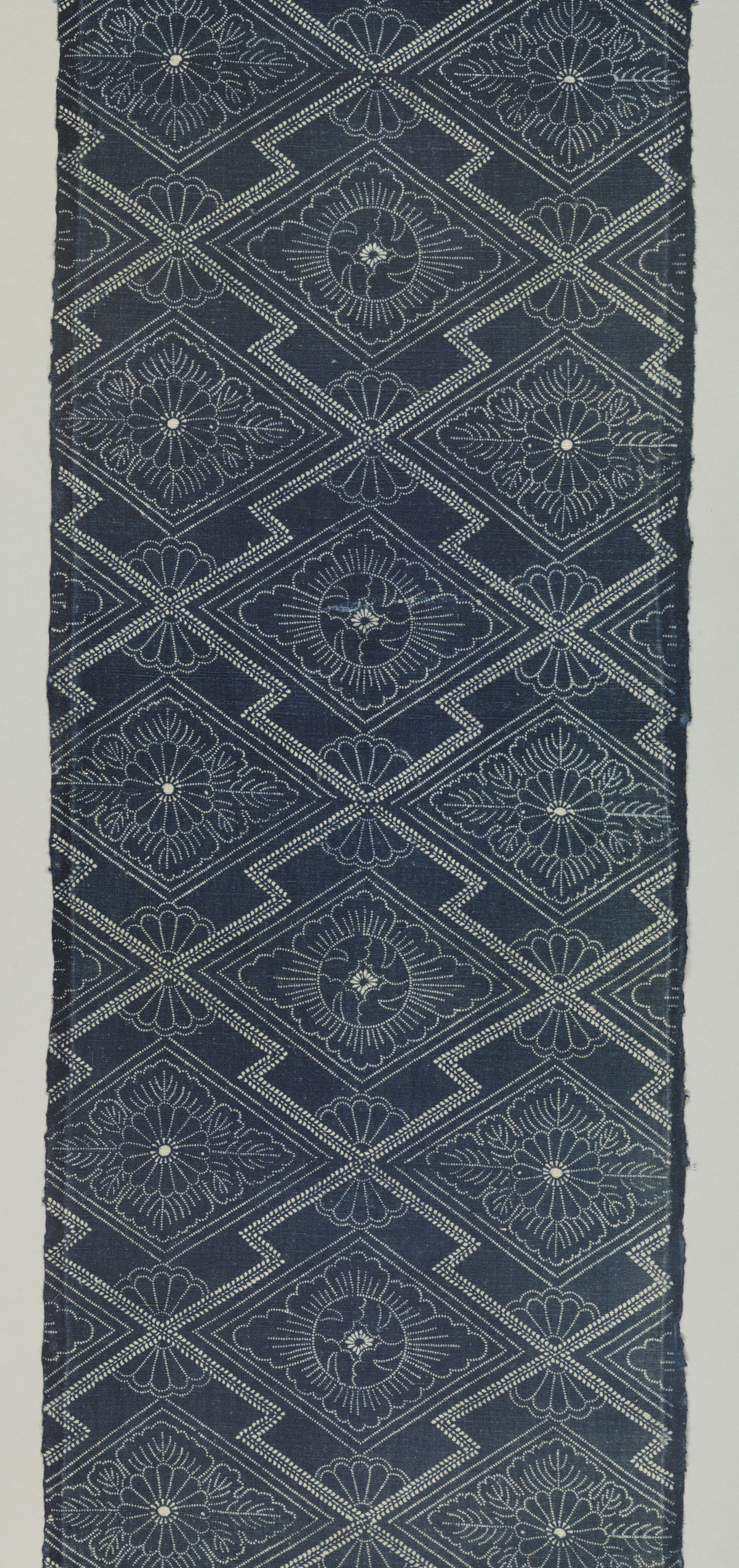
Length showing repeating pattern

Katazome (型染め) is a Japanese method of dyeing fabrics using a resist paste applied through a stencil, typically a rice flour mixture applied with a brush or a tool such as a palette knife. Unlike yūzen, stencils are used repeatedly to make a repeating pattern. Dye or pigment is added by hand-painting, immersion dyeing, or both. The area of the fabric covered and permeated by the paste mixture resists the later application of dye, thus creating undyed areas within the fabric.

Katazome was first invented as an inexpensive and faster alternative to highly-patterned woven brocade fabrics. Over time, katazome evolved into a respected fibre art form of its own.

Thin fabrics dyed in the katazome style show the fabric's design on the back of the fabric, whereas thicker or more tightly-woven fabrics generally have a solid colour underside, typically indigo blue for cotton fabrics. Futon covers made from multiple panels of katazome fabric, if the stencils are properly placed and the panels joined correctly, can display a seamless stencilled pattern. Besides cotton, katazome has been used to decorate linen, silk and fabrics that are entirely or partially-synthetic.

== See also ==
- Shibori
- Yūzen
- Serizawa Keisuke
- Mika Toba
- Resist dyeing
- Tanmono
