= Kosode =

Historic Japanese garment and the predecessor of the kimono

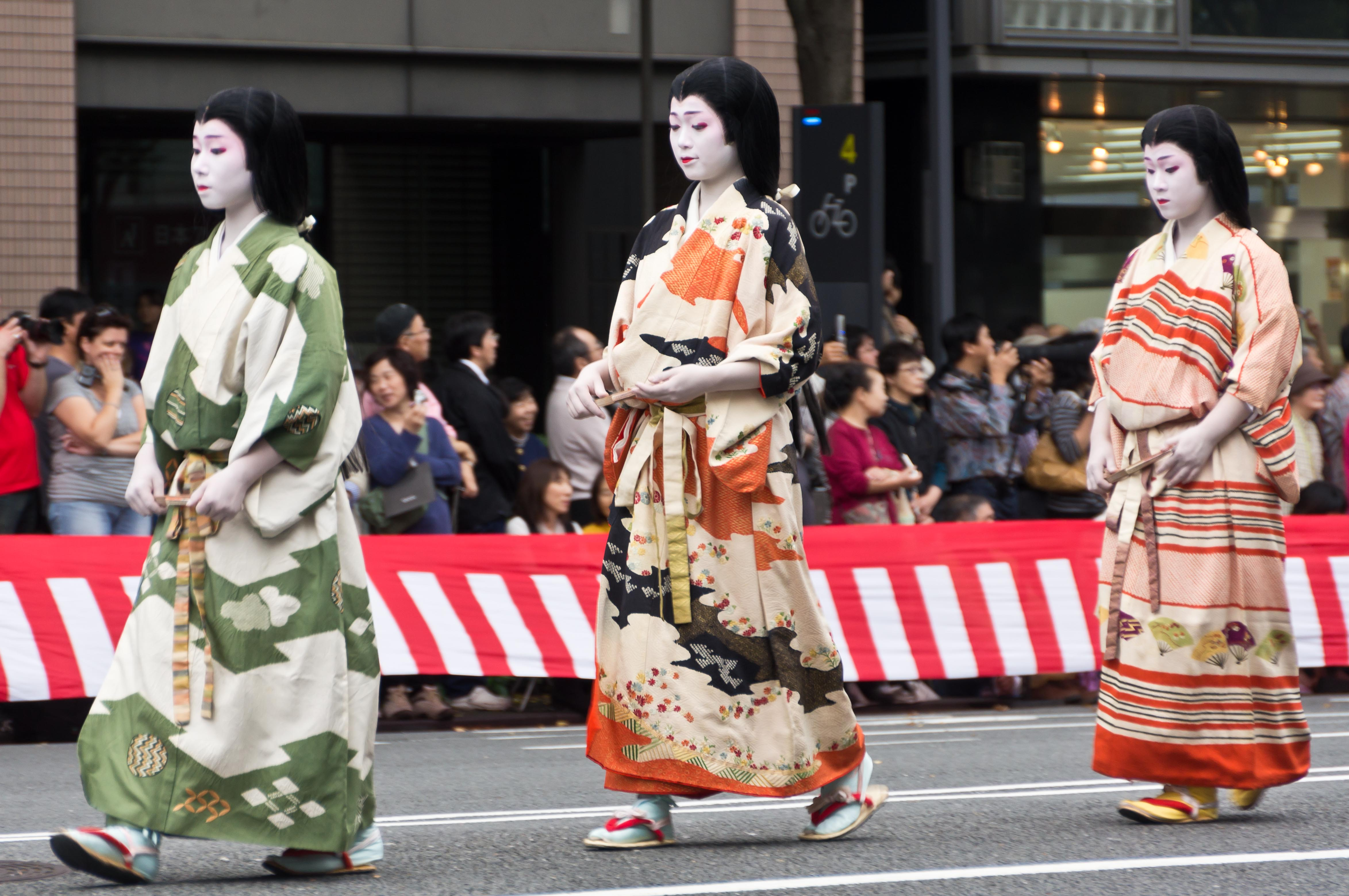
Re-enactors wearing kosode at the Jidai Matsuri in 2011

Comparison between a kosode (left) and a modern-day kimono (right).

Parts of a kosode (clockwise from top): The collar (襟, eri); The sleeve (袖, sode); The body (身頃, migoro); The overlapping front panel (袵, okumi).

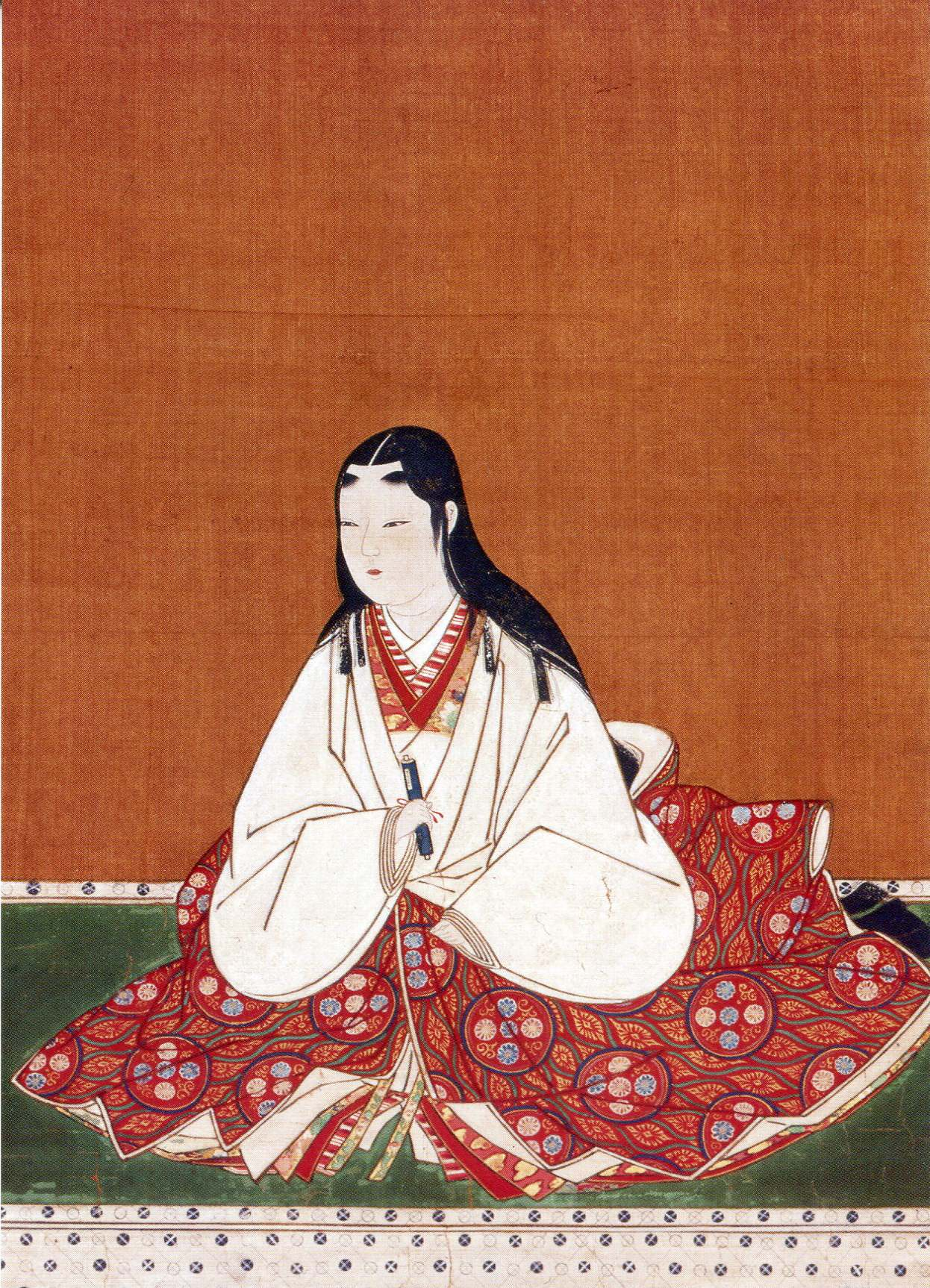
Oichi wearing a kosode with another kosode stripped off the shoulders.

The kosode (小袖, lit. 'small sleeves') was a type of short-sleeved Japanese garment, and the direct predecessor of the kimono. Though its component parts directly parallel those of the kimono, its proportions differed, typically having a wider body, a longer collar and narrower sleeves. The sleeves of the kosode were typically sewn to the body entirely, and often featured heavily rounded outer edges.

The kosode was worn in Japan as common, everyday dress from roughly the Kamakura period (1185–1333) until the latter years of the Edo period (1603–1867), at which a point its proportions had diverged to resemble those of modern-day kimono; it was also at this time that the term kimono, meaning "thing to wear", first came into use when referring to the garment formerly known as the kosode.

== History ==
Originating in the Heian period as an undergarment for both men and women, the kosode was a plain white garment, typically made of silk, worn directly next to the skin. Both men and women wore layered, wrap-fronted, wide-sleeved robes on top of the kosode, with the style of layering worn by women of the Imperial Japanese court – known as the jūnihitoe, literally "twelve layers" – featuring a greater number of robes than were seen on men. The kosode would also be worn as sleeping wear alongside a pair of hakama.

Following dress edicts designed to decrease the number of layered garments worn at court, the kosode gradually became outerwear from roughly the Kamakura period onwards. Styles of wearing the kosode – such as layering two kosode and wearing the uppermost robe stripped off from the shoulders – became popular, alongside a number of newly-developed textile decoration techniques, such as dyeing and embroidery, used to decorate the garment.

Initially undyed, the dyed kosode came in the Muromachi period, peaked in popularity in the Momoyama period, and faded out in the Keicho period and Edo period. Methods used for decoration included kara-ori ("Chinese textile") silk fabrics, which mimicked embroidery through the use of floating silk yarns and gilt-paper strips, and the elaborate tsujigahana technique of combination dyework and embroidery, until both were restrained by sumptuary laws and the development of yuzen dyework.

The kosode's proportions – a wide body and comparatively narrow sleeves – gradually evened out over time, before coming to resemble those of a modern kimono around the Edo period. The sleeves on some women's kosode also got longer and began to detach from the body below the shoulder, a style allowing the obi to become wider over time.

== Components ==
The component parts of a kosode are roughly similar to those of a kimono, with the only major differences being the proportions of each aspect in comparison to those of a modern kimono. The width of the loom, and hence the tanmono (fabric bolt) used for kosode was significantly larger than that for kimono, and the sleeves and collar were also cut and hemmed to different widths.

In the Keichō period (1596–1615, just before the Edo period), the width of the fabric bolt used for a kosode was about 45 centimetres (18 in), and the sleeves were made of one-half tanmono width. The sode-guchi (cuff opening) was narrow, the erikatāki (width of the neck opening) was narrow, the eritake (collar length) was long, and the tate-zuma (length of skirt below the collar) was short.

- Sode (袖, lit. 'sleeve') – the sleeves of a kosode were comparatively short in both length and width, being for the most part attached to the body down the entire length, with a somewhat rounded edge below the wrist opening of each sleeve.
- Migoro (身頃, lit. 'body') – the body panels for the kosode were much wider in proportion, creating a distinctive dropped-shoulder appearance.
- Eri (襟, lit. 'collar') – the collar of the kosode was much wider than is seen on modern kimono, and was also relatively longer, forming a longer, shallower angle along the okumi.
- Okumi (袵) – the overlapping front panels. The okumi, due to the length and low placement of the collar, had a far more triangular appearance than the irregular quadrilateral okumi on modern kimono; this gave the kosode a sloping, low-waisted appearance.

== Gallery ==
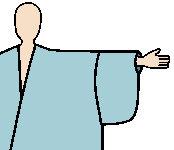
The short sleeve and wide shoulder popular in the Muromachi period and early Edo period

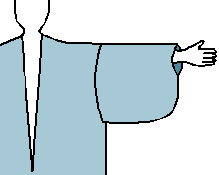
A wider kosode sleeve.

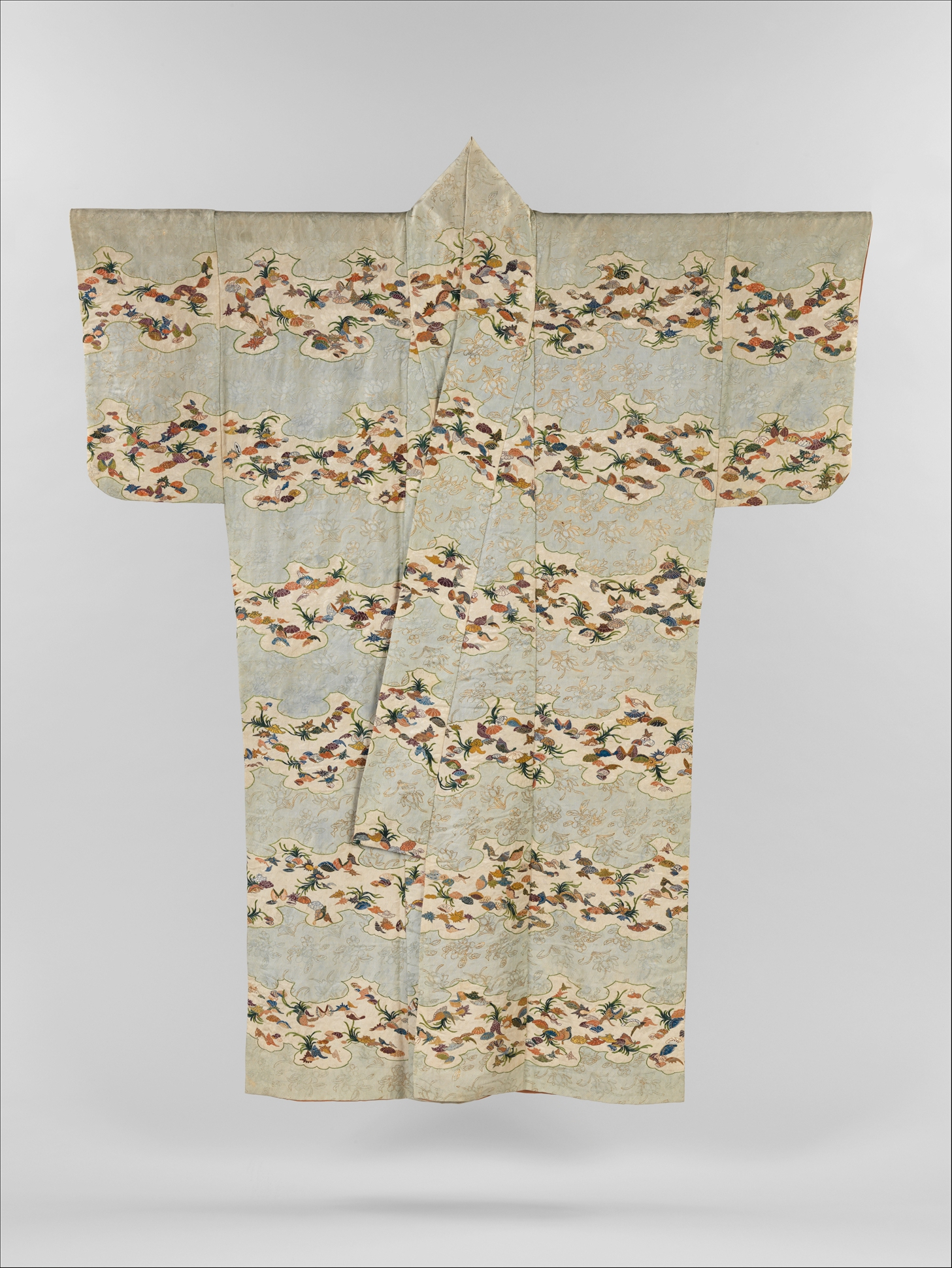
The unfolded width of this kosode's collar is similar to the length of its sleeves.

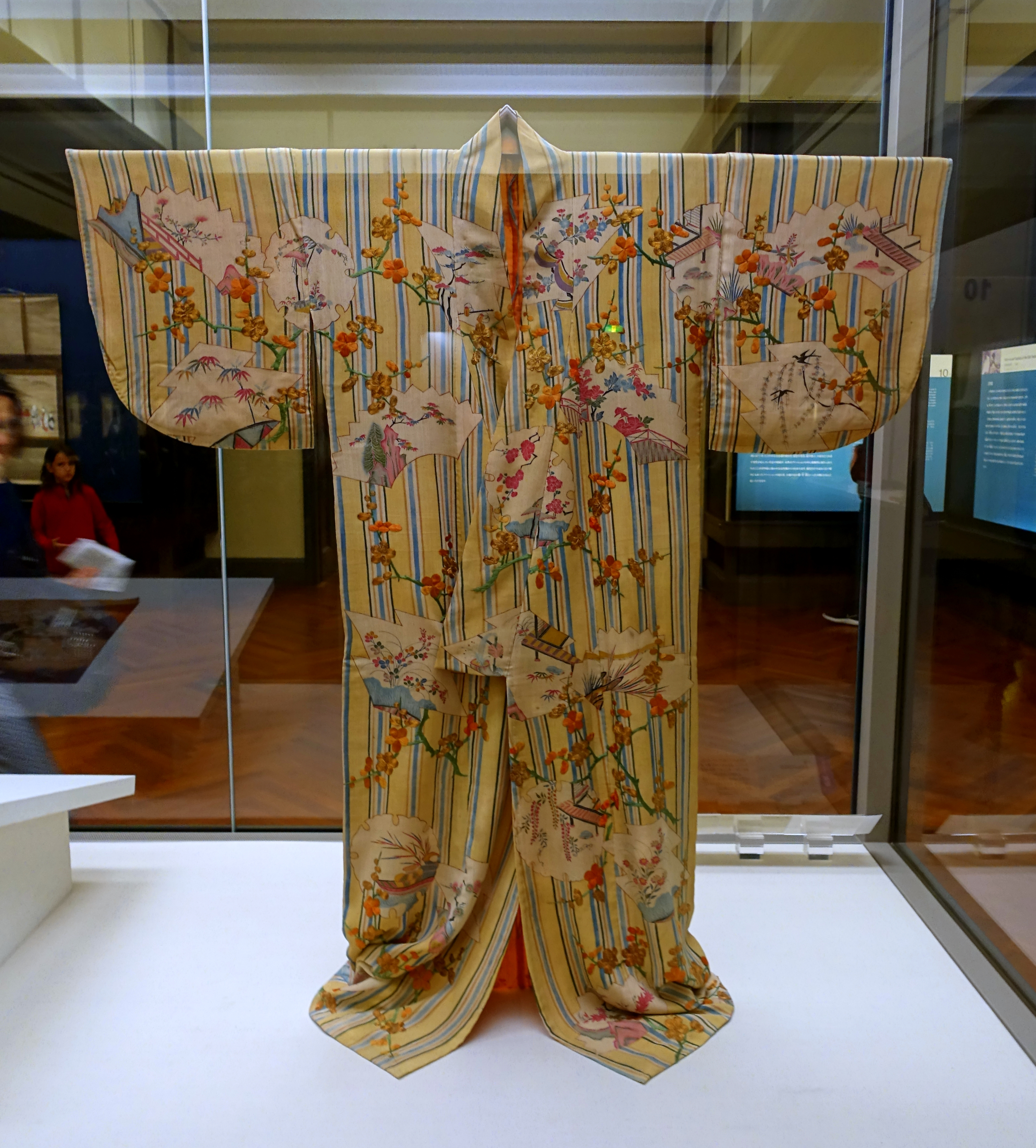
Kosode with yūzen dyework inside fan and snowflake shapes, 1700s, Ishikawa Prefectural Museum of Traditional Arts and Crafts

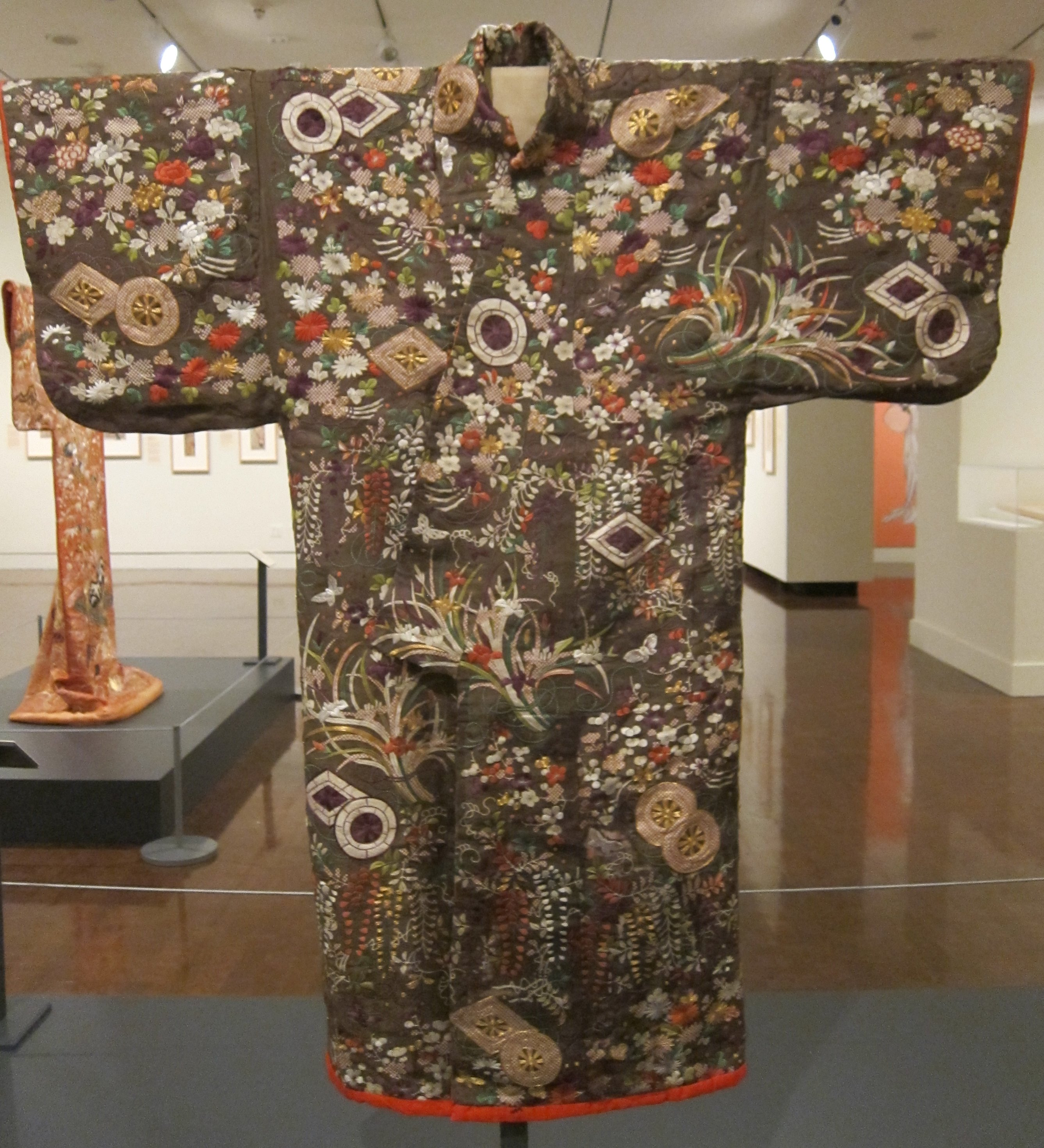
Kosode for a woman, late 18th century, Honolulu Museum of Art

Kosode with Mandarin orange tree design and auspicious characters, late 18th century, Metropolitan Museum of Art

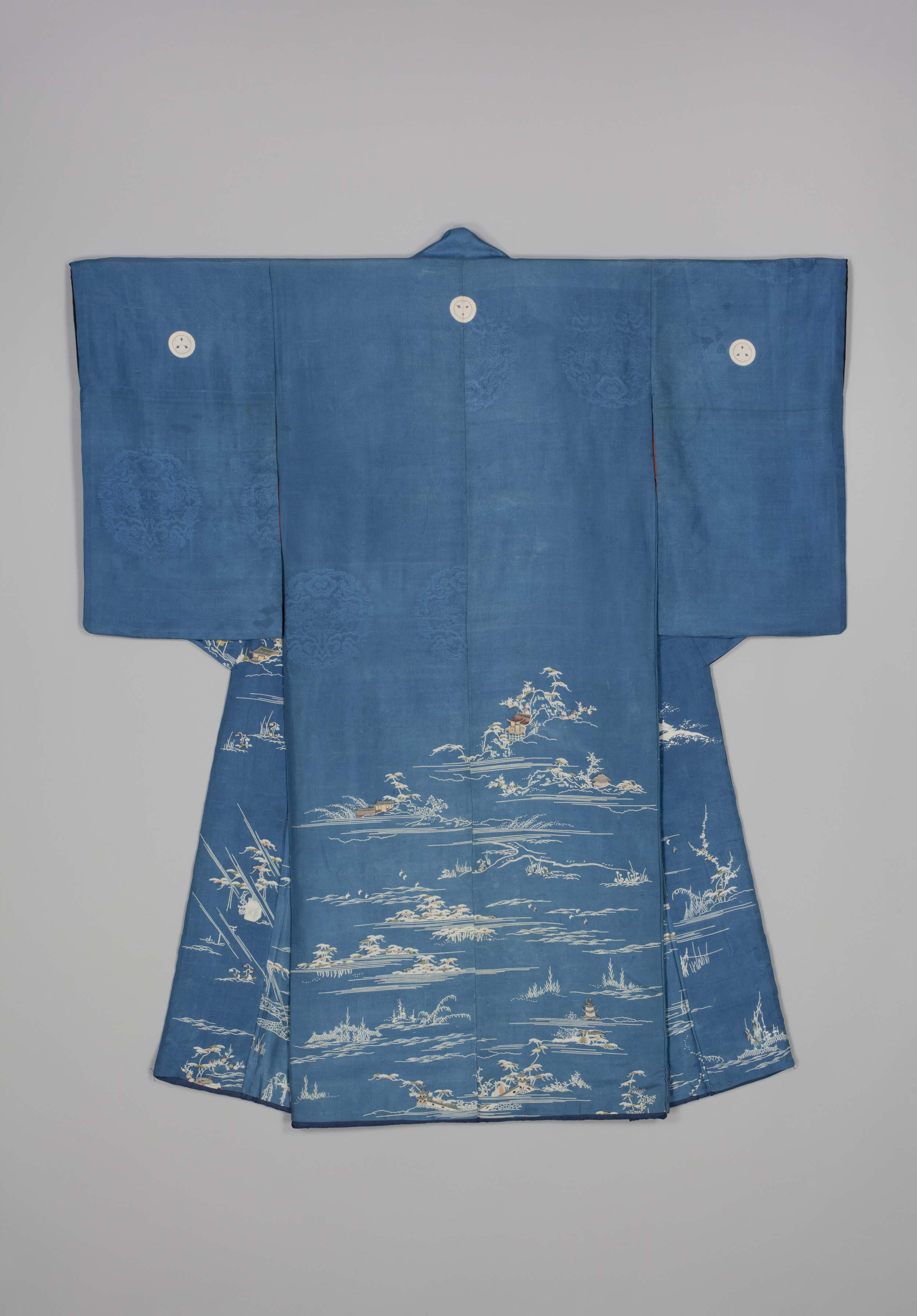
Kosode for a woman with design inspired by the Eight Views of Ōmi, 1780–1820, Khalili Collection of Kimono

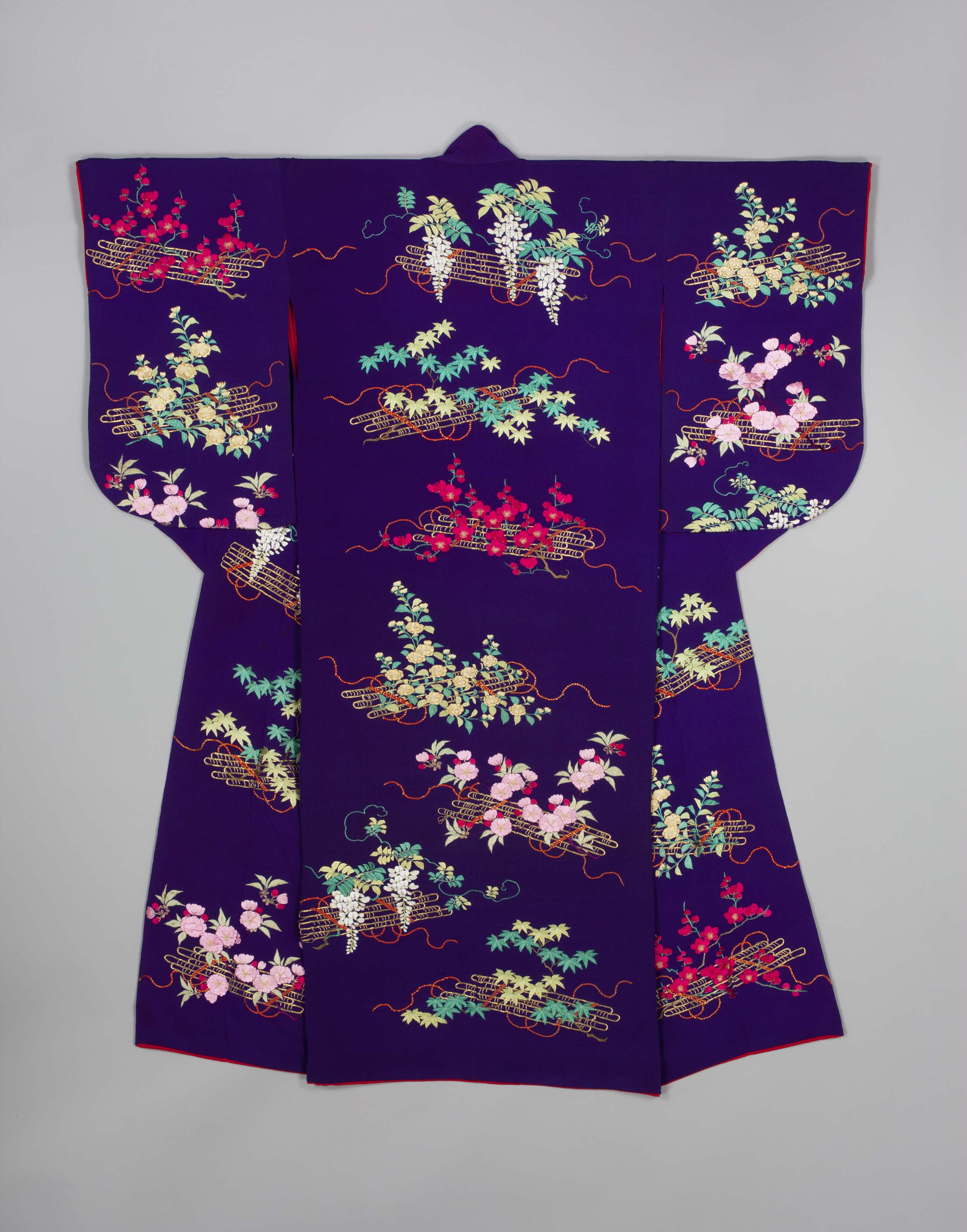
Kosode for a woman showing flowers on rafts, late 19th century, Khalili Collection of Kimono

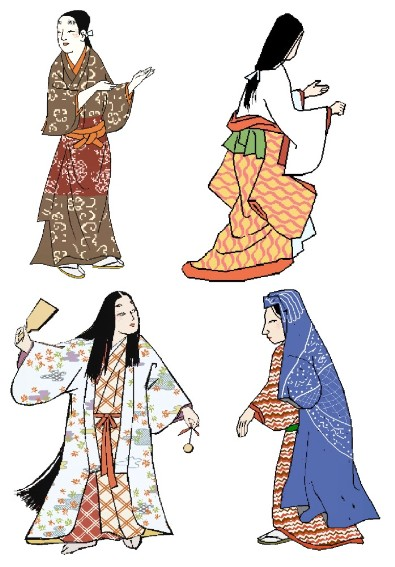
Ways of wearing kosode. Top left: worn as a wrap-front robe; top right: stripped off the shoulders in the koshimaki style; bottom left: worn as an unbelted robe over another kosode in the uchikake style; bottom right: worn over the head in the katsugi style.

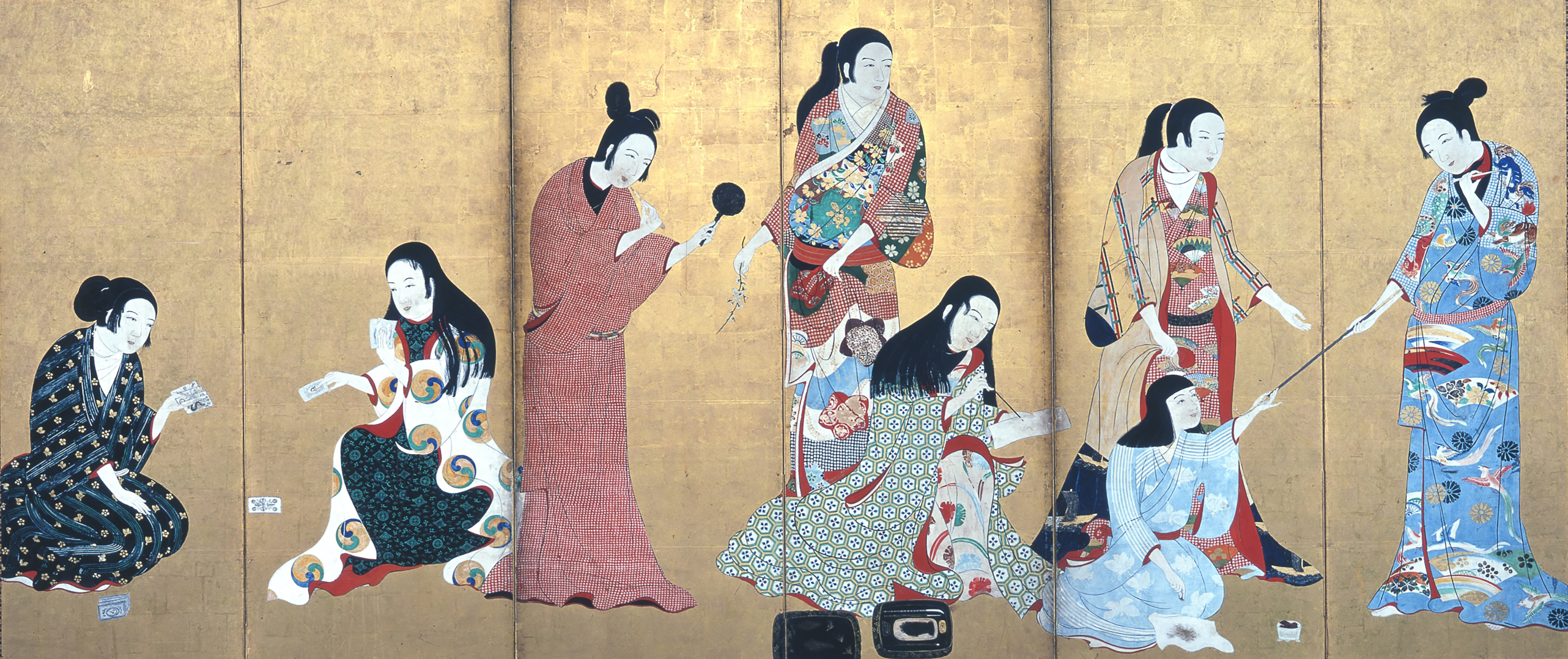
The kosode worn as outerwear. Note, compared to modern kimono, the wider cut of the body, unisex narrow obi and shorter sleeves. Matsuura byōbu, c. 1650, Azuchi-Momoyama period.

== See also ==
- List of items traditionally worn in Japan

== Bibliography ==
- Gluckman, Dale Carolyn, and Sharon Sadako Takeda, eds. When Art Became Fashion: Kosode in Edo-Period Japan. New York: Weatherhill, 1992.
- Kennedy, Alan. Japanese Costume: History and Tradition. New York: Rizzoli, 1990.
- Kosode: 16th–19th Century Textiles from the Nomura Collection. New York: Kodansha International, 1985.
