= Furisode =

Formal kimono with long sleeves for young women

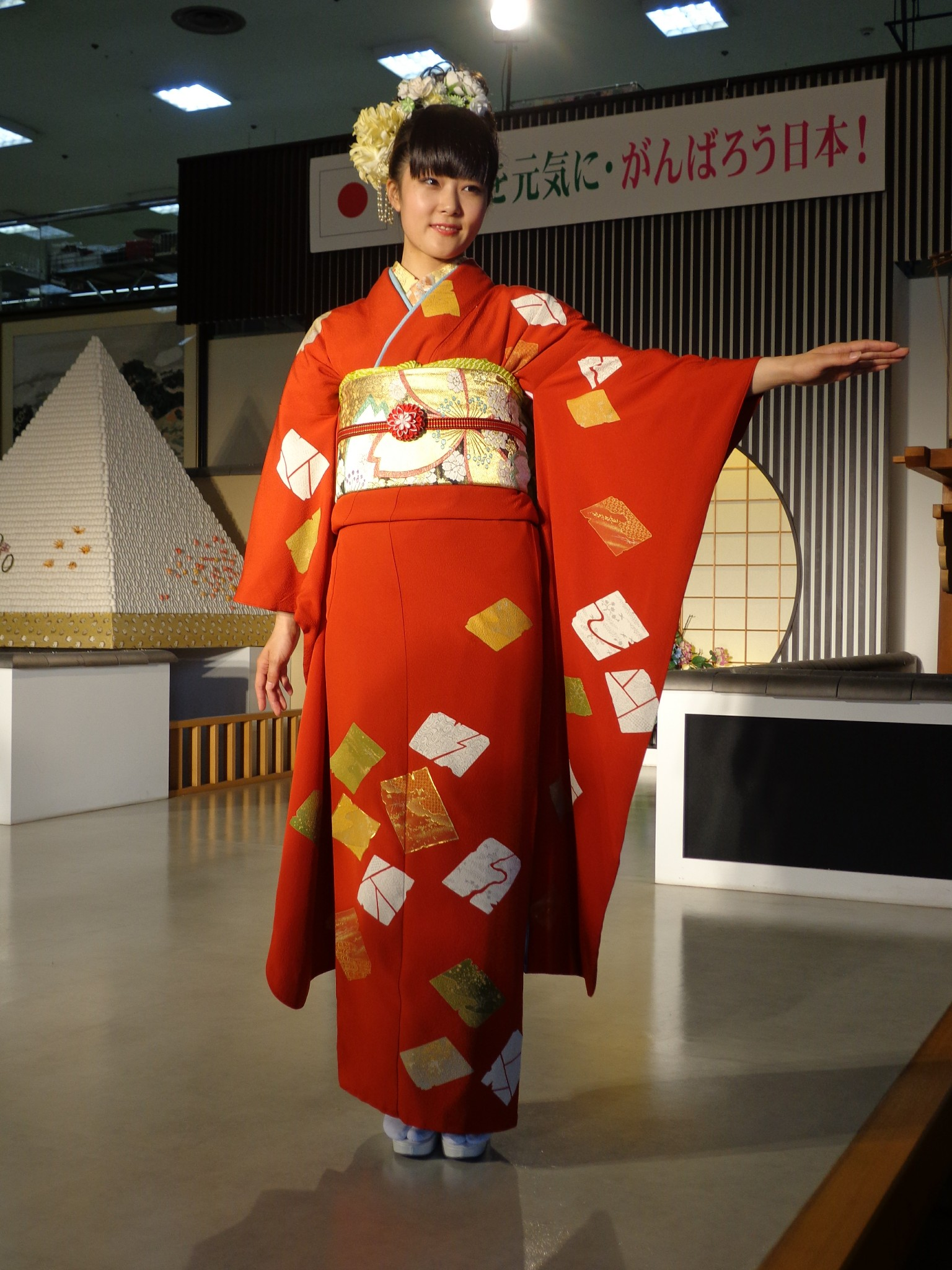
An unmarried Japanese woman wearing a furisode

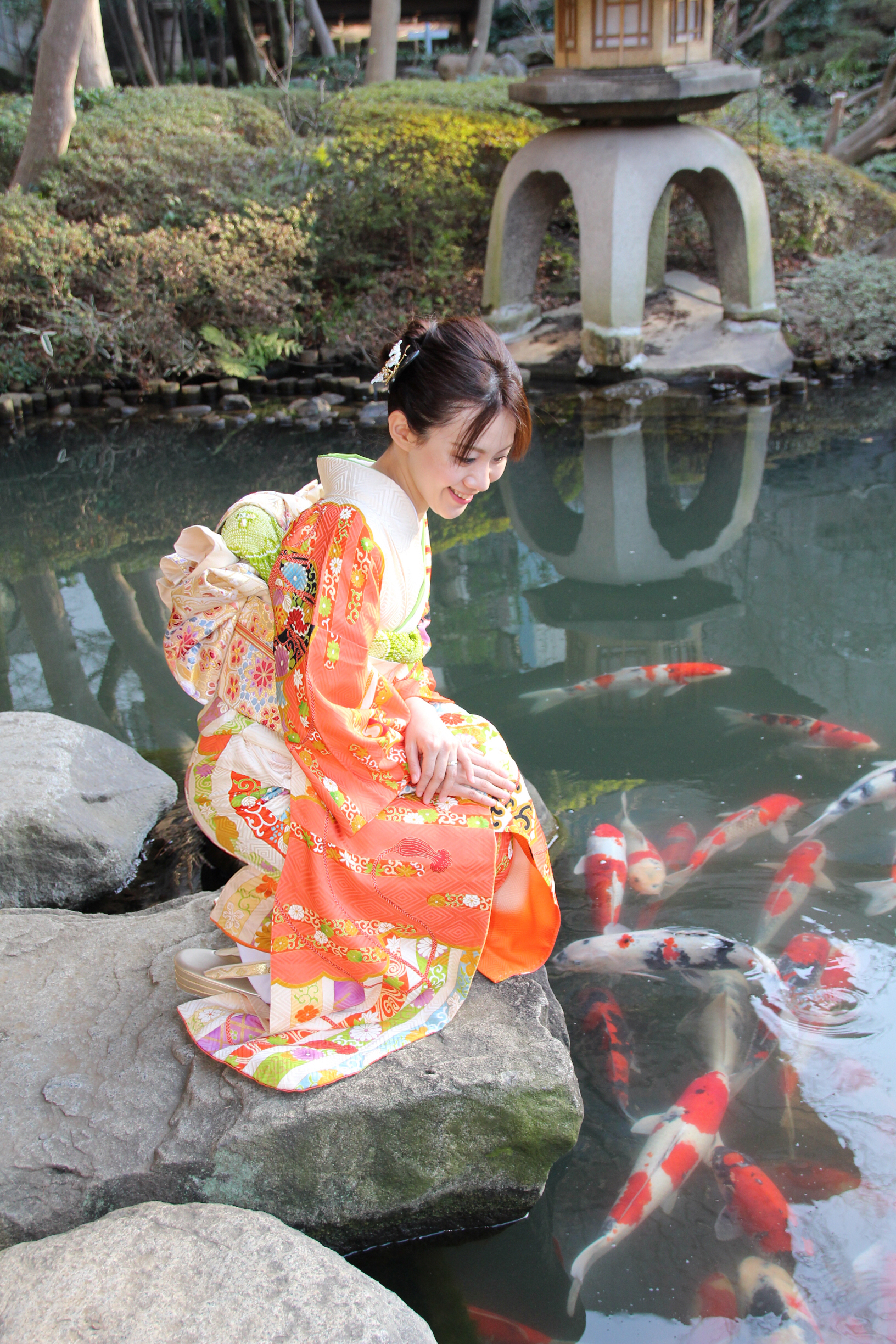
A Japanese woman wearing a furisode at a Japanese garden

A furisode (振袖, lit. 'swinging sleeves') is a style of kimono distinguishable by its long sleeves, which range in length from 85 cm (33 in) for a kofurisode (小振袖, lit. 'short swinging sleeve'), to 114 cm (45 in) for an ōfurisode (大振袖, lit. 'large swinging sleeves'). Furisode are the most formal style of kimono historically worn by young unmarried women in Japan.

The sleeves, like all women's kimono, are attached to the body of the kimono only at the shoulder, with the inner edge left open past the shoulder. This both allows the underkimono (juban) to show when worn, and also allows the obi to be tied around the body above the hips. Furisode, like other formal kimono, are mostly made from silk, and are decorated in bright colours to reflect the wearer's youth. Furisode are often either rented or bought by parents for their daughters to wear on Coming of Age Day in the year they turn 20.

In previous decades, in particular before WWII, only young unmarried women wore furisode, as marriage signified the end to a woman's single youth and the beginning of her transition into married life; higher rates of marriage at a younger age left few women unmarried past their mid-twenties, meaning that furisode were never seen on older unmarried women.

In the present day, furisode are by default considered to be formalwear, despite the existence of some yukata (informal summer kimono) with furisode-style sleeves; the furisode is generally worn for formal social functions such as tea ceremonies and weddings.

Formality guidelines for kimono have also relaxed, to the point that the divide between wearing furisode and other types of formal kimono is now one more of age, rather than marital status, with furisode being a youthful garment worn by young women through their early twenties. Women past their early twenties generally wearing shorter sleeved kimono instead. Both married and unmarried young women also have the choice to wear other types of formal kimono to formal events, such as the short sleeved iro-tomesode, as well as wearing formal Western clothing rather than kimono.

== In popular culture ==
It is common for women to wear a furisode on their "coming of age day".

== History ==
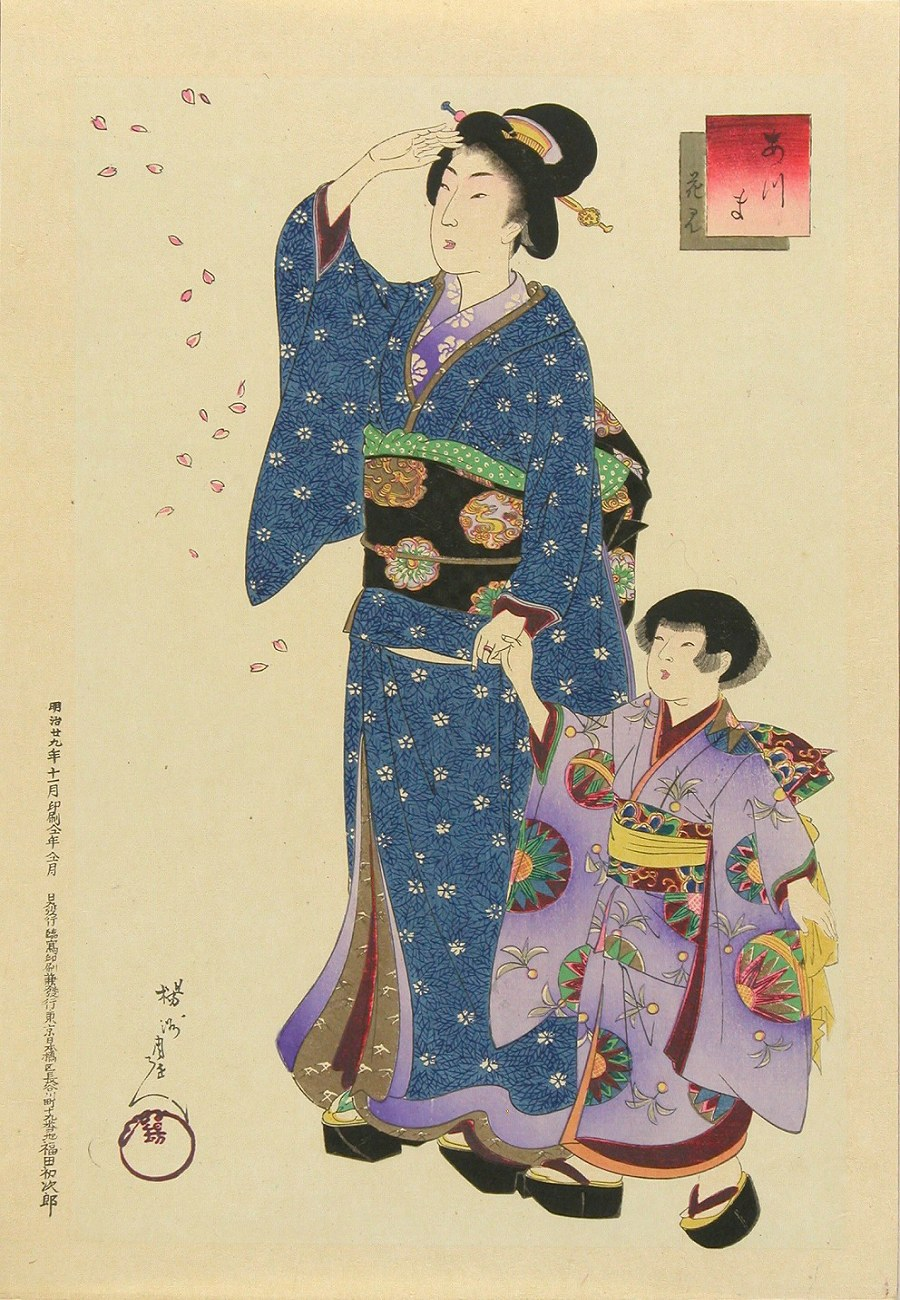
A girl wearing a 19th century furisode, with her mother (Yōshū Chikanobu, c. 1896)

The furisode originated in the mid-1500s as middle- and upper-class children's clothing, worn by both boys and girls; it was not worn by adults. Initially, the furisode had relatively short sleeves, and was used as everyday wear by those who could afford it. Over time, as the sleeves lengthened and became more exaggerated, the furisode became a style of kimono worn mostly to special occasions. According to one 17th-century text, boys could wear furisode until their 18th year, or until they went through their coming-of-age ceremony, which usually occurred in late adolescence. Girls were supposed to cease wearing the furisode upon marriage, or upon reaching their 20th year.

Initially, furisode did not differ noticeably between the sexes, but fabric designs started to become more gendered in the 19th century. In the 20th century, furisode became restricted to women and girls only, as part of the increasing gender-specificity of children's clothing that developed in the wake of Western influence. As the furisode became increasingly associated with young adult women, the term was removed from the shorter-sleeved children's garment, which acquired the more generic term wakiake ("open-sided").

== Gallery ==
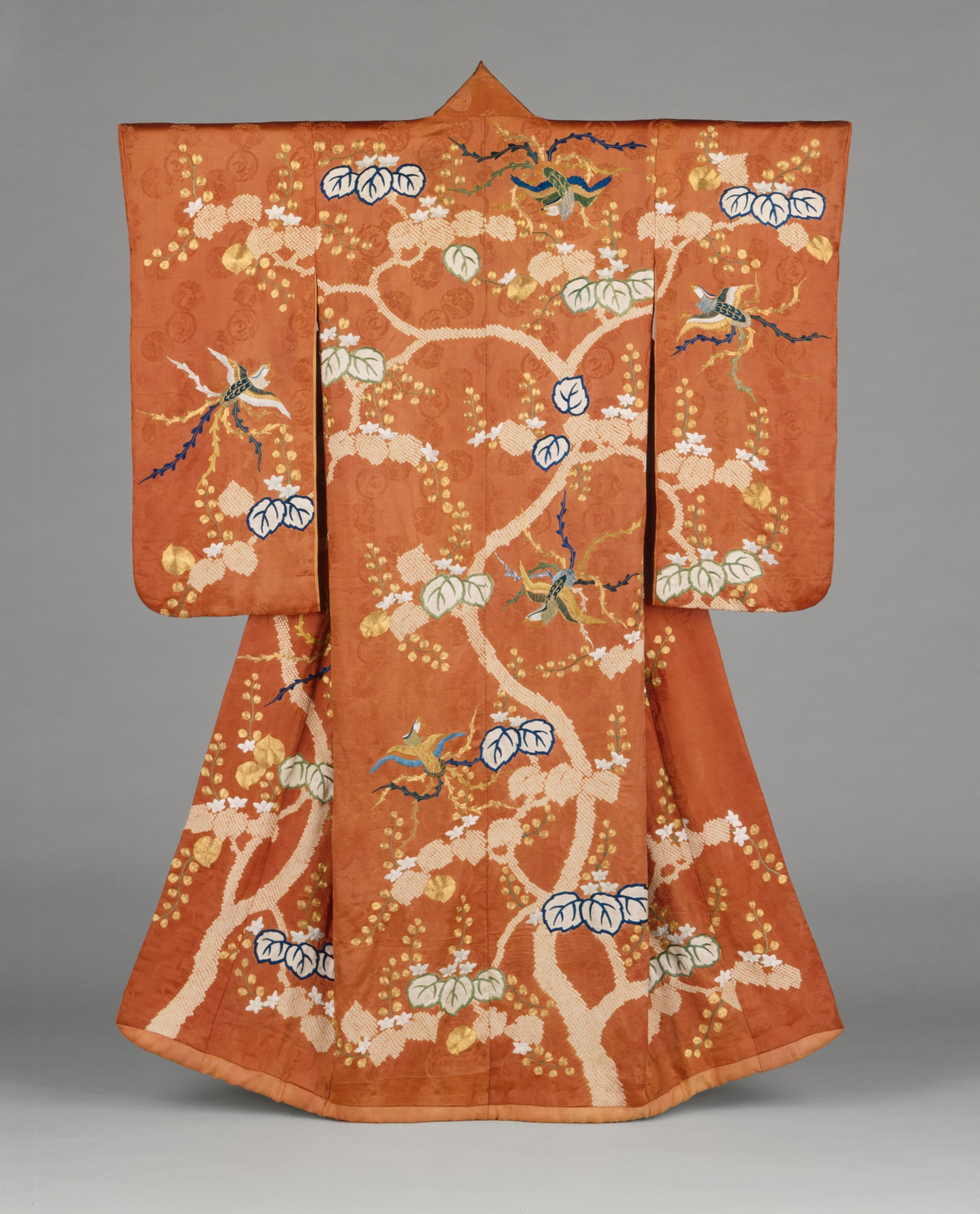
Furisode with paulownia tree and phoenix motifs, Late 18th-early 19th century, Los Angeles County Museum of Art

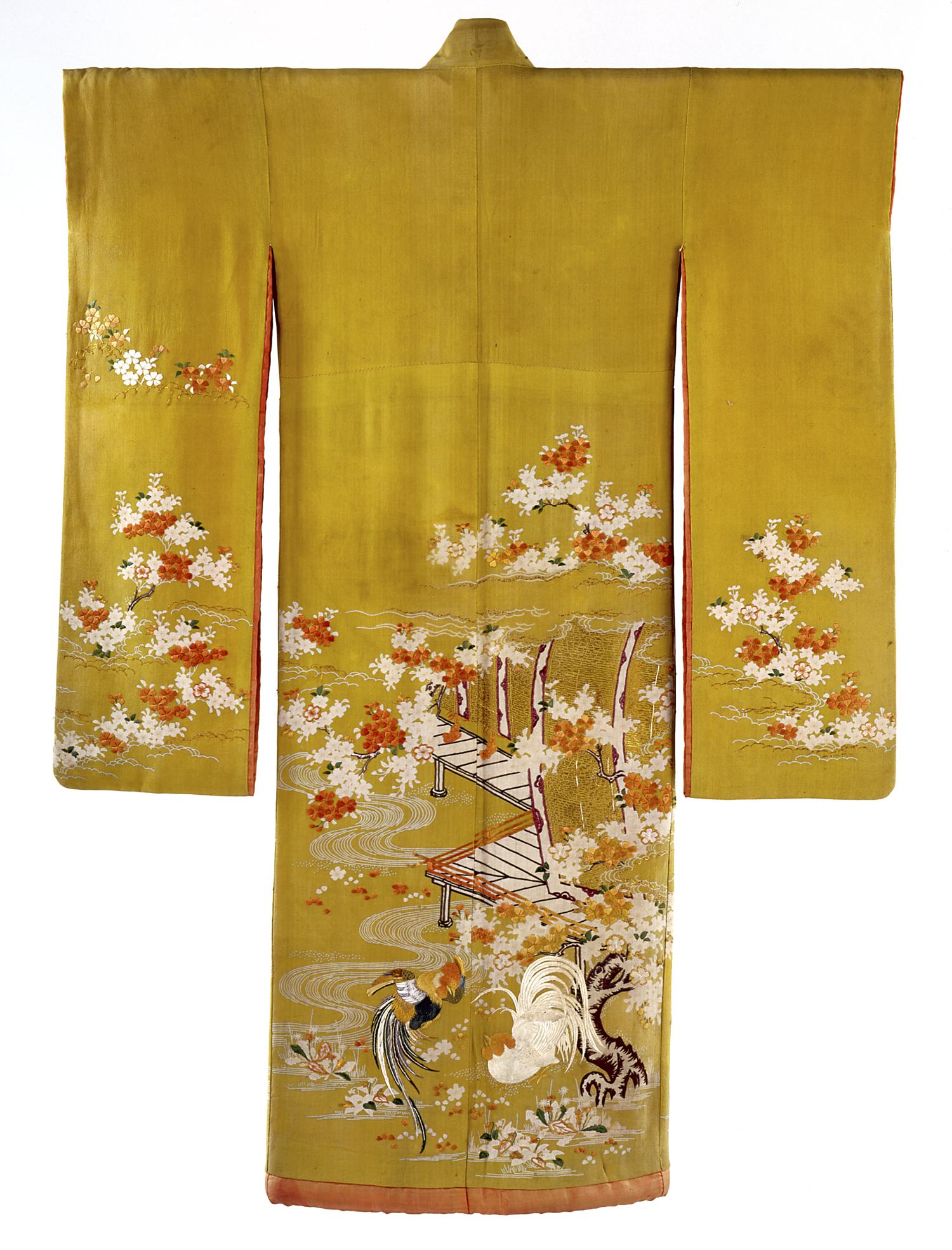
19th century furisode, Indianapolis Museum of Art

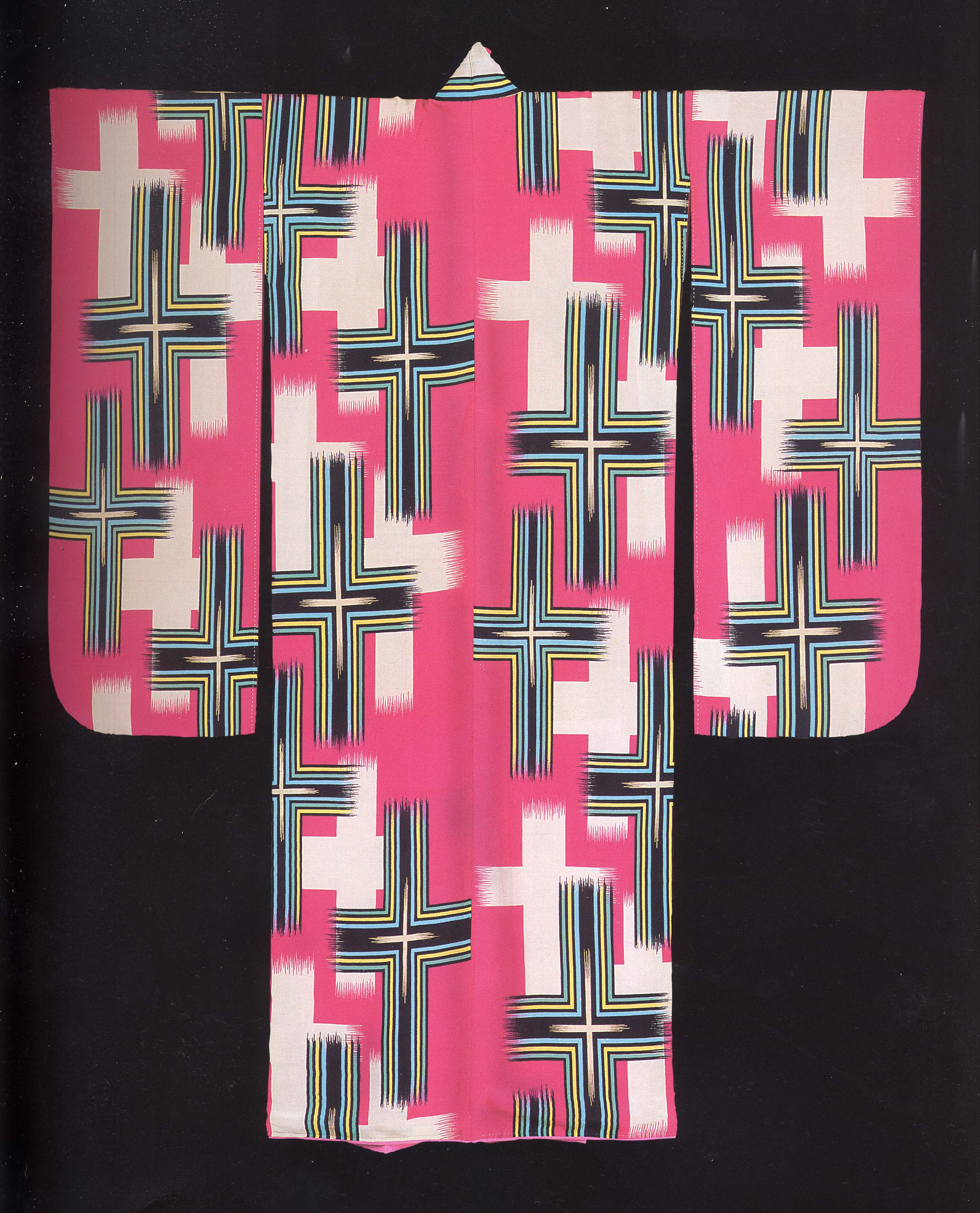
Furisode, Japan, 1920-1940, The Khalili Collection of Kimono

Furisode with replacement sleeves, 1930s, Textile Museum (George Washington University)

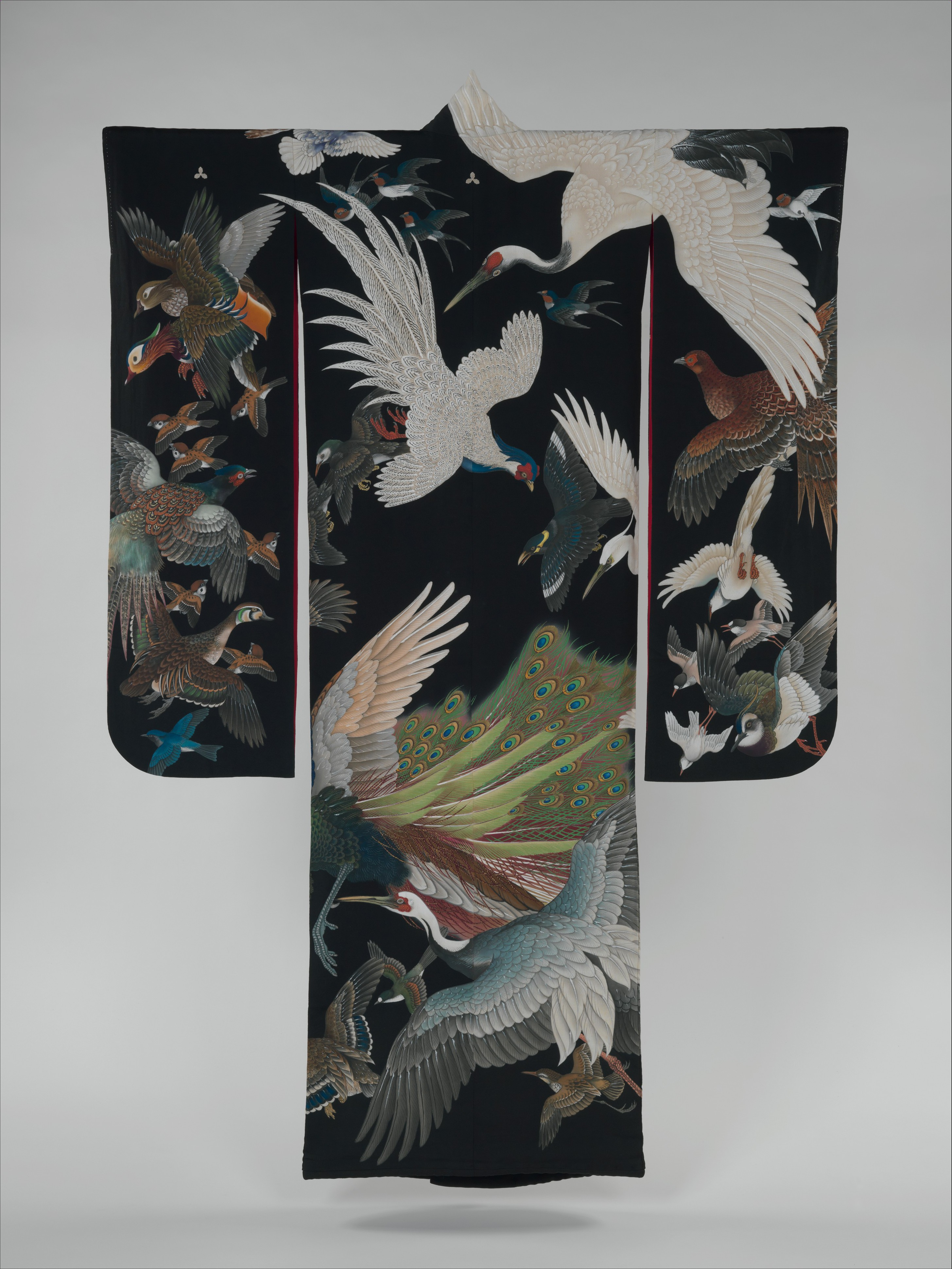
Kimono with birds in flight, 1942, Metropolitan Museum of Art

== See also ==
- Yukata
- Kimono
