= Khalili Collection of Kimono =

Private collection of Japanese kimono

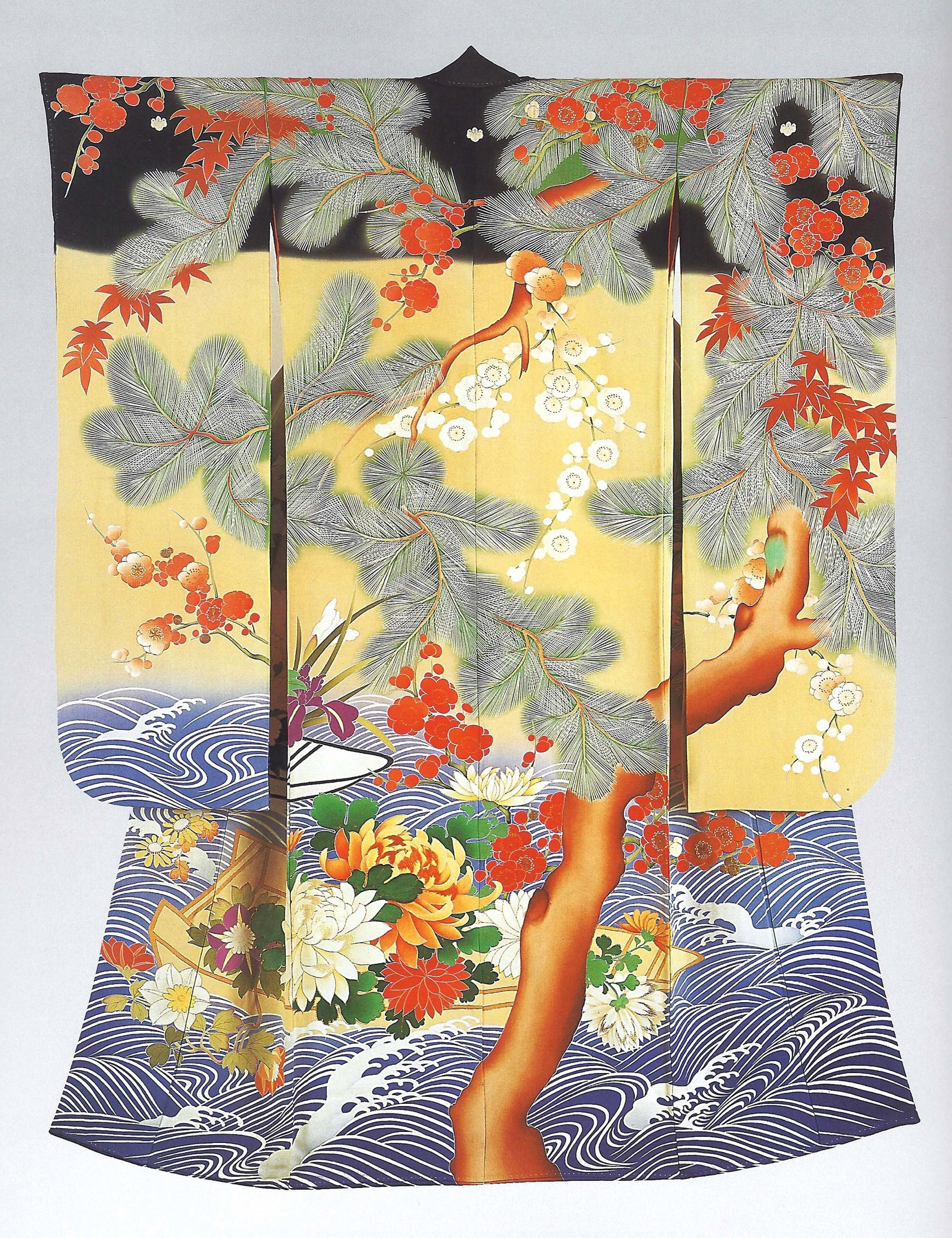
- Kimono for a young woman (furisode), Japan, 1912–1926
- Curators: Nasser D. Khalili (founder); Dror Elkvity (curator and chief co-ordinator); Anna Jackson (honorary curator)
- Size (no. of items): 450
- Website: www.japanesekimono.art

The Khalili Collection of Kimono is a private collection of more than 450 Japanese kimono assembled by the British scholar, collector and philanthropist Nasser D. Khalili. It is one of eight collections assembled, published and exhibited by Khalili, each of which is considered to be among the most important collections within their respective fields.

The Khalili Collection of Kimono includes formal, semi-formal, and informal kimono made for men, women, and children, illustrating the evolution of the kimono through cut, construction, materials, and decorative techniques from the 17th through the 20th centuries, with kimono representing the Edo period, the Meiji period, the Taishō period, and the Shōwa period. The kimono within the collection are not on permanent display, but are periodically lent or donated in part to cultural institutions; including the Kremlin Museums in Moscow and the Victoria and Albert Museum in London. Khalili, who also owns a collection of Meiji-era Japanese art, describes kimono as "one of the wonders of the world." He started the kimono collection with the aim of collecting and cataloguing cultural works that were not already actively being collected.

== Kimono ==
"Kimono" literally means "thing to wear on the shoulders", and originally referred to clothing in general rather than a specific garment. Clothing similar to the kimono was first introduced to Japan in the 7th century through frequent interaction between Japan and mainland China. The exchange of envoys between the two countries led to the Japanese Imperial Court adopting Chinese culture, including, among others, clothing, which consisted of wrapped-front garments with long sleeves of both a closed-neck and open-neck nature. The halting of envoy missions in the Heian period led to the stronger independent development of Japanese culture, including the further development of clothing into the kimono-like garment known as the kosode. Over time, the kosode became the predominant garment within Japan, developing from the Azuchi-Momoyama period onwards into the garment known as the kimono today.

Kimono are made from long, thin bolts of cloth known as tanmono, are sewn with mostly straight seams, and are held together by small ties known as koshihimo and an obi belt. While Western clothing styles emphasise the body of the wearer, kimono have a distinctive T-shape which conceals more of the wearer's body, but provides, on the back and along the hem, a large area for decoration with patterns or motifs. Kimono are commonly decorated with motifs of either seasonal, cultural or religious significance, with some auspicious groupings of motifs — such as the Three Friends of Winter — being commonly seen on kimono worn to formal events such as weddings. Motifs may also refer to folklore, classical literature or popular culture, and sometimes include visual puns. Kimono differ slightly in construction for men, women and children, and the choice of fabric, colour and decorative techniques can signify the wearer's age, gender, formality of occasion and — less commonly — marital status. Variations of fabric type, weight and lining exist for different seasons, with unlined and sometimes sheer kimono being worn in the summer.

Contrary to popular belief, the variation and experimentation visible in the history of kimono shows that kimono were - and remain to this day - a fashion system and industry, with its own rapidly-changing popular styles and trends, whereas this used to be thought of as a Western phenomenon.

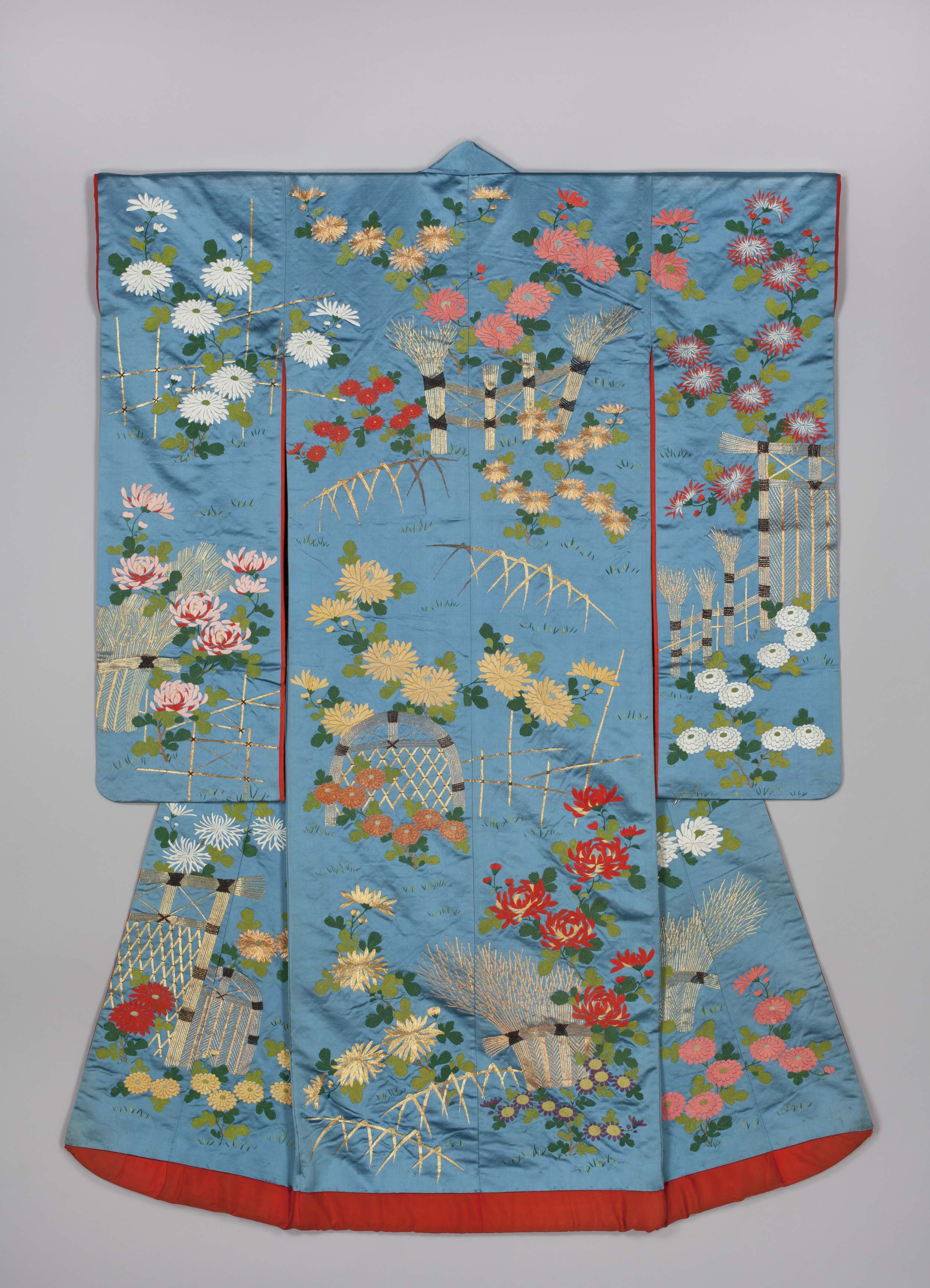
Over-kimono for a high-class young woman (uchikake), Japan, 1840–1870

The different forms of kimono represented in the Khalili Collection include the furisode ("swinging sleeve"; a formal kimono for young women), the kosode ("short sleeve"; the term used for all forms of short-sleeved garments before the usage of the word "kimono") and the uchikake (a formal outer kimono worn unbelted, typically by brides to weddings).

== Edo period (1603–1868) ==
The Collection includes kimono and related garments from the Edo period, which saw a rise in a wide variety of designs and decorative techniques, particularly on kimono designed for women. Though the main consumers of expensive and highly-decorated kimono at the beginning of the Edo period were the military class, who used lavish clothing and other luxurious to signify their place in the social hierarchy, the rise of the wealthy merchant classes throughout the rest of the Edo period fuelled lower-class demand for increasingly elaborate clothing. This included the development of sophisticated methods of weaving, dyeing, and embroidery, with women in particular adopting brighter and bolder designs in their clothing; in previous eras, both men's and women's kimono had been relatively similar in appearance. Though everyday kimono would have been woven and sewn by women at home, the most elaborate examples of kimono produced within this time period were designed and created by specialist craftsmen and artists who were typically men.

Garments outside of the samurai classes within the collection feature rich decoration from the waist-down only, with family crests on the neck and shoulders, a style known as tsuma moyō. These were worn by women of the merchant class, who in later years dressed in kimono more subdued than those of the samurai, despite following the same colour trends and naturalistic designs; with the introduction of dress edicts designed to oppress the merchant and socially-lower classes throughout the Edo period, an aesthetic style known as iki developed, emphasising subdued displays of luxury and wealth over the obvious presentation of money shown through the clothing worn by the samurai classes. Red became a popular colour for merchant-class women, partly because of its cultural association with youth and passion, and partly for its expensive dye, derived from the safflower; a bright red garment would have been an ostentatious display of wealth, examples of which are found throughout the collection. Worn by less wealthy merchants, lower down the social scale, are kimono made of cotton or ramie and dyed with indigo dye, with less dense designs but still a variety of dyes, patterns and techniques.

As well as merchant-class pieces, the Collection also includes examples of formal samurai women's kimono; despite the militant connection, these are patterned with flowers, geometric patterns, or motifs such as clouds or waves. However, some examples within the collection do display the military status of the samurai, seen by way of example on a bright red kimono illustrated with gunbai war fans. Samurai men typically dressed with a more understated style, exemplified by items in the collection featuring geometric designs concentrated around the waist.

Another kind of kimono specific to the military elite was the goshodoki, or "palace court style", which would be worn in the residence of a military leader (a shōgun or daimyō). These kimono - also featured in the collection - featured landscape scenes, commonly accompanied by motifs referencing classical literature, and symbolism referencing stories made popular amongst the upper classes through Noh plays.

The collection also features some examples of yogi, or sleeping kimono, known to have been owned by samurai families; a type of thickly-wadded, wearable bedding, samurai yogi featured elaborate designs in garments made of silk in contrast to the typically simple and almost-entirely cotton examples used by the lower classes.

Examples of Japanese garments created during this time period using imported Indian fabrics are also found in the collection. Indian fabrics, brought to Japan by Dutch importers, were received with enthusiasm and found many uses; the collection includes a flamboyant under-kimono for a man made by combining these finely-patterned fabrics with plain-weave silk and cotton. Other items show that Japanese designers started printing designs influenced by the Indian patterns independently, and that fabrics imported from France or Britain were also used to make kimono; ownership of these textiles would have signified both wealth and cultural taste, though the example found in the collection of a kimono using these fabrics is an undergarment, where the fabric would not have been seen once worn.

Examples of Edo period kimono with the Khalili Collection
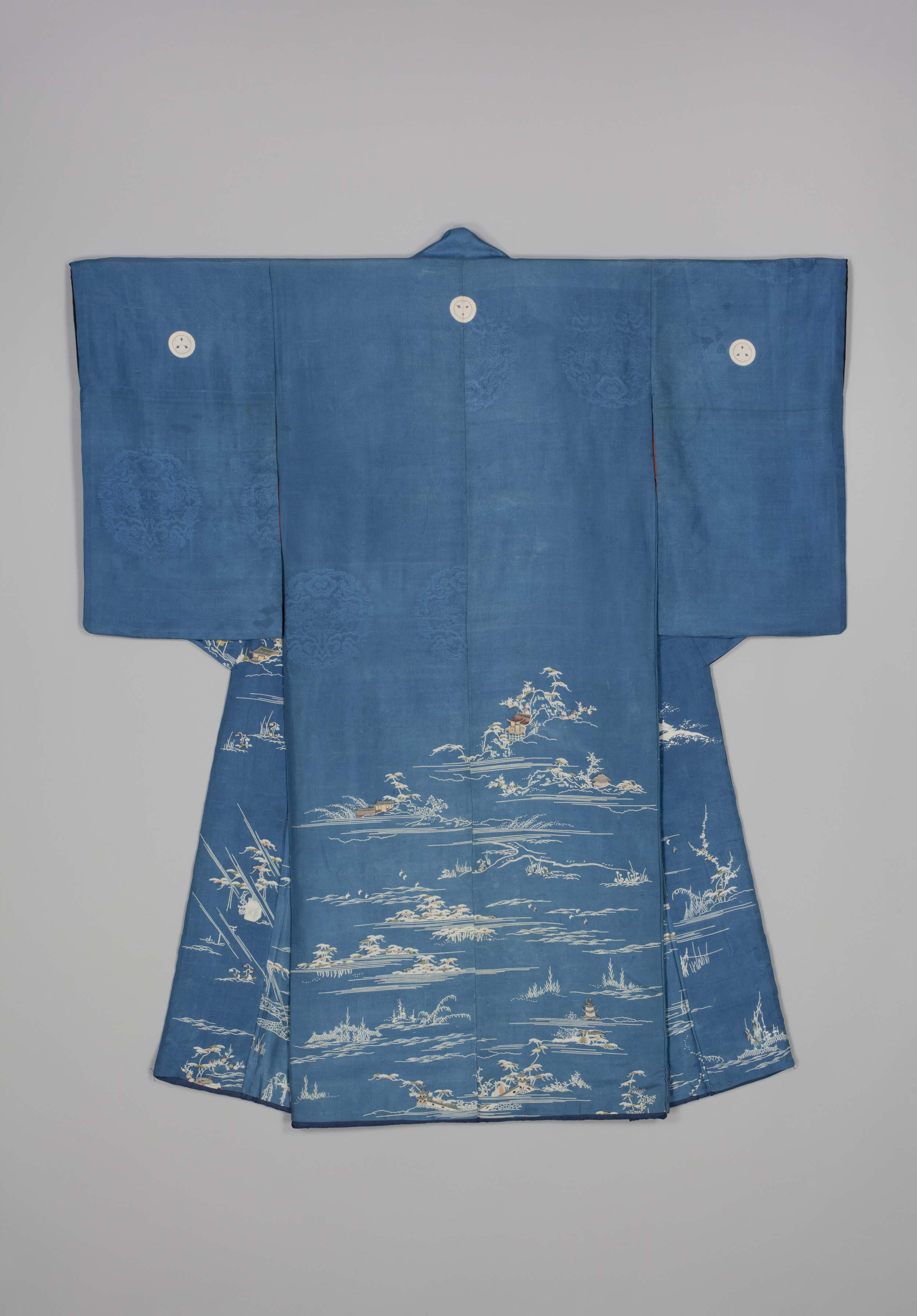
Kimono for a woman (kosode) with a design inspired by the Eight Views of Ōmi, 1780–1820

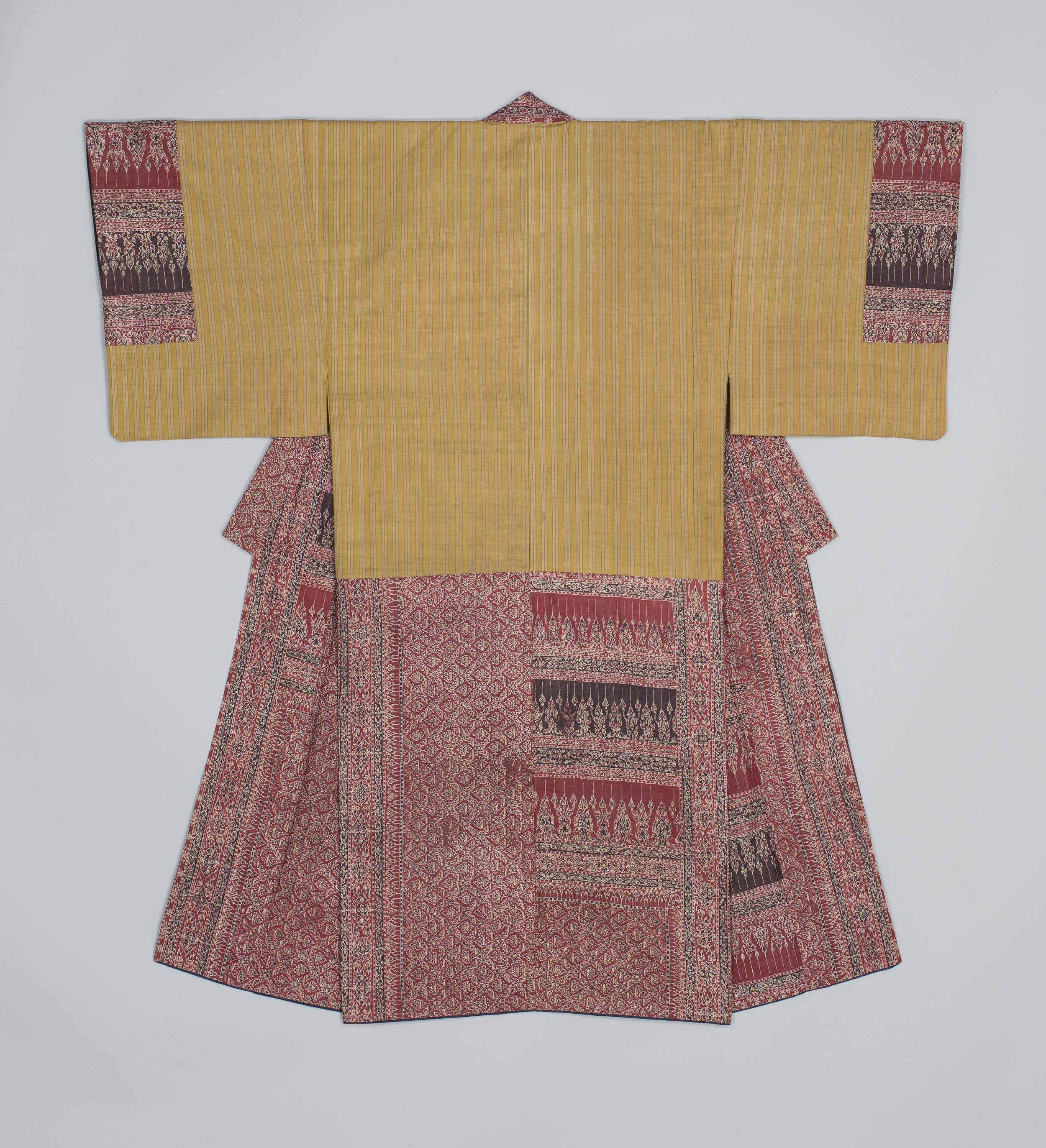
Underkimono for a man (juban) using imported Indian fabrics, 1800–1850

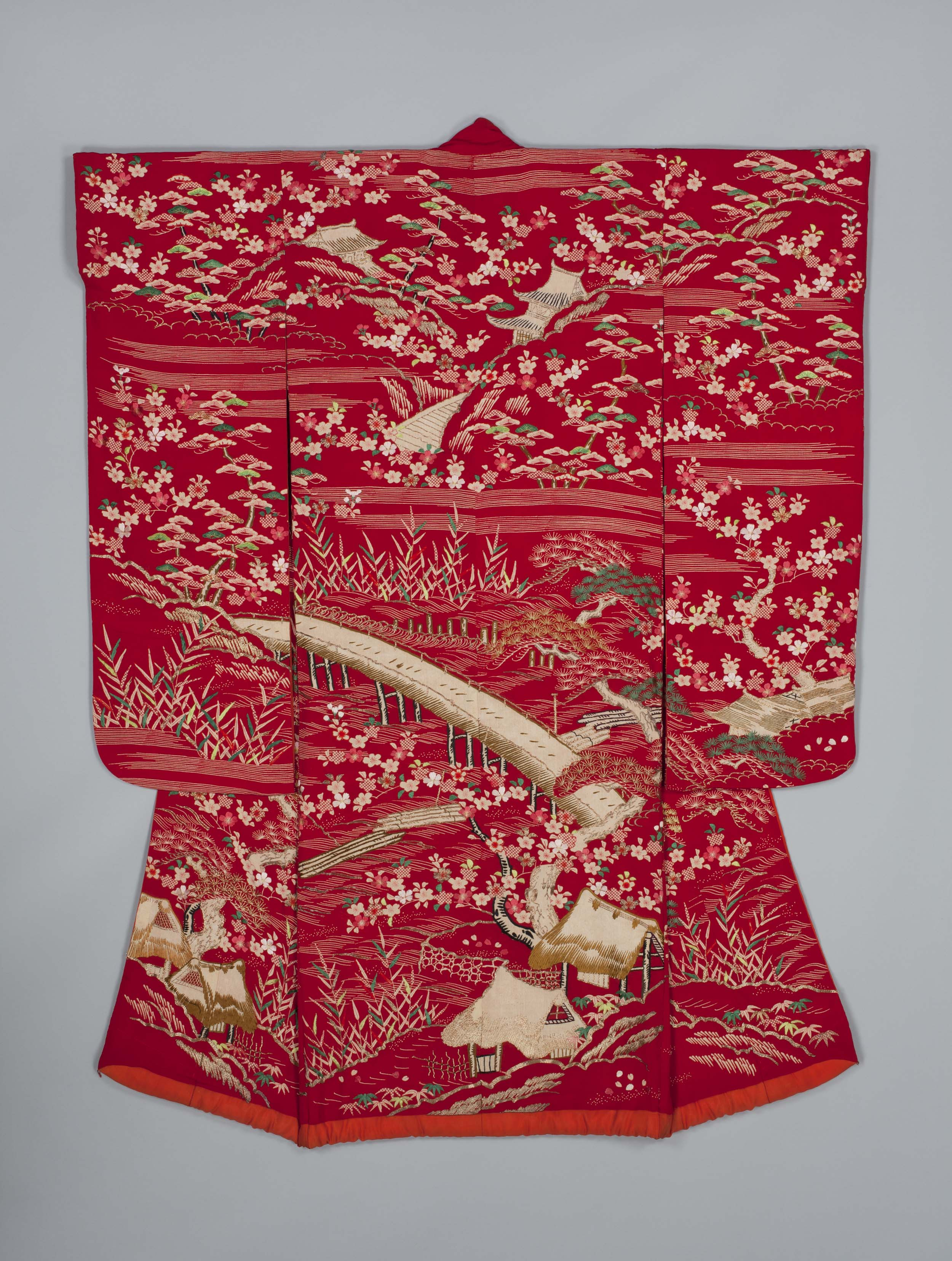
Outer kimono for a high-class young woman (uchikake); landscape scene with bridge, pavilions and thatched huts, 1840–1870

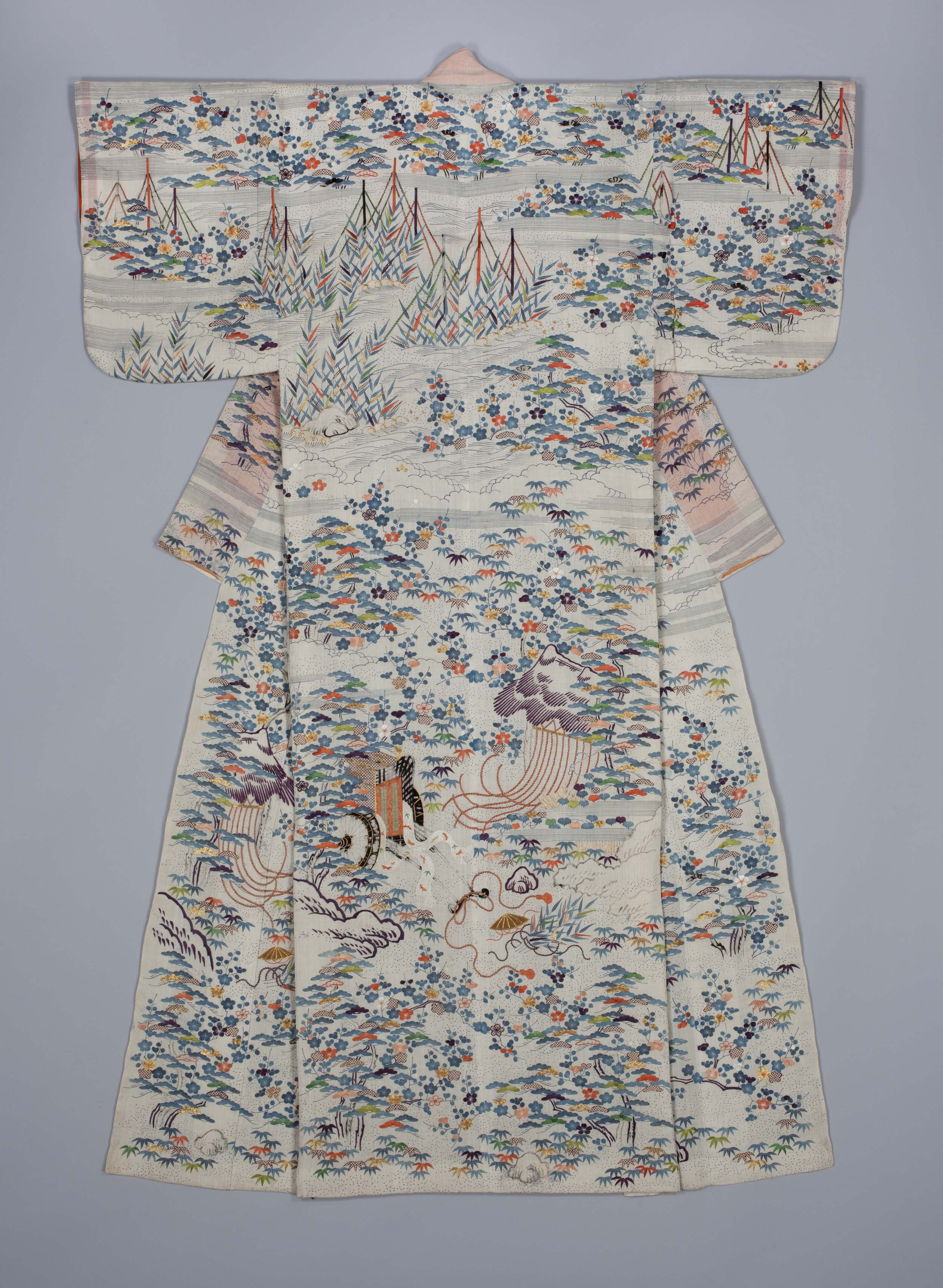
Summer kimono for a woman depicting a landscape with fishing nets, 1820–1850

== Meiji period (1868–1912) ==
Kimono from the Meiji period are also represented in the Collection. The Meiji period was defined by its drive towards both Westernisation and industrialisation, kickstarted by Japan opening its borders to the world in the 1860s, and this saw the rapid import of Western culture, clothing and technologies, including the introduction of synthetic dyestuffs to Japan; the first synthetic dye, mauveine, had been invented in the previous decade.

Japan's newly-opened border also saw the export of Japanese culture to the West, where the kimono became an object of fascination. The Japanese textile industry rapidly Westernised in the face of foreign weaving technologies, and silk from Tokyo's factories became the principle export of Japan.

With the introduction of cheaper and faster manufacture, more people could now afford silk kimono, and designers were able to create new patterns using the new methods of production. However, Emperor Meiji issued a proclamation promoting Western dress over the allegedly effeminate Japanese dress, leading to the introduction of Western-style clothing within the public sphere, with some men typically adopting Western dress in the workplace (despite both women and men continuing to wear the kimono within the home) and most women continuing to wear the kimono in everyday life. Despite the introduction of Western dress, the kimono did not quickly fossilise as an object of tradition worn out of obligation by women and those unable to afford Western clothing; advertisements within Japan up until the 1940s display both the kimono and Western dress as items of fashionable wear, suggesting a more parallel evolution of the two within the Japanese wardrobe as equal, if differing, items of clothing.

Cheaper synthetic dyes in the following decades meant that both purples and red - previously restricted to the wealthy elite - could now be owned by anyone, though they retained their symbolic importance of representing wealth and power. These kimono are represented in the Collection, illustrating the evolution of Meiji period trends from subtle, grey-toned colours to a shift towards brighter and more vibrant designs at the end of the period.

Kimono also began to incorporate a number of Western motifs; a number featured in the Collection have a plain, bold colour, and feature an elaborate design around the hem, a common feature on Meiji period clothing; several have subtle colour gradients from the top to the bottom of the garment, a technique achieved through the dyeing technologies of the time. Another trend represented in the collection is both outer and inner garments of the same design, though this technique was usually reserved for those who could afford both brand-new kimono and undergarments of the same design to be commissioned at once.

However, the process of modernisation was still slow, and a more typical representation of Meiji period underclothes found in the Collection is women's under-kimono, made of different pieces of fabric, often with radically different colours and designs; these under-kimono, known as dōnuki, were often made from old kimono that had become unwearable, resulting in a sometimes complex, often symmetrical patchwork of motifs and fabrics, and were a common use for old kimono until the Taisho period, when it was no longer economically viable to make one's own clothing in the face of cheaper ready-to-wear garments. For men, under-kimono often featured highly-decorative and often heavily pictorial scenes that would then be covered entirely by the outer kimono, which was typically very plain or designed with a simple and subtle pattern. Example of men's under-kimono within the collection display depictions of performers, dancers and haiku poems; one piece combines postcard-like scenes of Japan's progress with a textual diary of the Meiji era.

The use of bold colours and intricate designs spurred on by technological advancements can also be seen in the clothing of infants and young children represented in the Collection, including a boy's kimono and under-kimono set decorated with cranes and pine trees, and a girl's set that combines a deep blue outer-kimono with a bright red under-kimono. These colours and designs often utilised materials common to adult fashions.

Examples of Meiji period kimono within the Khalili Collection
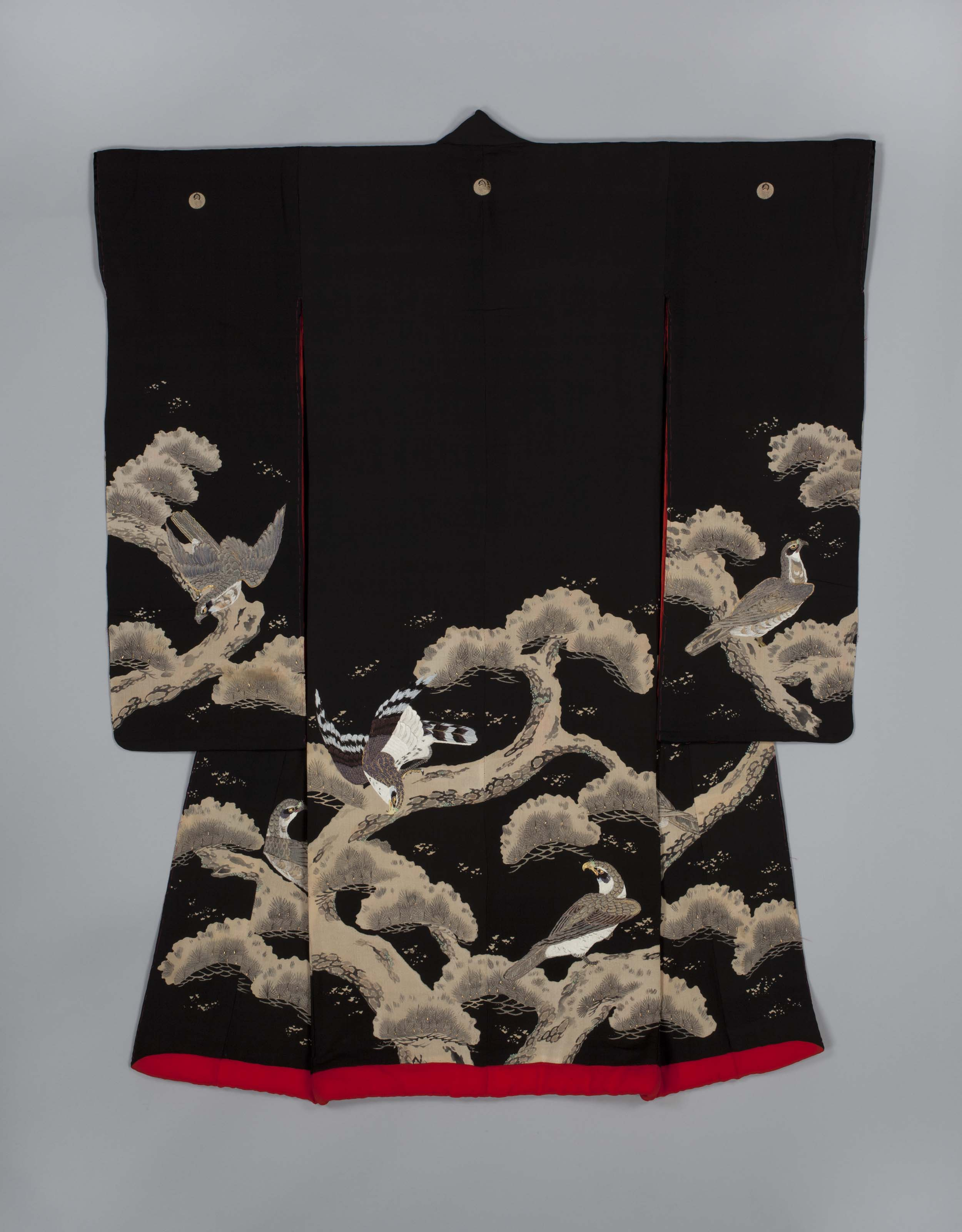
Outer kimono for a high-class young woman (uchikake) depicting hawks in pine trees, 1870-1900

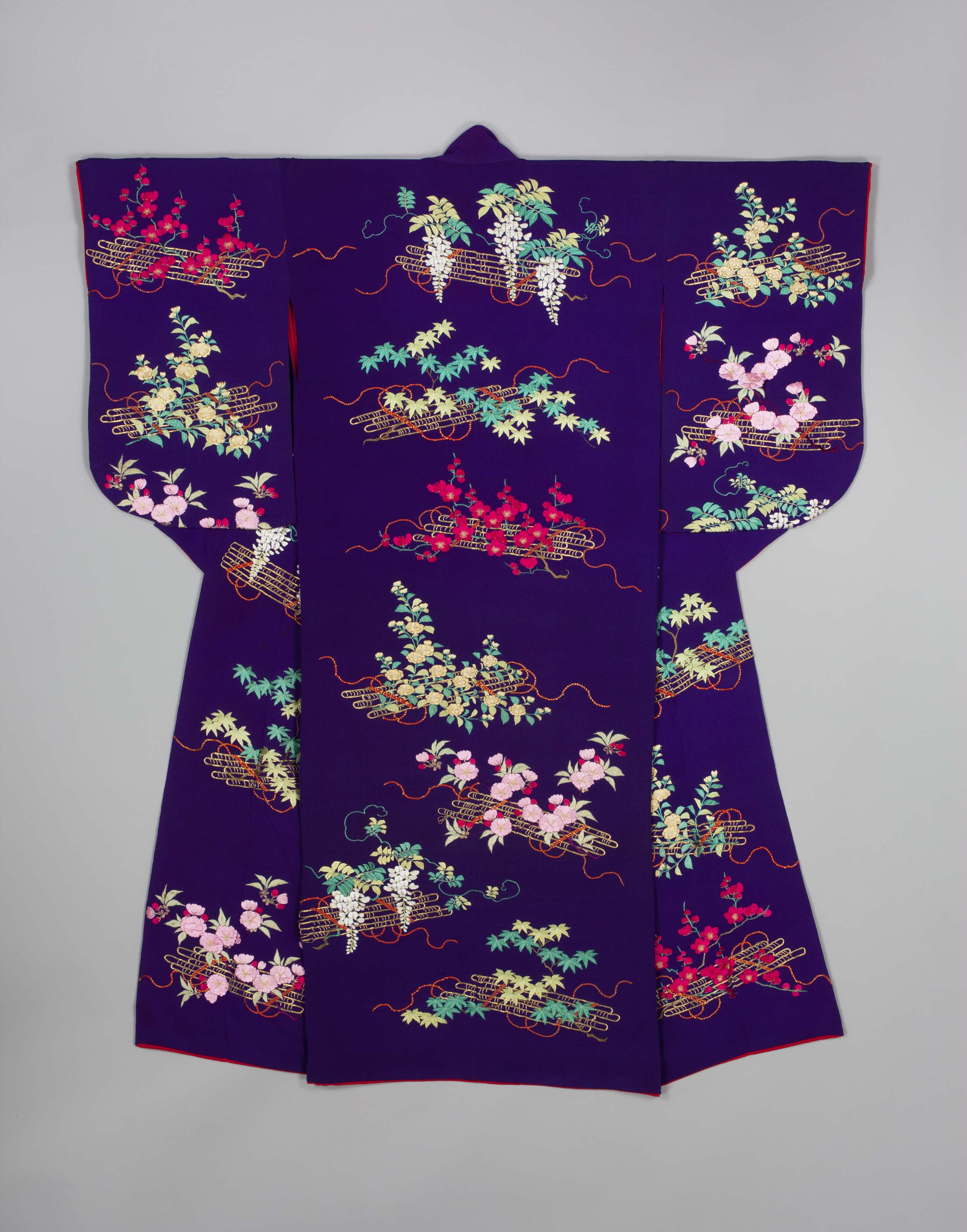
Kimono for a woman (kosode) showing flowers on rafts, 1870-1900

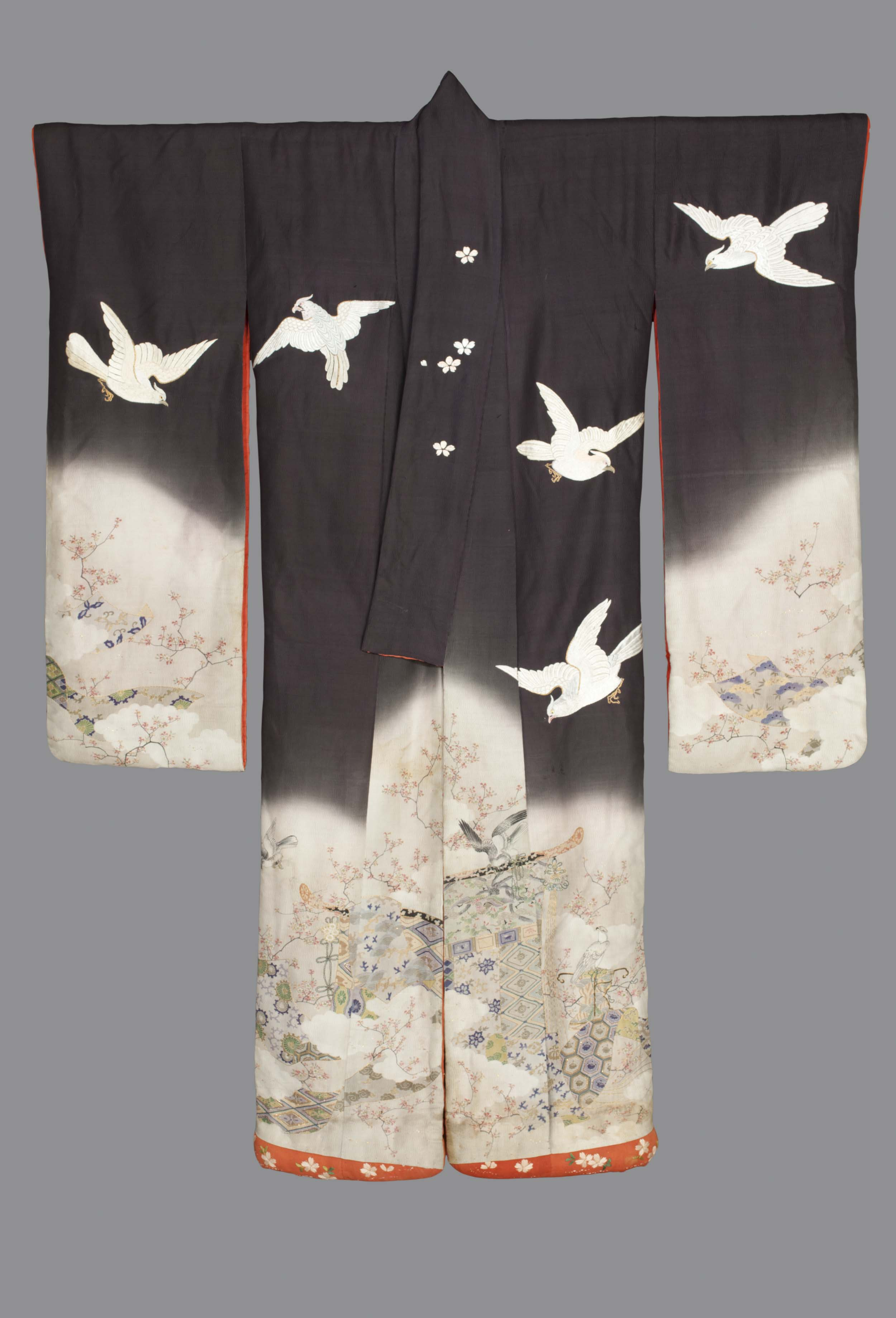
Outer kimono for a high-class young woman (uchikake) depicting hawks, 1880-1900

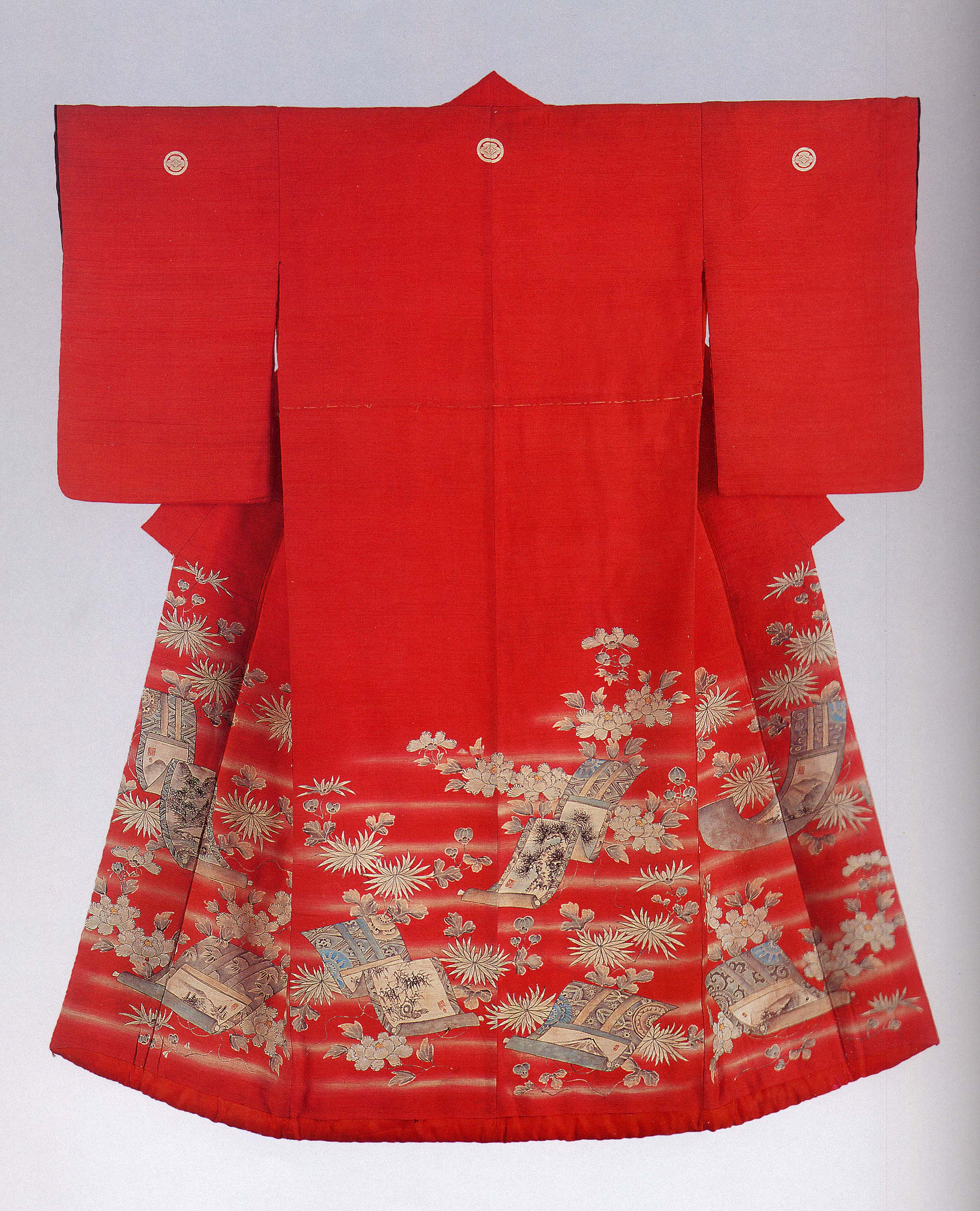
Outer kimono for a high-class young woman (uchikake) with hanging scroll motifs, 1880–1890

== Taishō and early Shōwa periods (1912–1950) ==
The modernisation and development of kimono carried forwards into the early 20th century and the Taishō and early Shōwa periods, bringing with them a mix of new cultural influences, both of Western influence and Japanese nationalism. Kimono of these periods are identifiable by their vibrant colours and highly-varied, often incredibly modern designs. The Collection features items illustrating the overlap between the traditions of previous eras and the introduction of new ideas to contemporary kimono designs, with many featuring traditional motifs depicted in bold, bright colours.

Both Art Nouveau and Art Deco found cultural purchase in kimono designs of the Taishō period, as a style of inexpensive, durable and ready-to-wear silk kimono known as meisen (lit. "common silk stuff") became immensely popular, particularly following the devastating 1923 Great Kantō earthquake, after which ready-to-wear meisen kimono became widely sold following the loss of many people's possessions. Meisen kimono often featured a number of ikat-dyed and woven designs in the Art Deco style, and ranged from basic to incredibly complex in their woven patterns, a number of which are represented in the Collection. One such common example of woven trends of the 1930s, represented in the Collection, is black kimono with abstract woven patterns in red, yellow, cream and white.

Mass-produced garments in new, cheap fibres such as rayon used printing to cheaply imitate traditional dyeing processes; the kimono of young children, particularly during the 1930s and 40s, was often made of rayon, and was commonly printed with mass-produced modern designs, with the imagery on young boy's kimono reflecting this especially heavily through designs of skyscrapers, cars and planes.

The urban culture of the Taishō period (stylised as "Taishō Roman") was marked by "modanizumu" (modernism), which utilised imported Western art movements and fashion as a way to experiment within Japanese culture. In many aspects of Japanese culture, debate raged over traditional aspects of Japanese culture in the face of new Western styles. For many, the new, bold designs on kimono were a comfortable middle ground combining aspects of both. As well as stripes and checks, these new, often geometric patterns also included the use of arabesques and swastikas - in some cases the traditional interlocking swastika motif known as sayagata, but towards the early Shōwa period, the explicitly-Third Reich swastika flag. With the rise of Japanese militarism in the 1930s, many previously-adopted aspects of Western culture were abandoned in the face of a new wave of nationalism. The Collection features a number of military-themed kimono from World War II, depicting tanks, warships and aircraft. Male kimono designs, including that of young boys, adopted explicitly militaristic imagery, including soldiers, bombers and tanks. As was common with men's kimono, the designs were featured on linings and undergarments. The kimono worn by young boys were more often openly militaristic in style. The Collection also has examples of highly-pictographic contemporary kimono, whose decoration celebrates modern forms of transport including ocean liners.

The semi-formal, colourfully-decorated hōmongi style is also represented in the Collection in examples from this time period, as is a formal, black style with decoration limited to below the waist, known as kurotomesode.

Examples of Taishō and early Shōwa period kimono within the Khalili Collection
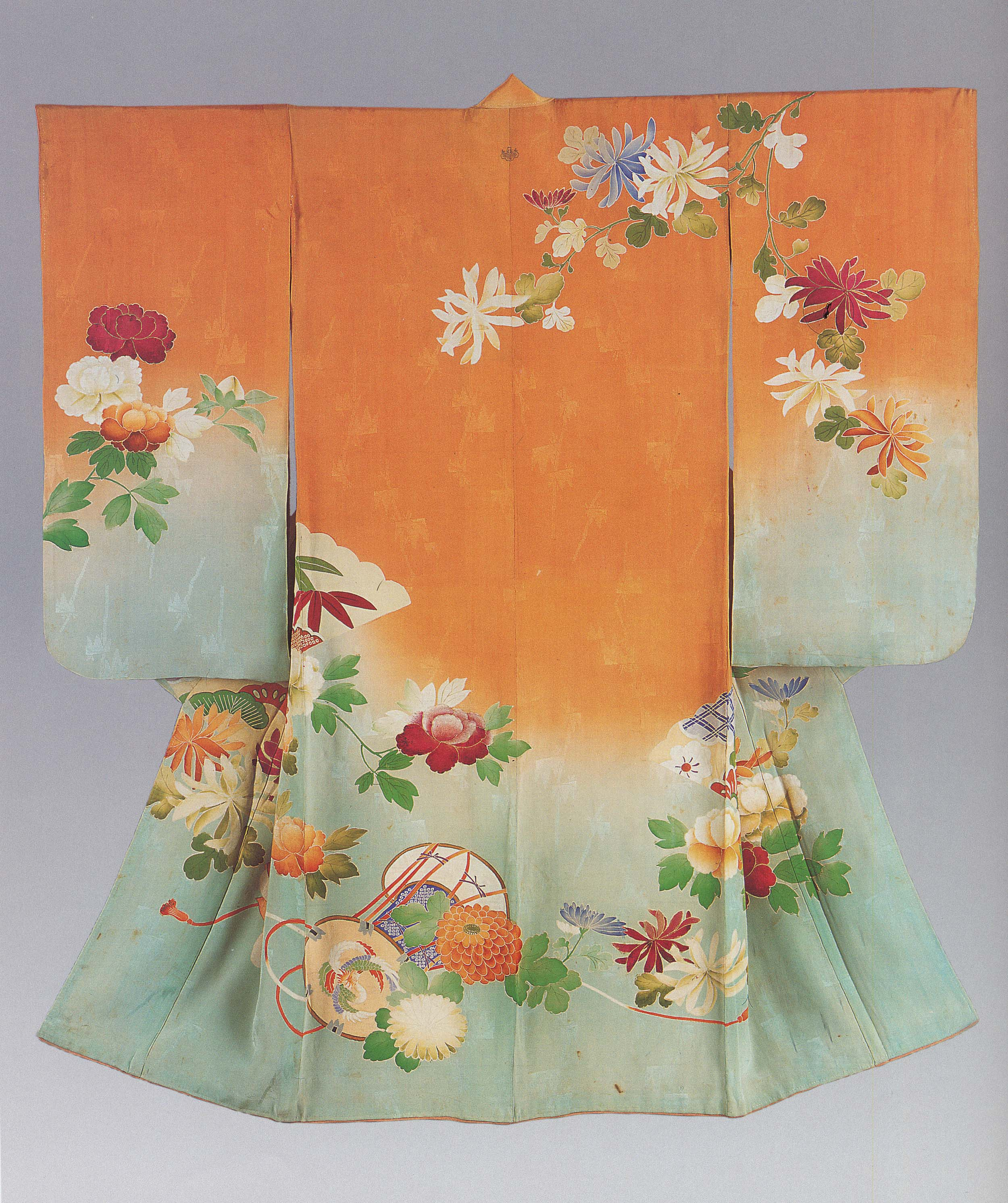
Kimono for a young girl depicting drums and flowers, 1912–1926

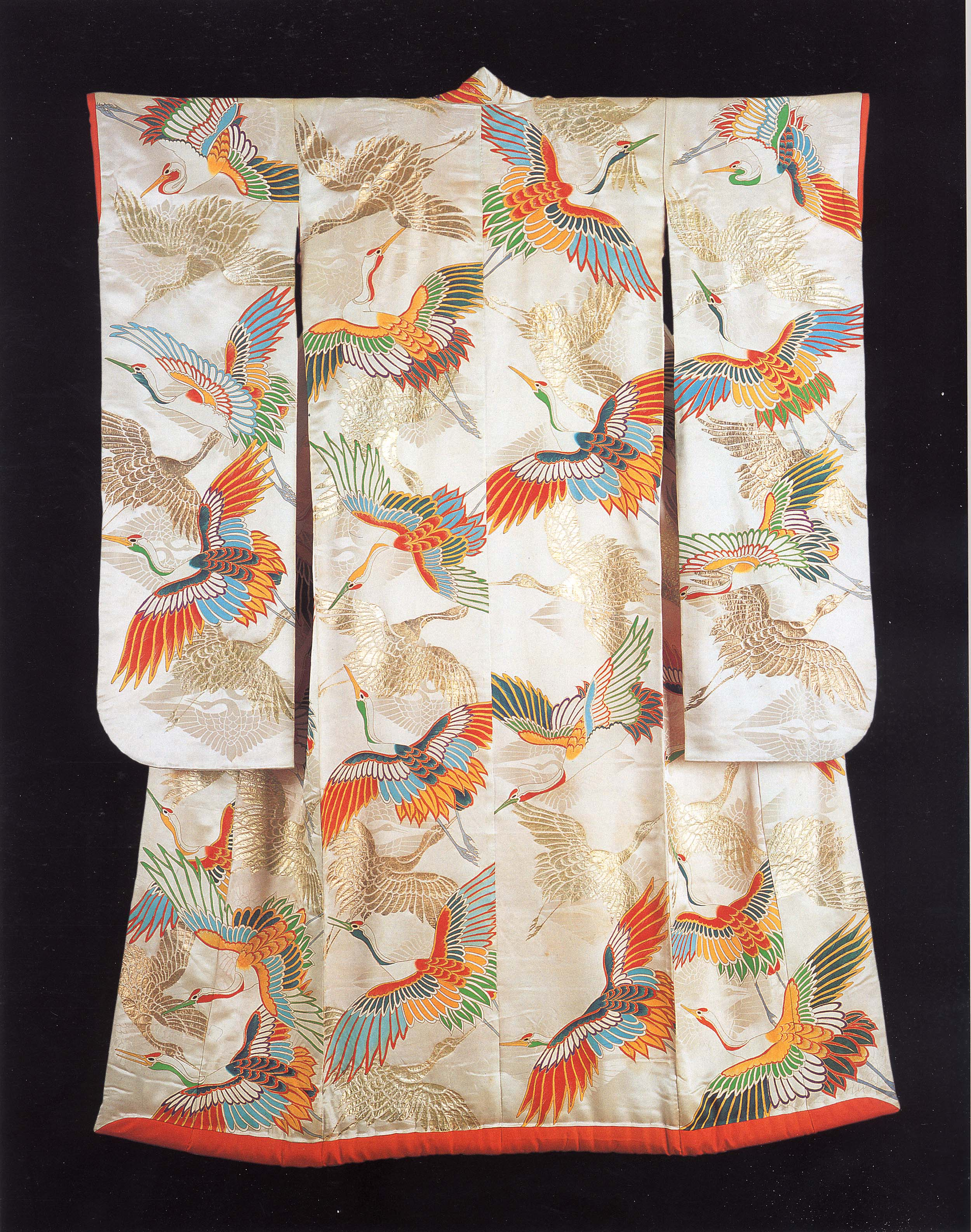
Bridal outer kimono for a high-class young woman (uchikake), 1920–1930. A wedding kimono, this depicts cranes, said to symbolise a long marriage.

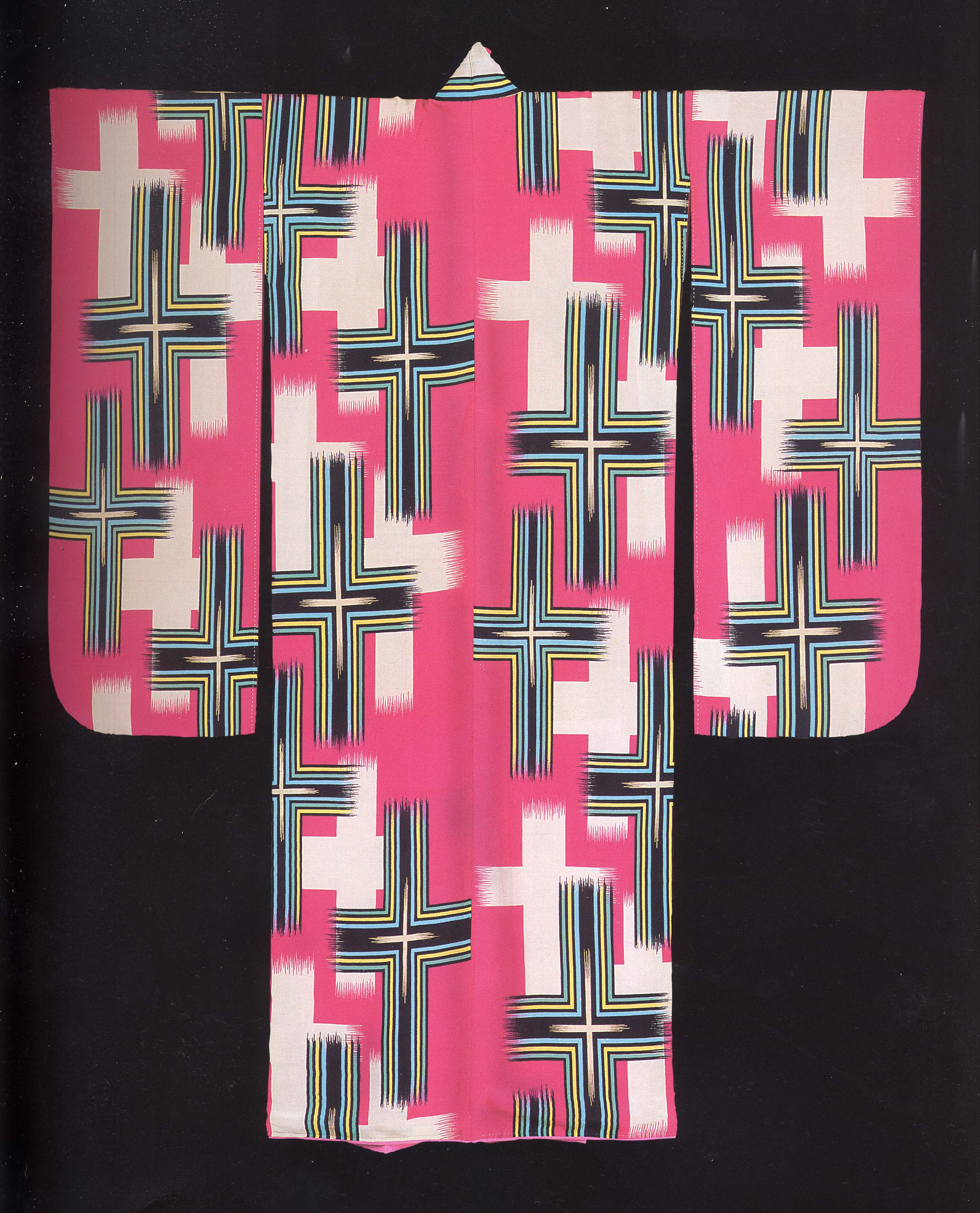
Kimono for a girl (furisode), 1920–1940. An example of patterns created by stencil printing

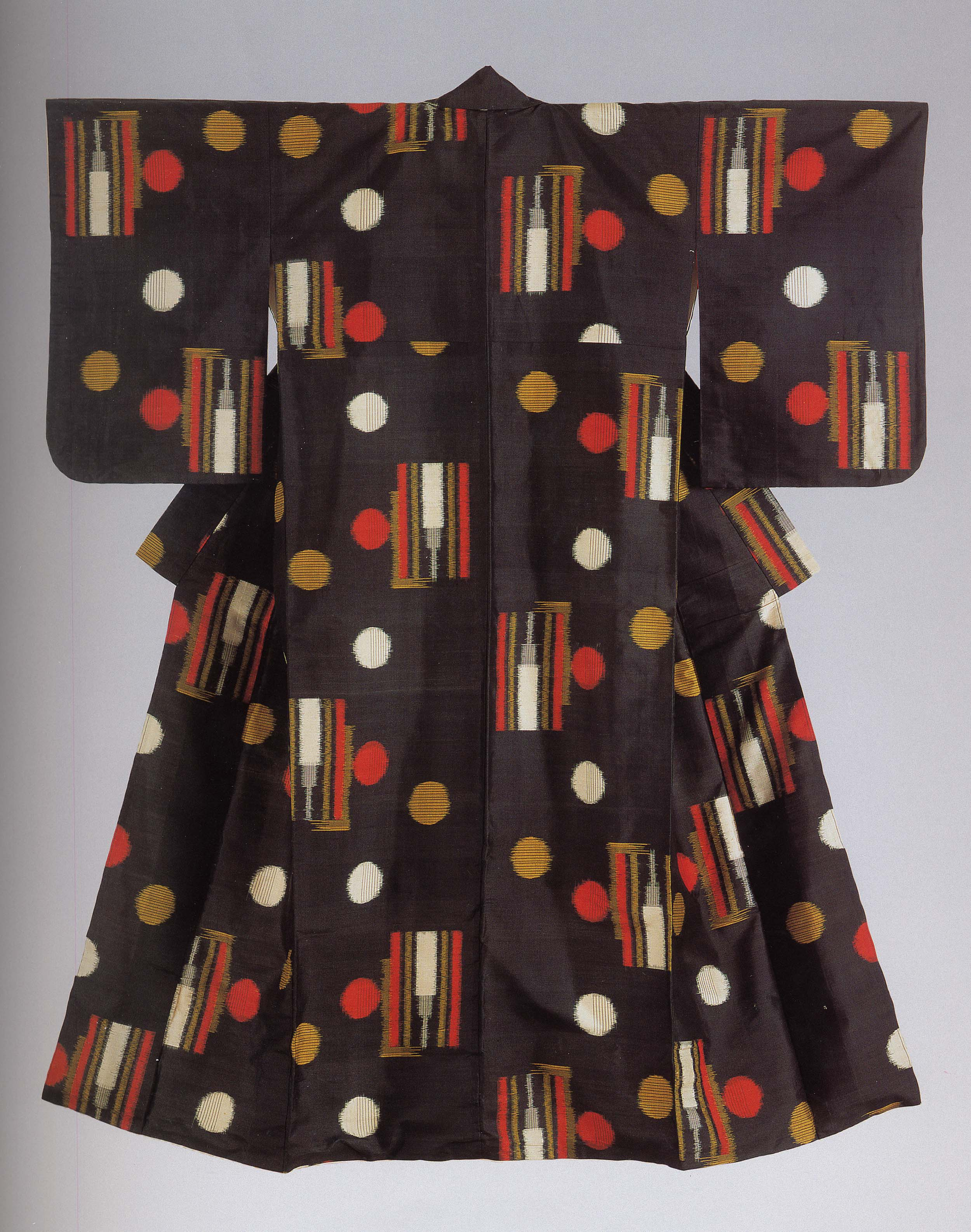
Woman's meisen kimono woven with a skyscraper motif, 1930–1940

== Publications ==
The collection has been the subject of two books. Kimono: The Art and Evolution of Japanese Fashion, edited by Anna Jackson, first published in English in 2015 with French and Italian translations. It describes, with photographs, 220 items from the collection, including essays explaining how the evolution of the kimono reflected political, social and cultural changes in Japan. Jackson is the Keeper of the Asian Department at the Victoria and Albert Museum. Images of Culture: Japanese Kimono 1915–1950 by Jacqui Atkins is scheduled for future publication.

== Exhibitions ==
Items from the collection were included in the 2017 Treasures of Imperial Japan exhibition at the Kremlin Museums and in Kimono: Kyoto to Catwalk at London's Victoria and Albert Museum in 2020, an event cut short by the outbreak of COVID-19 in the United Kingdom.
