= Ishikawa Prefectural Museum of Traditional Arts and Crafts =

Museum in Kanazawa, Ishikawa, Japan

- 石川県立伝統産業工芸館
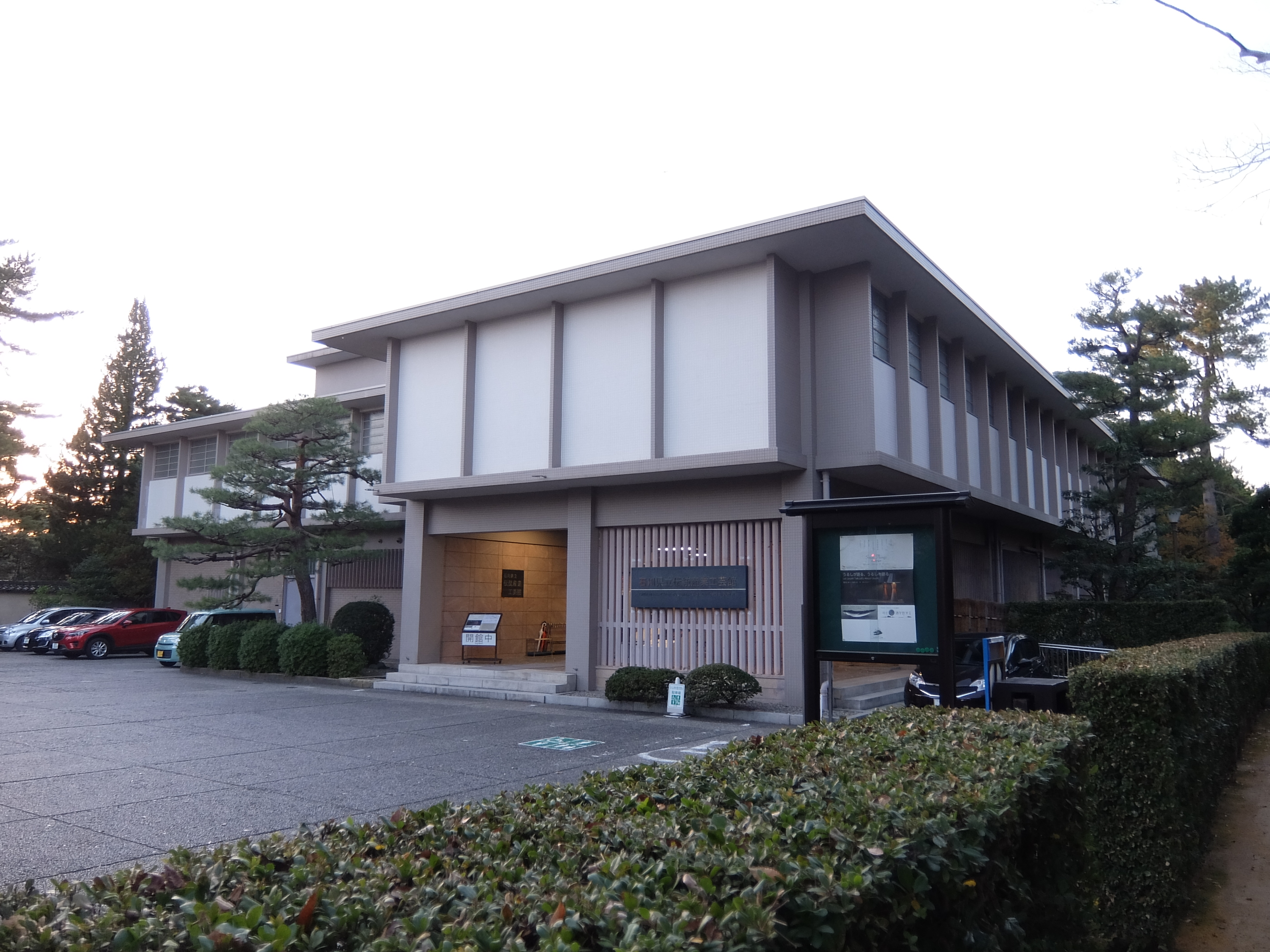
- Established: 1984
- Location: Kanazawa, Ishikawa, Japan
- Coordinates: 36°33′39.8″N 136°39′50.6″E
- Type: museum
- Parking: yes
- Website: Official website

The Ishikawa Prefectural Museum of Traditional Arts and Crafts (Japanese: 石川県立伝統産業工芸館) is a museum about traditional arts and crafts located in Kenroku-en, Kanazawa, Ishikawa Prefecture, Japan.

== History ==
The museum was established in 1984. It was closed on 20 December 2014 until 22 February 2015 due to renovation work and was reopened again on 23 February 2015.

== Architecture ==
The museum is housed in a 2-story building located at the outer perimeter of Kenroku-en Garden. The ground floor houses the special exhibition areas, gift shop, photo space and café. The upper floor houses the permanent exhibition areas, special exhibition areas, display of product processes and seminar room.

== Exhibitions ==
The museum exhibits 36 different types of crafts of Ishikawa Prefecture, which are Kaga Yuzen Silk Dyeing, Ushikubi Pongee, Kaga Embroidery, Noto Linen, Kanazawa Japanese Umbrella, Kaga Paper Stencils, Kutani Porcelain, Wajima Urushi Lacquer Ware, Yamanaka Urushi Lacquer Ware, Kanazawa Urushi Lacquer Ware, Suzu Pottery, Kanazawa Ohi Ware, Kanazawa Tea Ceremony Kettle, Kanazawa Gold Leaf, Ishikawa's Washi Paper, Kanazawa Paulownia Ware, Kaga Cypress Wickerwork, Kaga Inlay, Kanazawa Scroll Mounts, Bamboo Wickerwork, Kaga Tsurugi Edged Steel, Kanazawa Buddhist Altar, Nanao Buddhist Altar, Mikawa Buddhist Altar, Nanao Japanese Candles, Kaga Decorative Fishing Flies Bait, Kaga Fishing Rod, Kanazawa Traditional Local Toys, Kanazawa Koto, Kanazawa Sangen, Kaga Taiko, Kanazawa Bronze Gong, Kaga Lion Dance Mask, Kaga Lantern, Kaga Mizuhiki and Noto Fireworks. The crafts are displayed in a dim-lighted ambient with description available in English. It is divided into permanent exhibition areas and special exhibition areas. The permanent exhibition areas is divided into clothes, festivals, foods, houses and prayers sections.

== Facilities ==
The museum features a shop selling various kinds of traditional crafts made by local artists from Ishikawa Prefecture and a café.

== Transportation ==
The museum is accessible by bus departing from Kanazawa Station of West Japan Railway Company.

== See also ==
- List of museums in Japan
