= Ferragamo (surname) =

Ferragamo is an Italian surname from Campania, originally indicating a farrier, blacksmith or other profession involving iron (Italian: ferro). Notable people with the surname include:

- Antonio Ferragamo, Italian-Spanish astrophysicist
- Fiamma Ferragamo (1941–1998), Italian shoe designer and businesswoman, daughter of Salvatore
- James Ferragamo (born 1971), Italian businessman, grandson of Salvatore
- John Ferragamo, American murder witness and accomplice
- Salvatore Ferragamo (1898–1960), Italian shoe designer and businessman, the founder of the eponymous luxury brand
- Vince Ferragamo (born 1954), American football player
- Wanda Ferragamo (née Miletti; 1921–2018), Italian fashion designer and businesswoman, wife of Salvatore
