= James Ferragamo =

Italian businessman

- Born: 7 November 1971 (age 54); Florence, Italy
- Education: New York University
- Occupation: Businessman
- Known for: Women's and Men's Shoes and Leather goods Division Director of Ferragamo
- Parent(s): Ferruccio Ferragamo; Amanda Peat
- Relatives: Salvatore Ferragamo (grandfather); Wanda Miletti (grandmother); Fiamma Ferragamo (aunt)

James Ferragamo (born November 7, 1971) is an Italian businessman. He is the Men's and Women's Leather Product Director for Ferragamo.

== Early life and education ==
He was born on November 7, 1971, in Florence. He is the son of Ferruccio Ferragamo, Chairman of Salvatore Ferragamo S.p.A., and grandson of Salvatore Ferragamo, founder of the eponymous shoe brand.

He grew up in the Chianti estate of Il Borro, which his father had purchased in 1993. At a young age, he was interested in joining the family business: "When I was 10, I went to the factory and made a pair of shoes for my grandmother. They were a pair of Vara flats in black patent leather with a gold bow. I ruined three pairs before I actually got it right. My grandmother never wore them and put them on the mantelpiece to show off instead."

While studying for his undergraduate and master's degrees at New York University, he spent holidays as a sales assistant in Los Angeles at the Ferragamo boutique. He is a graduate of New York University Stern School of Business.

== Career ==
He began working with the family company in 1998, after working at Saks Fifth Avenue and Goldman Sachs in London. At the time, the Ferragamo family had a rule that only three family members could work in the business at one time, making it "very competitive."

In 2001, he was merchandising manager for Salvatore Ferragamo Italia SpA, which was operating 55 stand-alone stores in Japan, nine in Italy, and 10 in France.

By 2013, he was director of women's leather goods, and was overseeing a line by Vara. Ferragamo was director of women's leather goods in 2013.

Prior to 2015, he worked on the launch of the "Audrey shoe, the Vara and Varina Made to Order," and also bags the Sofia, the Verve, and the Fiamma, and by 2015 had been named Director of Women's and Men's Shoes and Leather Goods Division. In 2016, he ran the show and leather goods division. In 2017, he continued to lead the "Men's and Women's Footwear and Leatherworking" division.

In October 2018, he was director of men's and women's shoes and the leather division.

Dubbed Giacomo "James" Ferragamo by Fashion Weekly in March 2021, that month he replaced Paul Andrew on the company board.

By March 2021, there were 10 Ferragamo family members on the company board, including James, who was also brand and product and communication director.

He joined after resigning from the board the year before, "allowing [Michele Norsa] to be recruited and assume the executive powers previously exercised by his father." After resigning from the board, he had kept his role as brand and product and communication director.

== Personal life ==
He and his family spend some time at the Ferragamo estate in Chianti, which is also a restored medieval village that has a Relais & Châteaux hotel and villas.

In 2017, he was active training for triathlon, dedicating 3 hours in mornings to the sport.

== See also ==
- Salvatore Ferragamo: James' grandfather, the founder of Salvatore Ferragamo S.p.A.
