= Fiamma Ferragamo =

Italian shoe designer and businesswoman

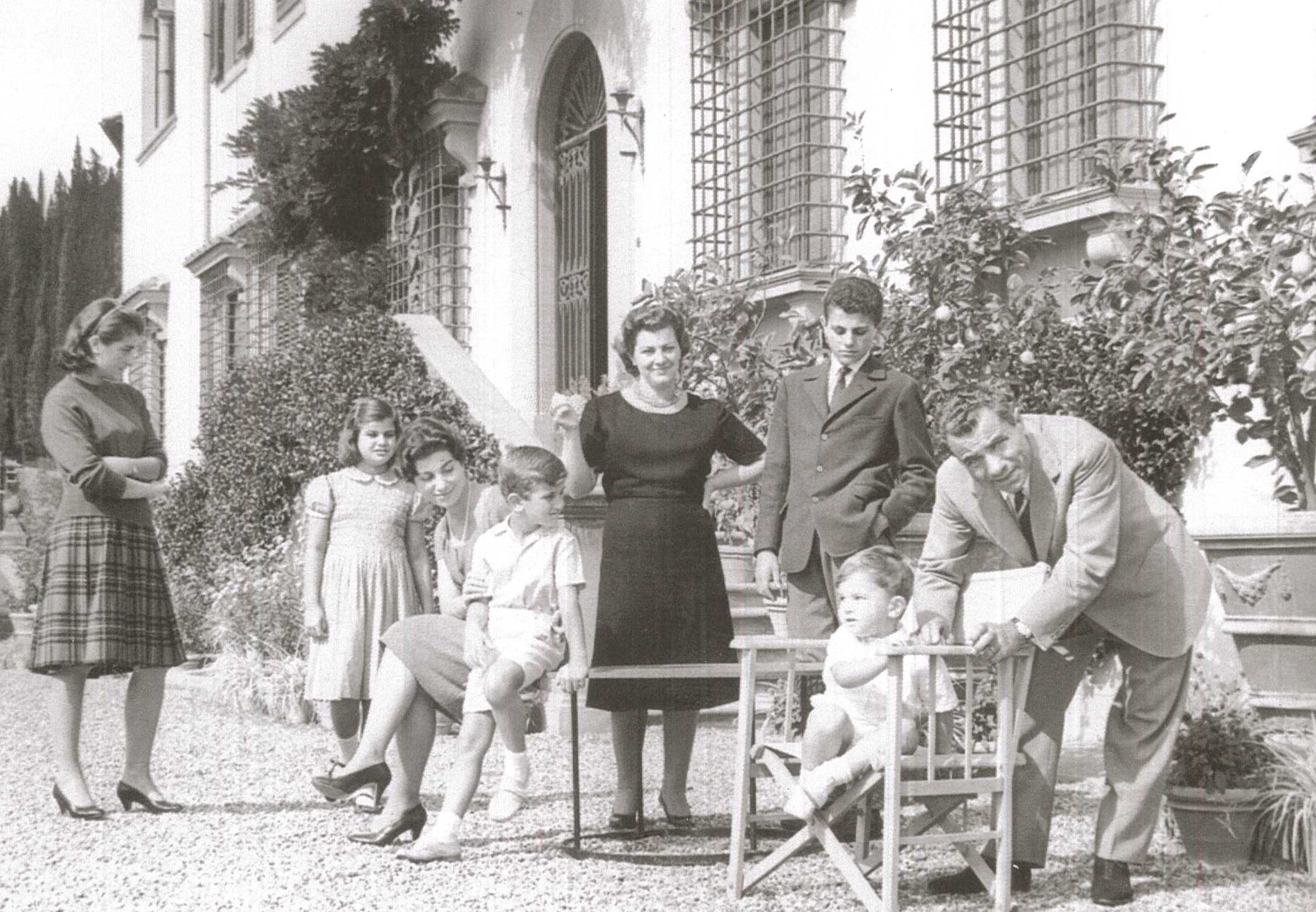
- Born: Fiamma Ferragamo; September 3, 1941; Florence, Kingdom of Italy
- Died: 28 September 1998 (aged 57); Florence, Italy
- Occupations: Businessperson; Shoe designer
- Years active: 1957–1998
- Spouse: Marchese Giuseppe di San Giuliano (m. 1969)
- Children: 3
- Parents: Salvatore Ferragamo (father); Wanda Miletti (mother)
- Relatives: James Ferragamo (nephew)

Fiamma Ferragamo (3 September 1941 – 28 September 1998) was an Italian businessperson and shoe designer who was executive vice president of the company Salvatore Ferragamo S.p.A. She began working for the company under her father Salvatore Ferragamo when she was 16 and inherited it following his death in 1960. Ferragamo expanded the business' operations and designed the Vara shoe in the 1960s. She received the 1967 Neiman Marcus Award for Distinguished Service in Fashion among other awards.

== Family background ==
She was born Fiamma Ferragamo in Florence, Italy in 1941, during the height of the Second World War. She was the eldest of six children of the shoe designer Salvatore Ferragamo and his wife Wanda Ferragamo (née Miletti). She had ancestors hailing from Naples. The family survived the War despite an attempted occupation of their residence in Fiesole by the Nazis and the subsequent sustained bombing by the Allied forces.

== Career ==
At age 16, Ferragamo left school to join her father's business Salvatore Ferragamo S.p.A. to learn his trade and was the only one of his children to do so. She was more impressed at his shoe making ability rather than meeting his celebrity clientele, and inherited the business at age 19 when her father died suddenly of cancer in 1960. Ferragamo told The Philadelphia Inquirer in 1993 that she "was very much afraid" but had received assistance from members of her family. She was made executive vice-president of Salvatore Ferragamo S.p.A. and board member of the company. The following year, she had taken control of the design of the company's handbags, luggage, shoes and small leather wear, and had launched her first official footwear design in London. The show received critical acclaim and increased Ferragamo's profile. According to Stasia Evasuk the Ottawa Journal, she designed between 500 and 600 pairs of shoes per year by 1967 and had private clients such as Carroll Baker, Ginger Rogers and the Duchess of Windsor. Ferragamo began designing handbags in 1968 and increased the company's shoe designs to around 800 to 1,000 by 1972.

She was the creator of the Vara shoe that has a round toe and small heel in the 1960s. Ferragamo won the 1967 Neiman Marcus Award for Distinguished Service in Fashion, the most prestigious award in the fashion industry world. The citation of her award was "her own original design concepts and brought a new dimension to the name of Ferragamo". Two years later, she received the Saks Fifth Avenue Award; the American Footwear News Designer of the Year in 1988 and in February 1993, the Fashion Footwear Association of New York Medal of Honor. She oversaw the acquisition of the Paris fashion firm Emanuel Ungaro in 1996 since her company had grown to be more robust. Ferragamo saw the business acquire interests in hotels, and designed shoes for the films Evita and Ever After with each of their costume designers. Away from her business, she was on the board of the Italian Environmental Fund that is tasks with protecting historic Italian houses. She was also a member of the Bank of Italy's Consiglio di Regganza and served on the council of the Centro di Firenze per la Mode Italiana.

== Personal life ==
Evasuk described her as "a quiet, modest hardworking woman." In 1969, Ferragamo married Marchese Giuseppe di San Giuliano. They had three children (two daughters and a son). Ferragamo was diagnosed with breast cancer in 1989; she continued to work through her illness for several years even though doctors thought she would only live for a few more months. She died at her home in Florence on the night of 28 September 1998. A service was held for Ferragamo at Florence's San Spirito Church on 30 September. She received a burial service at the Brunelleschi church of Santo Spirito the following day.

== Legacy ==
According to The Times, she turned Salvatore Ferragammo S.p.A " from the famous but still small shoemaking workshop of her father's day into one of the leading names in the Italian luxury goods market, earning millions of dollars in exports in America and around the world".
