= Riccardo Tisci =

Italian fashion designer (born 1974)

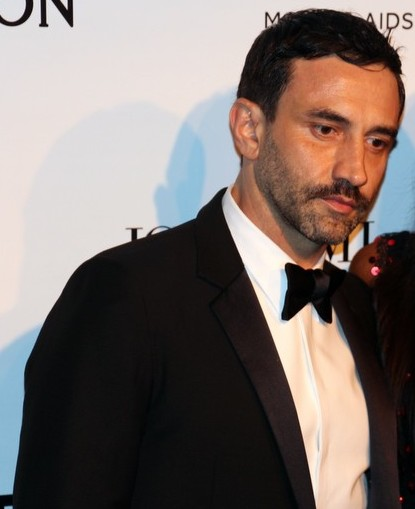
- Riccardo Tisci in 2010
- Born: 1 August 1974 (age 52); Taranto, Apulia, Italy
- Education: Central Saint Martins
- Occupation: Fashion designer
- Years active: 1999 – present
- Labels: Givenchy; Burberry

Riccardo Tisci (Italian pronunciation: [rikˈkardo ˈtiʃʃi]; born 1974) is an Italian fashion designer.

== Early life and education ==
Tisci was born in Taranto and raised in Como. He studied in Italy at the Design Istituto d'Arte Applicata in Cantù until the age of 17, and then graduated from London's Central Saint Martins College of Art and Design in 1999.

== Career ==
=== Early beginnings ===
Upon graduation, Tisci worked for companies including Puma, Antonio Berardi and Coccapani before signing a three-year contract with Ruffo Research, a company that has helped launch the careers of several fashion designers, including Sophia Kokosalaki.

Upon the expiration of his contract in July 2004, Tisci spent time living in India, where he began to work on his own collection. In September 2004, during Milan Fashion Week in Milan, Tisci debuted his first Riccardo Tisci Collection for Fall 2005/2006 in an off-calendar show.

=== Givenchy, 2005–2017 ===
In February 2005, Tisci was appointed as the creative director of the haute couture, ready-to-wear and accessories lines for Givenchy. Brought to Givenchy by LVMH chief operating officer Antonio Belloni and Givenchy chief executive officer Marco Gobbetti, Gobbetti called Tisci a "perfect fit for us... He [Tisci] has an elegance that is very modern, very contemporary and romantic at the same time".

Tisci presented his first Givenchy haute-couture collection in July 2005 during Paris Fashion Week in Paris.

Tisci, under Givenchy, designed the costumes for singer Madonna's Sticky & Sweet Tour in 2008, following Jean Paul Gaultier and Dolce & Gabbana. In 2009, for the encore of the tour he designed another costume for the tour's opening song "Candy Shop".

In February 2017, Tisci stepped down as creative director of Givenchy, saying: "I now wish to focus on my personal interests and passions." Givenchy's turnover had increased six-fold during Tisci's twelve-year tenure.

=== Burberry, 2018–2022 ===
In 2018, Tisci was named by Burberry to replace Christopher Bailey as the brand's chief creative officer. This was followed by a limited-time collaboration with Vivienne Westwood for the Winter 2018 collection.

Tisci's vision while at Burberry was to create pieces that walk the line between tradition and modernity with a darkly gothic charm.

His tenure lasted through to September 2022, when it was announced that Tisci would be replaced by English designer Daniel Lee.

== Style ==
Unlike the designers before him who succeeded Hubert Givenchy himself, Tisci has had particular success in haute couture, where he has asserted: "When I arrived we had five customers. Now we have 29". Tisci's runway presentations are highly stylized in terms of architecture and space. Tisci says of this: "My way of showing is very melancholic... I love romanticism and sensuality".

For the Givenchy Fall–Winter 2010 collection, he included a new model, Lea T, a transgender woman from Brazil, his longtime personal assistant.

== Collaborations ==
Throughout his career, Tisci's numerous connections and relationships have enabled him to collaborate with well-known artists on various projects:

- 2008 – invited to curate the issue 8 of A-Anna magazine
- 2010 – celebrated the end of the exhibit The artist is present at a dinner for Marina Abramović; afterwards, she was chosen to appear in a campaign for Spring–Summer 2013 of Givenchy
- 2011 – guest-edited Visionaire's RELIGION issue
- 2011 – collaborated with the perfumer Francois Demachy to make the perfume Le Dahlia Noir
- 2011 –designed the cover of the collaborative album Watch the Throne by Jay-Z and Kanye West
- 2011 – curated issue #8 of A Magazine, in which he featured artwork by Ray Caesar as a source of his creative inspiration
- 2013 – dressed the singer Rihanna for her Diamonds World Tour
- 2014 – collaborated with Beyoncé and Jay-Z for the On the Run Tour
- 2014 – collaborated with Nike to create a series of Air Force 1 shoes
- 2016 – launched a thirty-piece sportswear collaboration with Nike called NikeLab x RT: Training Redefined, aimed at Olympic athletes for the 2016 Summer Olympics as everyday gym users
- 2016 – collaborated with virtual pop idol Hatsune Miku for an article in Vogue magazine in the lead up to the 2016 Met Gala
- 2018 – collaborated with NikeLab again, creating a fictional basketball team's apparel and footwear

In addition to his position at Givenchy, Tisci has collaborated with the choreographers Sidi Larbi Cherkaoui and Damien Jalet on the costume design of the orchestral ballet Boléro by Maurice Ravel at the Opéra Garnier in Paris.

Italian model Mariacarla Boscono often appears in his runway shows and ad campaigns, owing possibly to the fact that Tisci has had a friendship with her since before his days at Givenchy.

Tisci also collaborated with American rappers Jay-Z and Kanye West to create the cover for Watch the Throne 2011 album, as well as the covers for singles "H•A•M" and "Otis". He collaborated again with West for his label GOOD Music on the 2012 album Cruel Summer.

Tisci is a mentor to designer Luis De Javier, who has worked as his stylist.

== Personal life ==
Tisci is openly gay.

== Lawsuits ==
In 2025, Tisci was sued in the New York Supreme Court by Patrick Cooper on charges of alleged sexual assault and sexual abuse involving the administration of drugs, as well as false imprisonment and violation of the New York State Gender-Motivated Violence Act, in relation to events that took place in New York on 29 June 2024. In the documents filed with the District Court for the Southern District of New York, Italian singer Mahmood was summoned to appear at the trial as he was present at the time of the events and as an accomplice in the delivery of a drink allegedly laced with drugs to Cooper. On 20 May 2026, the prosecution revealed in a document filed with the Court that the full private conversations via text and voice messaging exchanged between Tisci and Mahmood had not been handed over in their entirety by the defence.
