= Ray Caesar =

Ray Caesar (born October 26, 1958) is an English surreal artist who lives and works in Arcadia, Canada.

== Early life ==
Ray spent 17 years working in the Art & Photography Department of the Hospital For Sick Children in Toronto, in their art therapy program. Inspired by surrealists such as Frida Kahlo and Salvador Dalí, Caesar's experiences at the Children's Hospital deeply influenced his artwork. Caesar said: "Working in a photography department in a Children's hospital is chronicling everything from child abuse and reconstructive surgery to the heroic children that deal with life's hardship and challenges. I spent many years creating medical and research documentation, medical and technical drawings, images of huge equipment surrounding tiny premature infants, and visual tools for brain-damaged children".

From 1998 to 2001, he worked as a senior animator in GVFX, Toronto, where he mastered his skills in using 3D modeling software.

== Artistic style ==
Ray Caesar's work is digitally created using 3D modeling software called Maya, mastered while working in digital animation for television and film industries from 1998-2001. His portraits involve contrasting elements of childlike innocence, grotesque physical deformities, and sexual innuendos. In his creations, he merges elements of decorative styles and architectural ages, mixing Art Decò, Victorian styles, and visual codes from the early 1900s.

According to an interview with Empty Lighthouse, Caesar begins his process with "automatic drawing, which is basically just letting your hand do first what your mind hasn't thought about." His work often contains invisible elements in the final render, such as "old letters and photographs in lockets [that are tucked] away into drawers that are closed." Caesar said, "I know they are there... and I love that sometimes I forget they are there." Caesar likens the virtual environment to "a dissociative fugue or deep daydream... you can get lost in there very easily."

== Professional credits ==
In 1999, Caesar received a Primetime Emmy Nomination for Outstanding Special Visual Effects for his work on Total Recall 2070, a Gemini Nomination for Special Effects and a Monitor Award for Special Effects in a series.

== Cultural impact ==
Caesar's work has become popular amongst celebrities and fashion icons, such as Madonna, who collects his works and has claimed Ray Caesar is one of her favorite artists.

Riccardo Tisci of Givenchy curated issue #8 of A Magazine, in which he featured artwork by Ray Caesar as a source of creative inspiration.

Ray Caesar is frequently featured in Contemporary Art magazine Hi Fructose.

== Solo exhibitions ==
- 2015 - "Pretty Little Predators", Gallery House, Toronto, Canada
- 2014 - "The Trouble With Angels", Palazzo Saluzzo Paesana, Turin, Italy
- 2014 - "The Trouble With Angels", Dorothy Circus Gallery, Rome, Italy
- 2013 - "Ray Caesar", Corey Helford Gallery Retrospective Show, Culver City, LA, USA
- 2012 - "Ray Caesar", Kochxbos Gallery, Amsterdam The Netherlands
- 2011 - "A Gentle Kind Of Cruelty", Jonathan LeVine Gallery, New York, USA
- 2011 - "Solo show", Corey Helford Gallery, LA California, USA
- 2010 - "I Sogni Di Cristallo", Mondo Bizzaro Gallery, Rome, Italy
- 2007 - "Ipso Facto", Richard Goodall Gallery, Manchester, England
- 2006 - "Sweet Victory", Jonathan LeVine Gallery, New York, USA
- 2005 - "Secret Doors and Hidden Rooms", Jonathan LeVine Gallery, New York, USA

== Bibliography ==
- Ray Caesar, Art Collection, Volume 1. Mark Murphy Designs, 2008.
- Ray Caesar, Ipso Facto. Richard Goodall Gallery Exclusive, 2007.

== Personal life ==
Caesar was born in England and moved to Canada in 1967 with his family. In interviews, Caesar has revealed that he has dissociative identity disorder, potentially due to witnessing traumatic events in his childhood including abuse, surgical reconstruction, and animal research. He often refers to an "alternate" named Harry, who has been present in his life as an alter ego since he was 10. According to an interview with The Globe and Mail, Harry often appears in Caesar's art as a girl and is a reflection of his gender variance.

Caesar and his wife Jane live in Toronto, Canada.
