= Christopher Bailey (fashion designer) =

British fashion designer

Christopher Bailey CBE
- Born: 11 May 1971 (age 55); Halifax, West Yorkshire, England
- Education: Royal College of Art; University of Westminster
- Occupation: Fashion designer
- Title: Former chief creative officer and president, Burberry Group
- Spouse: Simon Woods (m. 2012)
- Children: 2
- Awards: Designer of the Year, British Fashion Awards 2005

Christopher Paul Bailey CBE (born 11 May 1971) is a British fashion designer who was president and chief creative officer of Burberry. In May 2014, he took up the role of chief creative officer and president, following the departure of former CEO Angela Ahrendts. In February 2018, he was succeeded as chief creative officer by Riccardo Tisci.

== Early life and education ==
Christopher Paul Bailey was born in Yorkshire, England, the son of a carpenter and a window dresser for Marks and Spencer. He graduated from the Royal College of Art with a master's degree in 1994, where he was later awarded an honorary fellowship in 2004 and, in 2013, an honorary-doctorate degree.

== Career ==
From 1994 to 1996, he was the womenswear designer at Donna Karan and senior designer of womenswear at Gucci in Milan from 1996 to 2001. He joined Burberry in May 2001 as design director and became creative director in 2004, and chief creative officer in November 2009.

In 2008, Bailey, alongside Angela Ahrendts, established the Burberry Foundation, dedicated to helping young people realise their dreams and potential through the power of their creativity. The Burberry Foundation invests in select charities focused on supporting young people in the key cities in regions where the majority of Burberry employees live and work, and where they are able to participate in volunteer roles.

On 15 October 2013, Bailey was named as the next CEO of Burberry following Angela Ahrendts's departure to Apple in mid-2014. Bailey took up the role of chief creative officer and CEO on 1 May 2014.

Bailey is credited with transforming the fortunes of the company, turning it into the luxury industry's digital leader and overseeing a reinvigoration of the company's design. Bailey masterminded the design of Burberry's largest store, 121 Regent Street in London, opened in 2012, a bricks-and-mortar incarnation of the brand's website. He also oversaw the design and development of the 160,000-square-foot (15,000 m^{2}) Burberry Global Headquarters at Horseferry House in London, opened in 2009.

In July 2016, it was announced that Marco Gobbetti, CEO of Céline, would be the next CEO of Burberry. Gobbetti took over from Bailey in November 2017, who then transitioned to the role of president while also retaining the title of chief creative officer. In July 2017, Gobbetti replaced Bailey as CEO. Bailey resigned from the board in March 2018 and departed entirely from Burberry the following December.

== Personal life ==
While in Milan, Bailey met and began dating Geert Cloet, brand designer for Miu Miu. He split his time between his home in Milan and England. When Cloet was diagnosed with brain cancer in 2004, he and Bailey moved to Yorkshire to be near Bailey's family. Cloet died the next year.

Bailey has been in a relationship with British actor Simon Woods since 2009, and they married in 2012. They have two daughters, Iris and Nell.

In May 2014 Bailey became the first openly gay executive among FTSE 100 corporations.

== Gallery ==
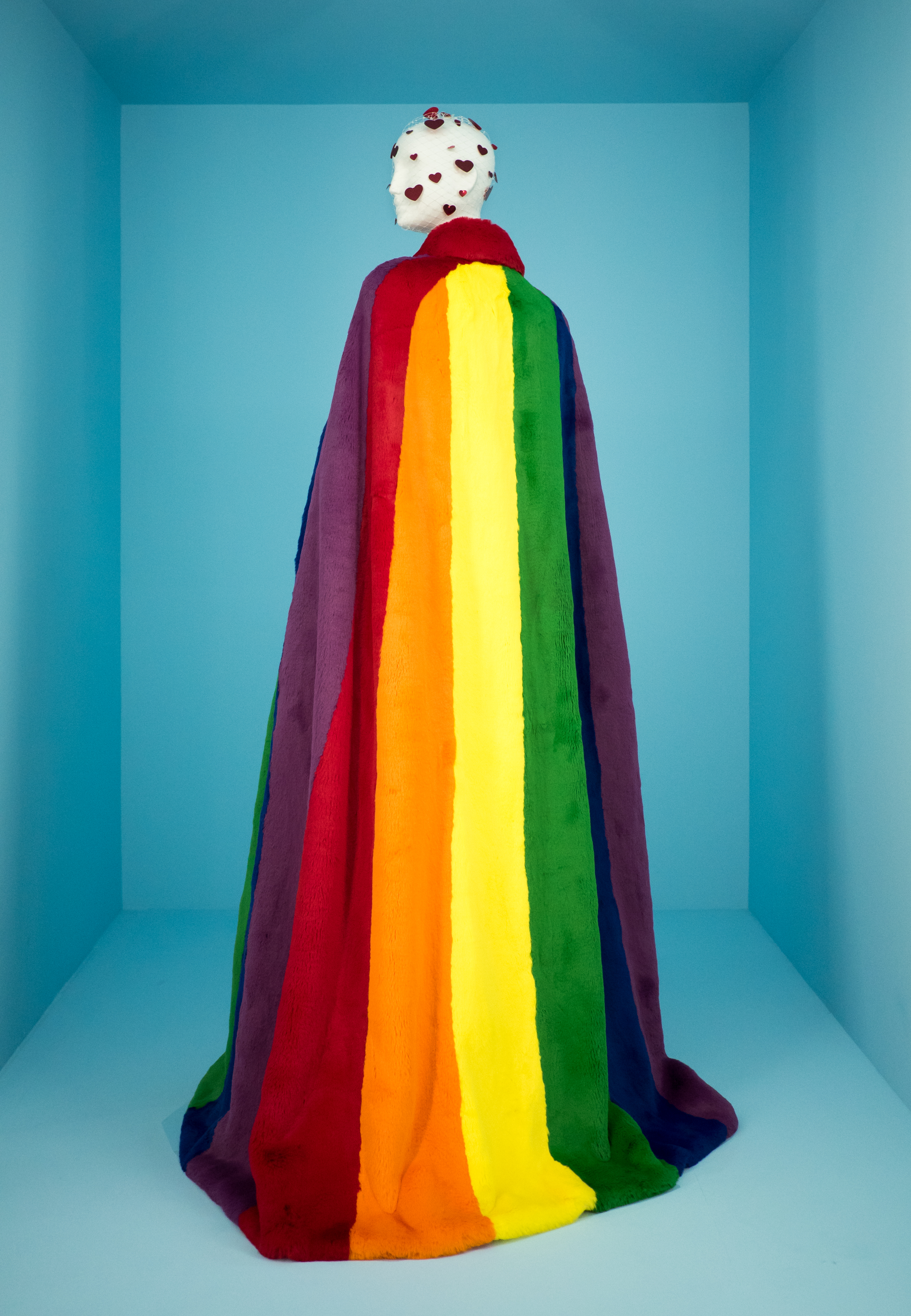
Rainbow cape by Bailey for Burberry on display at The Met's exhibit

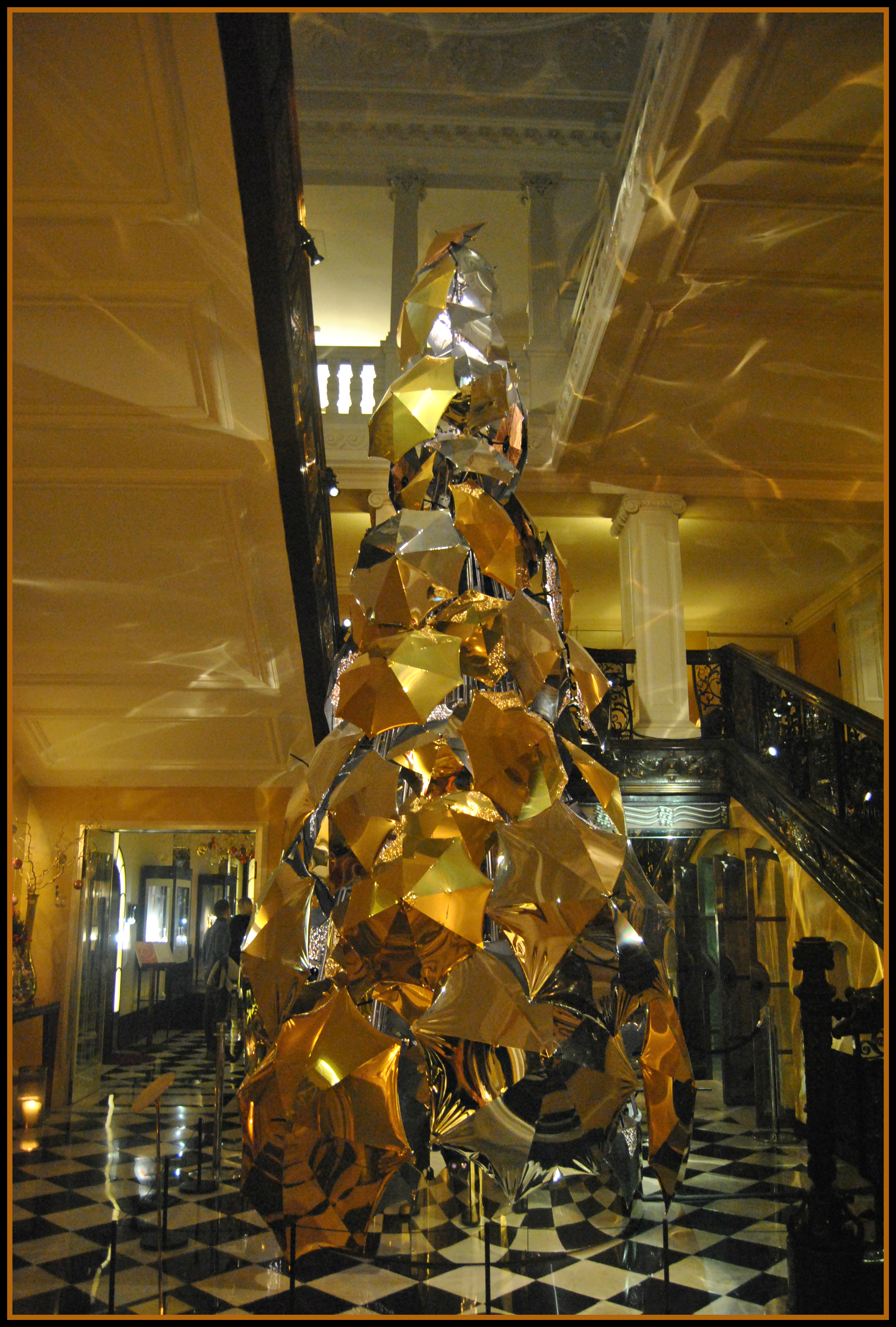
Christmas tree by Bailey for Claridge's, with over 100 umbrellas covered in gold and silver metallic fabric

== Awards ==
- 2004 – Honorary fellowship, the Royal College of Art where Bailey graduated from with a master of arts degree in 1994
- 2005 – Designer of the Year, British Fashion Awards (UK)
- 2006 – Honorary-doctorate degree, the University of Westminster, where Bailey graduated from with a BA in 1990
- 2007 – Menswear Designer of the Year 2007, British Fashion Awards (UK)
- 2007 – Honorary degree, doctorate of science from the University of Huddersfield, Yorkshire
- 2008 – Menswear Designer of the Year 2008, British Fashion Awards (UK)
- 2009 – Designer of the Year, British Fashion Awards (UK)
- 2009 – Honorary Patron of the University Philosophical Society, Trinity College, Dublin
- 2009 – Appointed Member of the Order of the British Empire (MBE) in Her Majesty Queen Elizabeth II Birthday 2009 Honours List for Services to the Fashion Industry
- 2010 – International Award, Council of Fashion Designers of America
- 2011 – Honorary-doctorate degree from Sheffield Hallam University, Yorkshire
- 2013 – Menswear Designer of the Year 2013, British Fashion Awards (UK)
- 2013 – Honorary-doctorate degree, Royal College of Art, London
