= Gerry Murphy (businessman) =

Irish businessman (born 1955)

- Born: 6 November 1955 (age 70); Kilkenny, Ireland
- Occupation: Businessman
- Known for: Chair of Tesco

Gerard Martin Murphy (born 6 November 1955) is an Irish businessman and the chairman of Burberry and Tesco. He is the former chairman of Tate & Lyle.

== Early life ==
Murphy was born on 6 November 1955 in Kilkenny, Ireland, and grew up in Cork. He earned a BSc and PhD in food science and technology. He attended University College Dublin graduating with an MBS in 1983 in marketing.

== Career ==
In 1978, he started to work at the product development division of Express Foods Ireland where he worked on the R&D of the Baileys Irish Cream. In 1991, he joined the direction of the newly-formed group Greencore. In 1995, after unsatisfying results at Greencore, he left to lead the National Freight Company, and successfully led its merger with Ocean Group plc in 2000. He was the CEO of Carlton Communications from 2000 to 2002.

He followed his career at the Bank of Ireland. He climbed the ladder up to taking on the management of the advertising division. The rest of his career consisted of senior roles at FTSE 100 companies. He was a non-executive director at Reckitt Benckiser, and then CEO of Kingfisher plc from 2003 to 2008. In March 2008, he was appointed London-based senior managing director of Blackstone. He became chairman of Tate & Lyle in January 2017. In April 2018, he was also appointed chairman of Burberry.

In 2023, he was named chairman of Tesco, and resigned from his role at Tate & Lyle.

== Positions ==
In 2023, Murphy openly criticized Rishi Sunak's decision to stop VAT refunds for tourists.
