= Salvatore Ferragamo Museum =

Fashion museum in Italy

Coordinates: 43°46′10.54″N 11°15′3.57″E

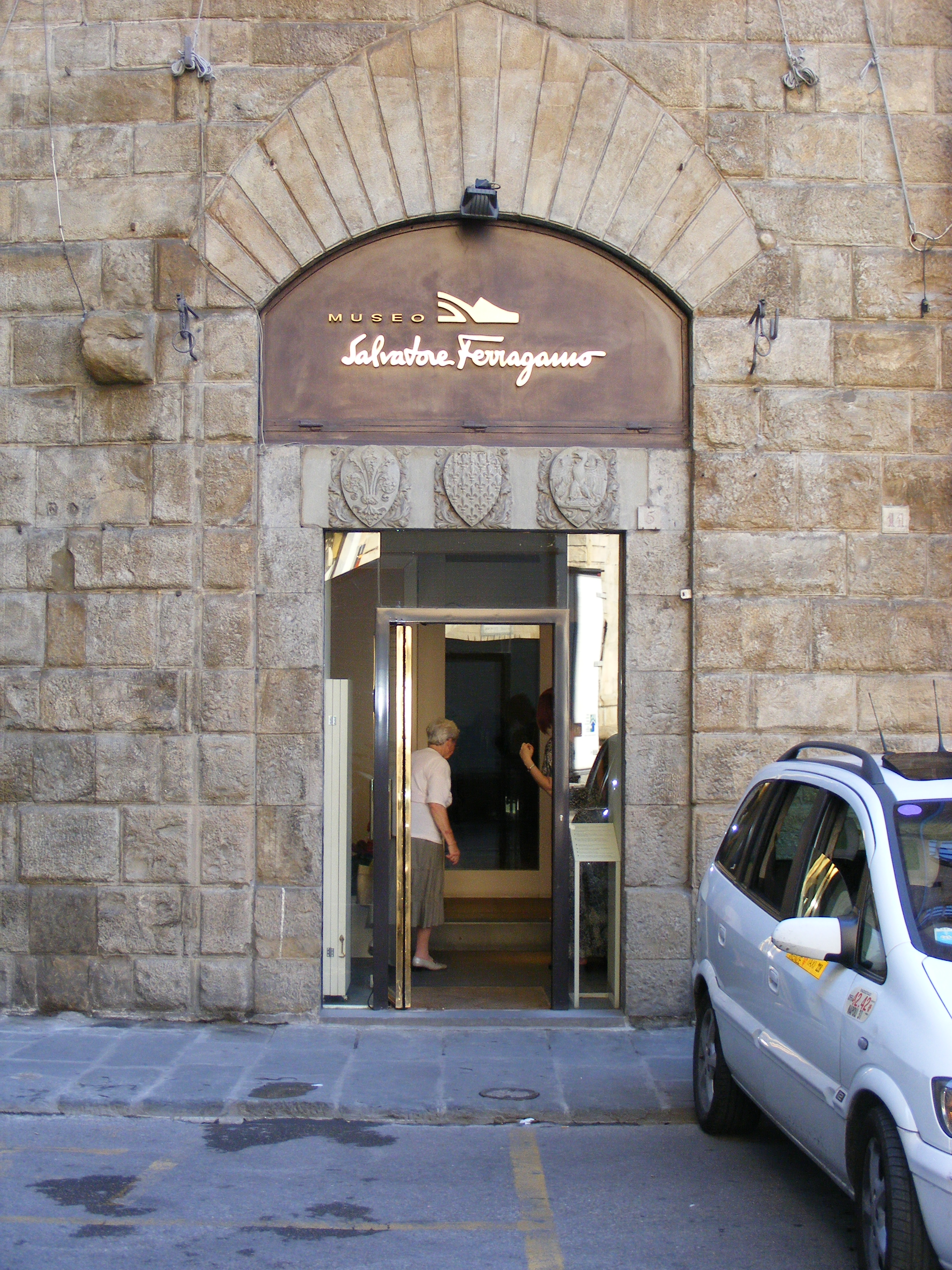
- Location: 5 rosso Piazza Santa Trinita, Florence, Italy
- Type: Fashion museum
- Director: Stefania Ricci
- Website: Ferragamo.com/museo/

The Salvatore Ferragamo Museum in Florence, Italy, is a fashion museum dedicated to the life and work of Italian shoe designer Salvatore Ferragamo and his eponymous company.

== History ==
The museum opened in May 1995 following the success of a touring history of Ferragamo's company.

== Description ==
The museum contains 10,000 models of shoes created and owned by Ferragamo from the 1920s until his death in 1960. Following Ferragamo's death, the collection was expanded by his widow and children. The museum also includes films, press cuttings, advertising materials, clothes and accessories from the 1950s to the present day.

The museum is housed in the historic Palazzo Spini Feroni, which was purchased by Ferragamo in the 1930s.

In 2012, the museum had 21,590 visitors.

== Gallery ==
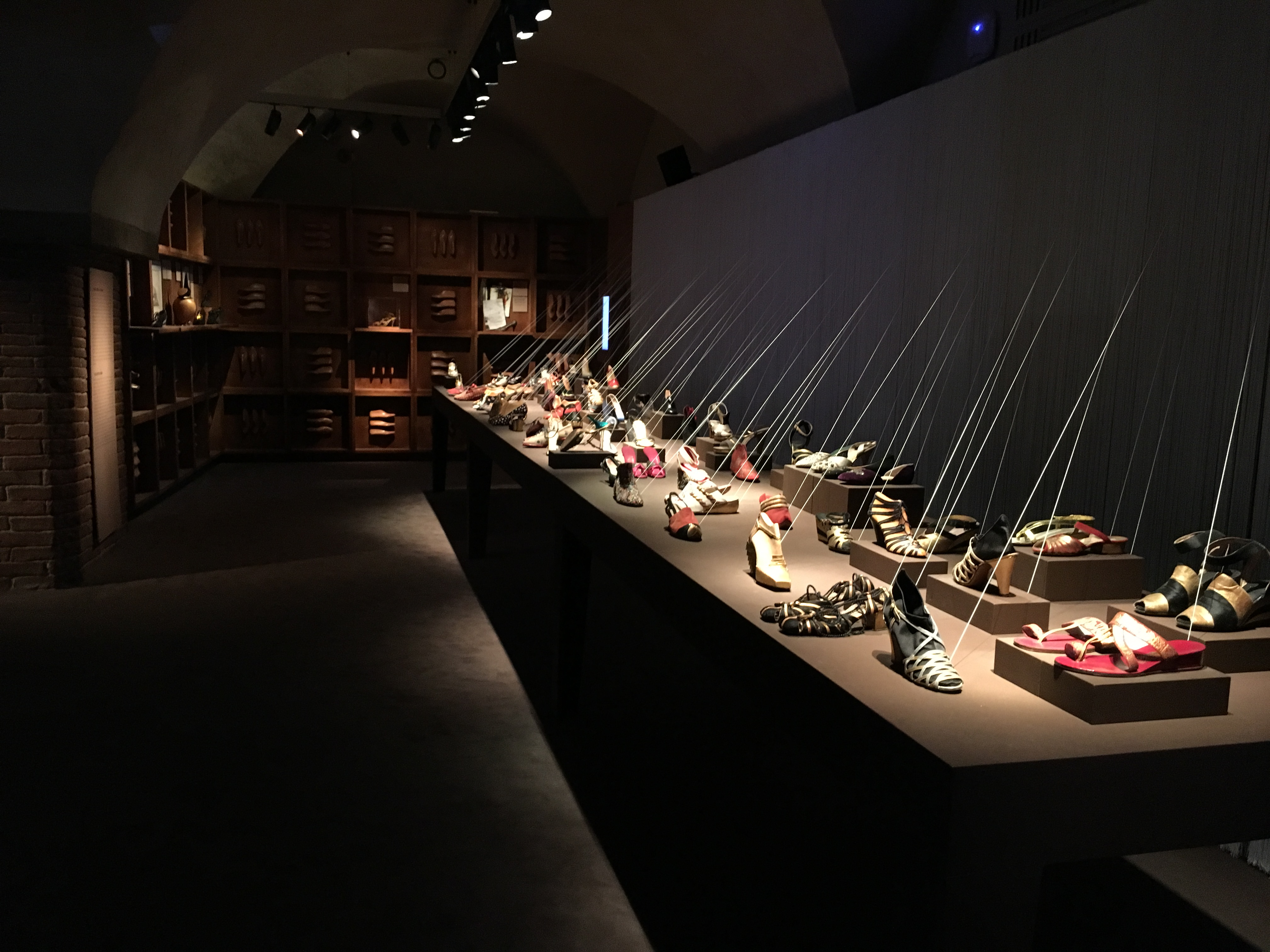

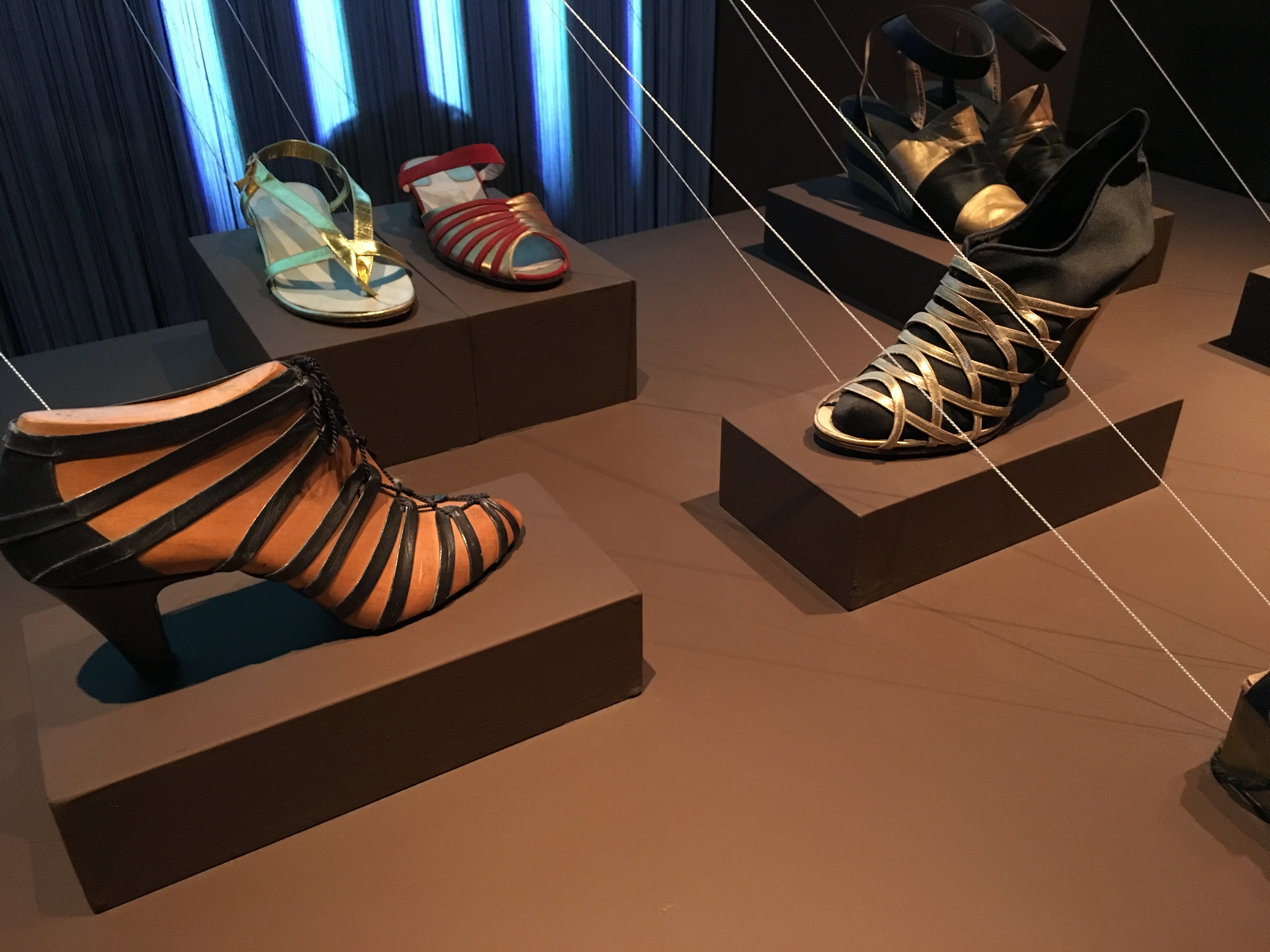

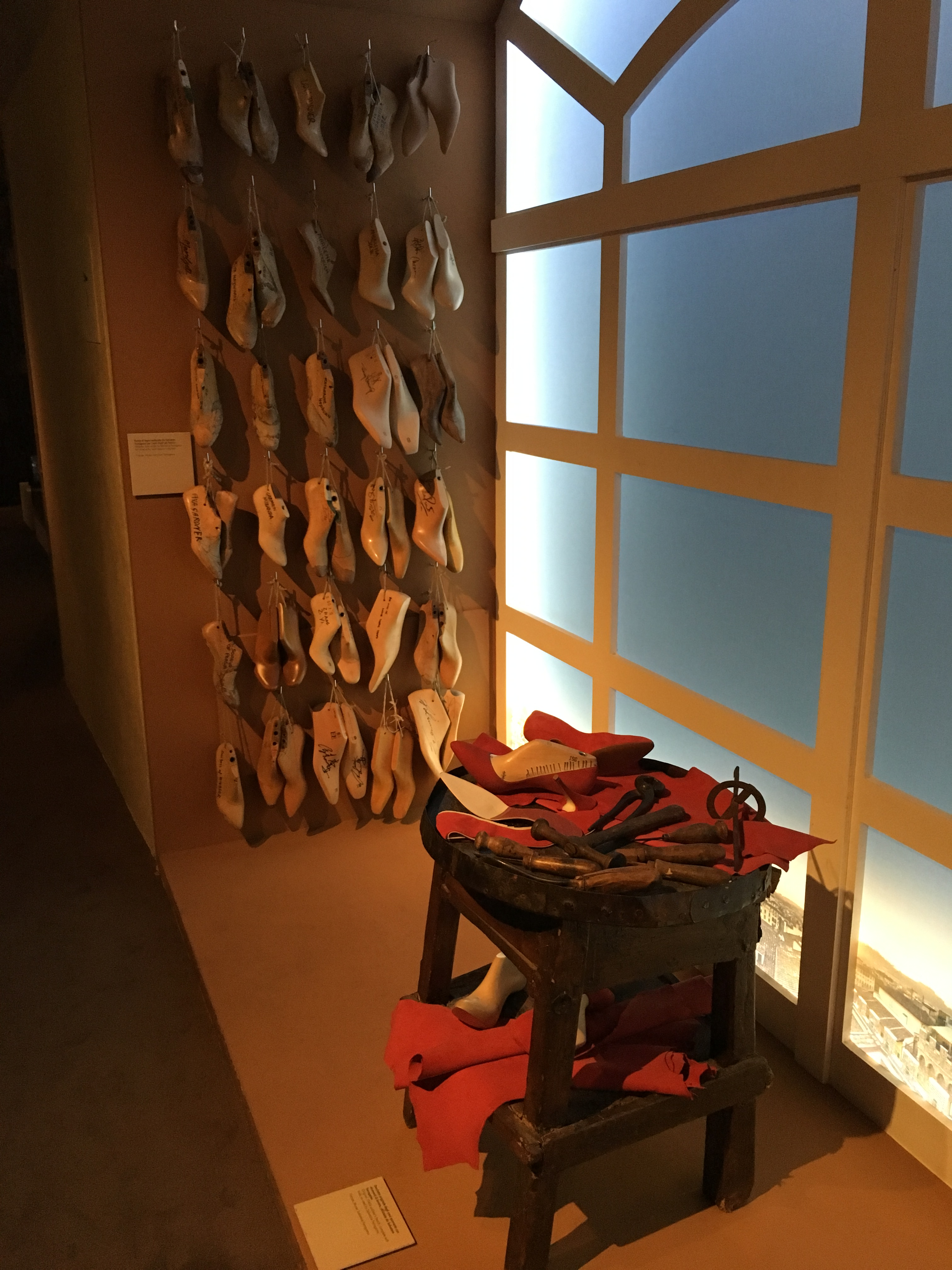

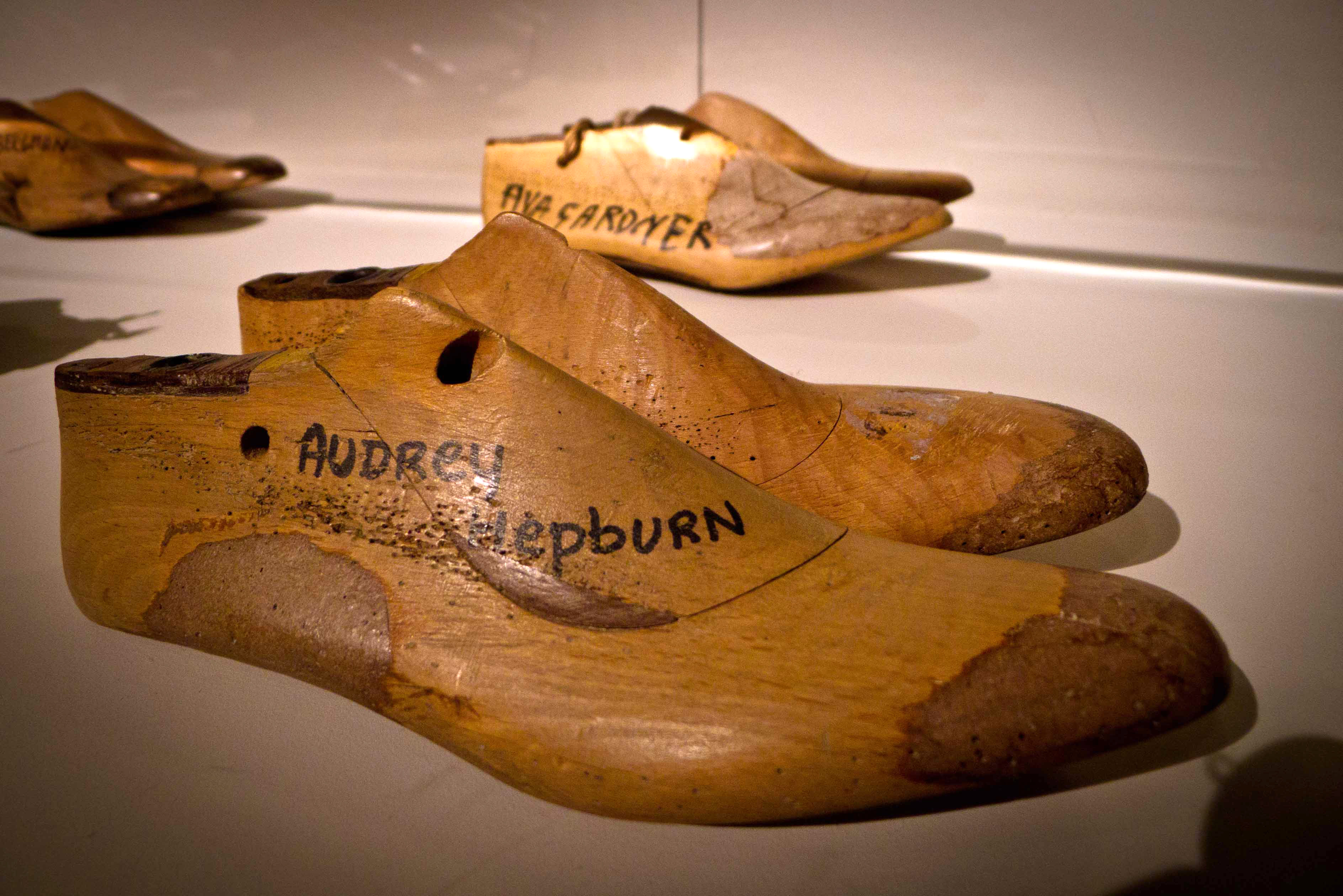
The personal lasts of Audrey Hepburn and Ava Gardner

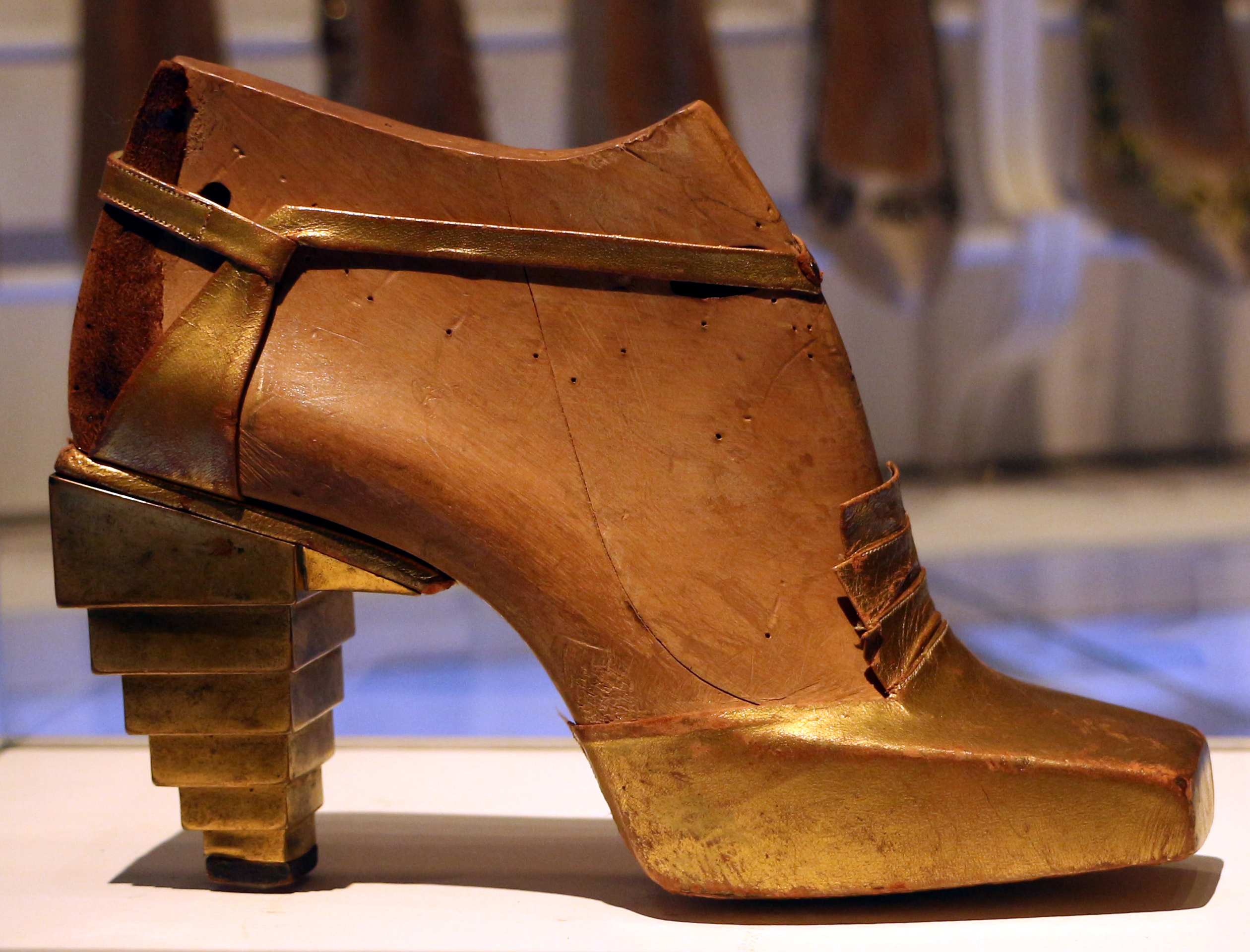

== Bibliography ==
- Iannone, Floriana; Izzo, Francesco (2017). Salvatore Ferragamo: An Italian heritage brand and its museum. Springer.
