= Luis De Javier =

Spanish fashion designer

Luis De Javier is a Spanish fashion designer based in London. He launched his namesake label in 2020, which is known for its avant-garde aesthetic. He was mentored by designer Riccardo Tisci.
