= Bonito, Campania =

Bonito
- Comune
- Comune di Bonito
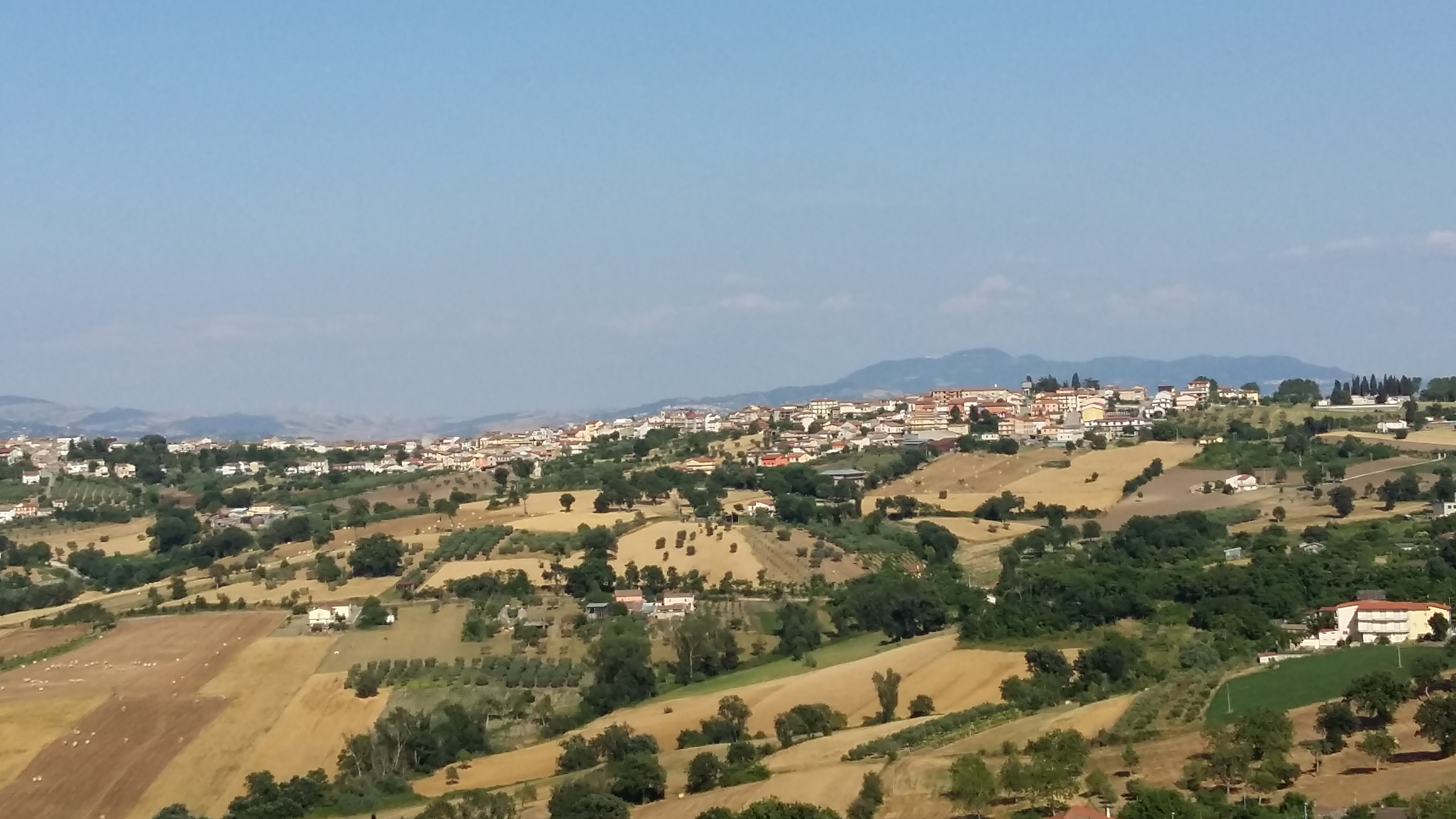

- Location within Italy Location within Campania
- Coordinates: 41°5′55″N 15°0′8″E
- Country: Italy
- Region: Campania
- Province: Avellino (AV)
- Frazioni: Morroni

Area
  - Total: 18.62 km^{2} (7.19 sq mi)
- Elevation: 490 m (1,610 ft)

Population (2005)
  - Total: 2,540
  - Density: 136/km^{2} (353/sq mi)
- Demonym: Bonitesi
- Time zone: UTC+1 (CET)
  - Summer (DST): UTC+2 (CEST)
- Postal code: 83032
- Dialing code: 0825
- Patron saint: San Bonito di Clermont
- Saint day: 15 January
- Website: Official website

Bonito is a comune in the Province of Avellino, in the Region of Campania, Italy. Located in the southern Apennines upon a rounded knoll, it overlooks the Ufita Valley within the historical district of Irpinia.

The town is part of the Roman Catholic Diocese of Ariano Irpino-Lacedonia and its territory borders with the municipalities of Apice, Grottaminarda, Melito Irpino, and Mirabella Eclano.

== People ==
- Salvatore Ferragamo (1898–1960), Italian fashion shoe designer, as well as his wife Wanda (1921–2018), were born in Bonito.
