= Paul Andrew (designer) =

English fashion designer

Paul Andrew is an English fashion designer. He launched his eponymous women's footwear line in September 2012. He is creative director of Italian shoe brand Sergio Rossi and, previously, at Salvatore Ferragamo.

== Career ==
In his early career, Andrew worked with designers such as Narciso Rodriguez, Calvin Klein, and Alexander McQueen. He then spent 10 years working for Donna Karan.

In 2012, Andrew launched his eponymous women's shoe brand. In 2016, he was named the director of women's footwear design at Salvatore Ferragamo. In 2019, he became the company's creative director. In 2021, Andrew left Ferragamo, and in 2022, he relaunched his own footwear line. He was succeeded as Ferragamo's creative director by Maximilian Davis.

In July 2024, Andrew joined Sergio Rossi as its creative director.

== Notable awards ==
Year	Award	Notes
2014	The 11th annual Council of Fashion Designers of America/Vogue Fashion Fund	Andrew was the first British footwear designer to win.
2016	The Council of Fashion Designers of America Swarovski Award for Accessory Design	
2016	ACE Award for Brand Launch of the Year	
2016	Designer of the Year, The Footwear News Achievement Awards	
