= Salvatore Ferragamo =

Italian shoe designer (1898–1960)

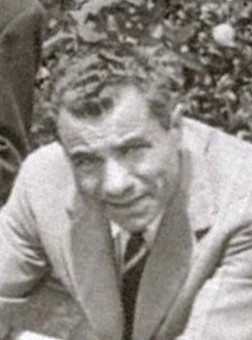
- Ferragamo c. 1959
- Born: 5 June 1898; Bonito, Campania, Italy
- Died: 7 August 1960 (aged 62); Florence, Italy
- Education: University of Southern California
- Occupation: Shoe designer
- Known for: Founder of Salvatore Ferragamo S.p.A.
- Spouse: Wanda Miletti (m. 1940)
- Children: 6, including Fiamma
- Relatives: James Ferragamo (grandson)

Salvatore Ferragamo (Italian: [salvaˈtoːre ferraˈɡaːmo]; 5 June 1898 – 7 August 1960) was an Italian shoe designer. Widely regarded as one of the most influential figures in 20th-century footwear design, he was known for combining artisanal craftsmanship with technical innovation. Ferragamo pioneered new construction methods that emphasized comfort, balance, and structural support while maintaining elegance. His shoes were worn by leading figures of Hollywood, earning him the nickname "Shoemaker to the Stars."

After early success in the United States, Ferragamo returned to Italy in 1927, where he established a workshop in Florence that became the foundation of his international business, Salvatore Ferragamo S.p.A. Throughout the 1930s and 1940s, he developed influential designs—including the cork wedge heel and reinforced shank—often in response to material shortages, which helped redefine women's footwear. Following his death in 1960, the company was continued by his family and evolved into the luxury fashion house Ferragamo. His legacy is preserved through the Salvatore Ferragamo Museum in Florence. His life and work were the subject of the 2020 documentary film Salvatore: Shoemaker of Dreams.

== Biography ==
=== Early life ===
Salvatore (registered as "Salvadore") Ferragamo was born in 1898 to a poor family in Bonito, Avellino, in the Campania region, the eleventh of fourteen children of Antonio Ferragamo and Mariantonia Ferragamo (both were born with the same surname, which often happened in smaller Italian towns). After making his first pair of shoes for himself, a pair of high heels, at age nine (and his sisters to wear at their confirmation), young Salvatore decided that he had found his calling.

=== Early career and training ===
Ferragamo showed an early interest in shoemaking after studying shoemaking in Naples for a year, 14-year-old Ferragamo opened a small store based in his parents' home. In 1914, he emigrated to Boston, Massachusetts, where one of his brothers worked in a shoe factory. After working at the factory for a week, he relocated to Santa Barbara, California to join his brothers. Ferragamo studied anatomy at the University of Southern California to learn how to make his shoes more comfortable.

=== Hollywood and early success ===
Ferragamo established a workshop and began creating made-to-measure shoes for the fledgling film industry. His craftsmanship quickly attracted attention, leading him to design boots for Westerns at Flying A Studios and bespoke shoes for actors such as Mary Pickford and Lillian Gish, helping to solidify his reputation in Hollywood. By the early 1920s, Ferragamo had established himself as a specialist in custom footwear for film actors. In 1923, he purchased the Hollywood Boot Shop on Hollywood Boulevard, attracting clients such as Rudolph Valentino, Gloria Swanson, Joan Crawford, and Clara Bow. His work for film stars earned him the nickname "Shoemaker to the Stars."

=== Return to Italy, innovation, and postwar expansion ===
In August 1927, Ferragamo returned to Italy seeking greater control over production quality. He initially sought to establish his headquarters in Naples, but he was dismissed as an "Italo-American go-getter, a hustler, and expatriate with the usual quota of high-pressure ideas from across the Atlantic. Other cities in Southern Italy proved no more receptive. After unsuccessful attempts in Rome, he traveled north to Verona, Milan, and Turin, and later to Venice and Padua, encountering the same rejection in each city. Ferragamo ultimately settled in Florence, where he established a workshop in the Via Mannelli. There, working directly with artisans under his supervision, he developed innovative designs and production methods that laid the foundation for his future success.

During this period, he created shoes for many leading actors of the era, including "The Bella," a pair of black calfskin pumps with ankle straps and oversized vanilla bows worn by Gloria Swanson in the 1928 film Sadie Thompson.

In 1933, he filed for bankruptcy in 1933 due to bad management and economic pressure. Despite financial difficulties caused by the Great Depression, he developed several technical innovations. including the cork wedge heel and the steel shank, which improved stability and allowed for new silhouettes. These designs helped define women's footwear during the era and reinforced Ferragamo’s reputation as both a designer and an innovator.

"The Rainbow" shoe was created by Salvatore Ferragamo in 1938 and was the first instance of the platform shoe returning in modern days in the West. The platform sandal, using shaped slabs of cork covered in suede with gold kidskin straps, was designed for Judy Garland.

Material shortages during World War II prompted Ferragamo to experiment with unconventional materials such as cork, raffia, and nylon, leading to some of his most distinctive designs. After the war, he resumed using luxury materials and expanded his business internationally. He was able to expand his operations in the 1950s, including a workforce of 700 artisans who made 350 pairs of shoes per day, by hand.

His shoes were worn by prominent figures including Maharani of Cooch Behar, Eva Perón, Marilyn Monroe, and Audrey Hepburn further solidifying the brand’s association with glamour and craftsmanship.

=== Later years and death ===
In 1957, Ferragamo published his autobiography Shoemaker of Dreams.

Ferragamo continued to oversee the company until his death on August 7, 1960 at the age of 62. Afterward, the business was carried on by his family, evolving into the global luxury fashion house Salvatore Ferragamo. He was survived by his wife Wanda and six children (Fiamma, Giovanna, Fulvia, Ferruccio, Massimo and Leonardo.

== Family ==
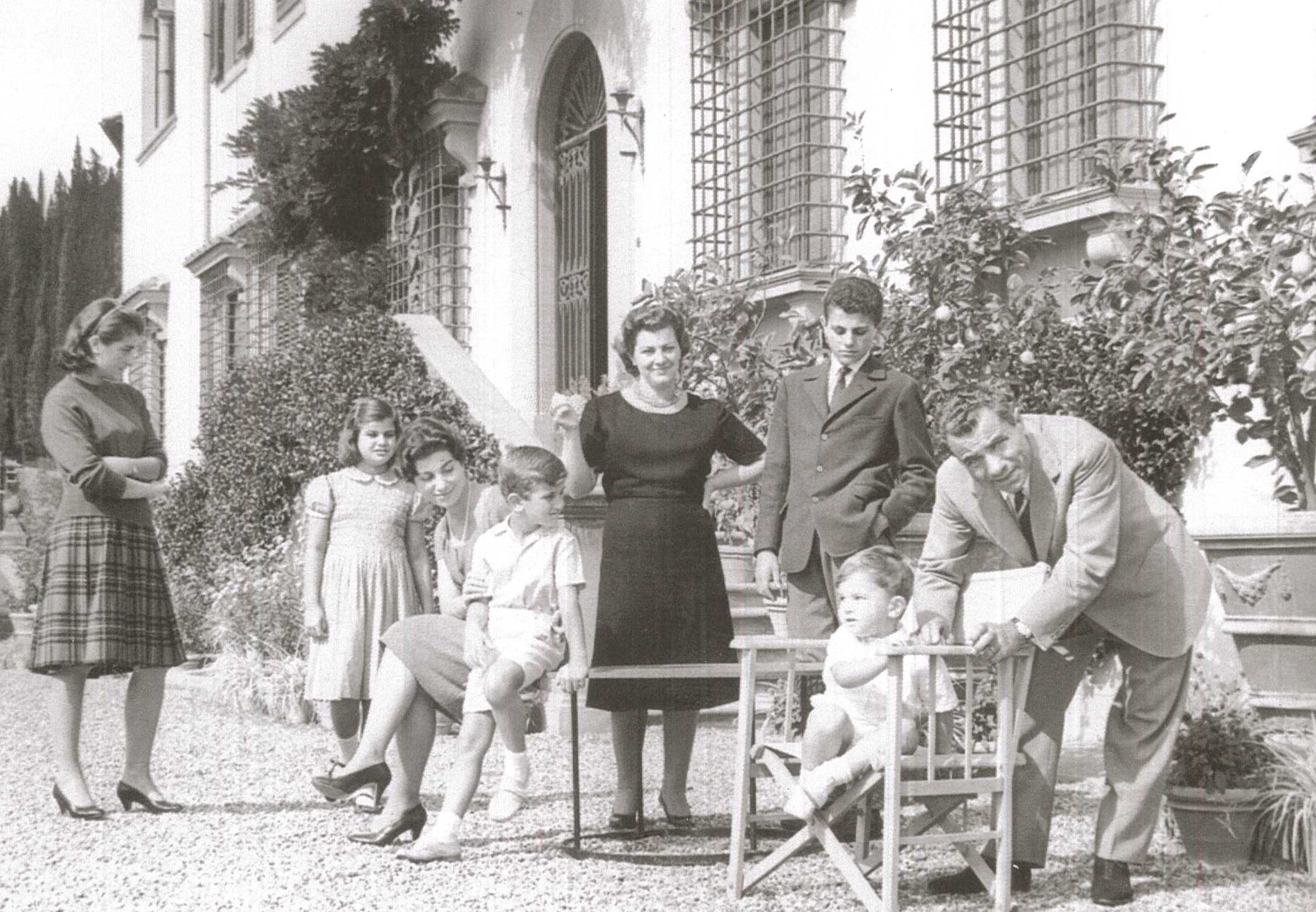
Salvatore Ferragamo and his family in Fiesole

- Wanda Ferragamo Miletti led the group since 1960, when her husband and founder of the company, Salvatore, died. She was honorary chairman until her death in 2018.
- Ferruccio Ferragamo, chairman of the company
- Giovanna Gentile-Ferragamo, vice president of Salvatore Ferragamo SpA
- Leonardo Ferragamo, since 2000, has been the Director of Salvatore Ferragamo SpA, Ferragamo Finanziaria; Executive Vice President of the Fondazione Ferragamo and owner of Finnish luxury yacht builder OY Nautor Swan.
- Massimo Ferragamo, Chairman of Ferragamo USA.
- Fulvia Visconti-Ferragamo, who died in March 2018, ran the fashion label's silk accessories division beginning in the 1970s. She was the Deputy Chairwoman of Ferragamo Finanziaria SpA.
- Fiamma Ferragamo di San Giuliano, who died in 1998, was involved in the creation of some of the brand's products, such as Vara shoe and the Gancino.
- James Ferragamo, Women's and Men's Shoes and Leather Goods Division Director for the Salvatore Ferragamo Group
- Angelica Visconti Ruspoli, South Europe Director
- Diego Paternò di San Giuliano coordinates the digital activities of the brand.

== Legacy ==
The Salvatore Ferragamo company expanded its operations to include bags, eyewear, silk accessories, watches, perfumes and a ready-to-wear clothing line in addition to their luxury shoes. The company is owned by the Ferragamo family, which in November 2006 included Salvatore's widow Wanda, five children, 23 grandchildren and other relatives. There is a rule that only three members of the family can work at the company, prompting fierce competition.

The Salvatore Ferragamo Museum, dedicated to Ferragamo's life and work, opened in the Palazzo Spini Feroni in 1995. The palazzo had been bought by Ferragamo in the 1930s.

In March 2013, the Ferragamo fashion house established the Ferragamo Foundation in Florence. The foundation was formed to cultivate young fashion designers, based on the ideas of Salvatore Ferragamo.

In 2020, the documentary film Salvatore: Shoemaker of Dreams directed by Luca Guadagnino was released about his life and career.
