= Stasia Evasuk =

Canadian writer and journalist

Stastia Evasuk
- Born: June 12, 1924; Glace Bay, Nova Scotia, Canada
- Died: May 28, 2009 (aged 84); Brantford, Ontario, Canada
- Occupation: Journalist
- Years active: 1944-1991

Stasia Evasuk (June 12, 1924 – May 28, 2009) was a Canadian writer and journalist known for her support of the Canadian fashion industry and Age of Reason, an award-winning column regarding the lives of seniors.

== Early life ==
Anastasia Evasuk was born in Glace Bay, Nova Scotia, on June 12, 1924. She was the eldest child of John and Annie (nee Makahon) Evasuk. Her father, an immigrant from Ukraine, worked in a local coal mine and her mother was an immigrant from Romania. Evasuk attended St. Anne's High School, graduating in 1942. She landed a job as a general reporter at the Glace Bay Gazette covering local news and labour issues tied to the coal mining industry.

== Career ==
Evasuk moved to Toronto with a friend in 1944. She met Toronto Star reporter Don Reid while working at the Canadian Bank of Commerce, who helped her get a job at the newspaper. She worked at the Star from 1944 to 1960, at which time she moved to Vancouver and worked at the Vancouver Sun until 1962. She moved back to Toronto in 1962, landing a job at the Toronto Telegram, and returned to the Toronto Star in 1964, where she remained until her retirement in 1991.

Evasuk was best known for her fashion writing and her support of the Canadian fashion industry. The role included international travel and attendance at major fashion shows. During the later years of her career, Evasuk wrote Age of Reason, a column that focused on seniors and was published in the Toronto Star's Life section. She took over the column from Lotta Dempsey in 1981. Evasuk received an award from the Ontario Association for Community Living in 1991 for her piece "Who will care for them?" about aging parents caring for disabled children. Two years later she received an award for the column in 1993 from the Canadian Ethnic Journalists' and Writers' Club for "continuing recognition of the presence and dignity of ethnic seniors in her widely read column".

== Death ==
Evasuk died May 28, 2009, in Brantford, Ontario.
