= Maximilian Davis =

British fashion designer

- Born: 1994 or 1995 (age 31–32); Manchester, England
- Education: London College of Fashion
- Occupation: Fashion designer
- Title: Creative director, Salvatore Ferragamo
- Term: March 2022–present

Maximilian Davis (born 1994 or 1995) is a British fashion designer who has been the creative director of Ferragamo since March 2022.

Born in Manchester to a Trinidadian-Jamaican family, Davis founded his own label, Maximilian, in 2020, after graduating from the London College of Fashion. In 2022, he was a semifinalist for the LVMH Prize, but withdrew from the competition when he was appointed at Ferragamo, where he succeeded Paul Andrew. He presented his debut collection for the house in September 2022, and in December 2023 he won British Womenswear Designer of the Year at The Fashion Awards.

== Early life and education ==
Davis was born in Manchester to Trinidadian and Jamaican parents. His father studied fashion design, and his mother and sister worked as models. When Davis was six, his grandmother taught him to sew on her industrial machine; while still in high school, he apprenticed with the tailor who made his mother's clothes. He graduated from the London College of Fashion in 2017.

== Career ==
=== Maximilian label ===
After graduating, Davis worked as a junior designer for Grace Wales Bonner and as a freelance designer for Mowalola, Asai, and Supriya Lele. In 2020, he launched his own label, Maximilian, presenting his first collection in autumn 2020. Inspired by Trinidad's Carnival, the collection formed part of what Davis has described as a vision of "Black elegance". The label showed with Fashion East, the London talent incubator founded by Lulu Kennedy, and was stocked at retailers including Ssense, MatchesFashion, and Net-a-Porter; Rihanna and Dua Lipa wore his designs. In early 2022, Davis was shortlisted as one of twenty semifinalists for the LVMH Prize, but withdrew from the competition before the Paris showroom. The Maximilian label was put on hold after he joined Ferragamo.

=== Salvatore Ferragamo ===
On 14 March 2022, Ferragamo announced Davis as its new creative director, effective 16 March; he succeeded Paul Andrew, who had left the brand the previous year. The appointment was the first major move by chief executive Marco Gobbetti, who had joined the company from Burberry that January.

Davis presented his debut collection for the house, for spring 2023, on 24 September 2022, in the open-air courtyard of a historic Milanese seminary being converted into the Portrait Milano hotel. Ahead of the show, the house cleared its social media accounts and introduced a reworked logo to mark what it called a new chapter. The collection drew on founder Salvatore Ferragamo's beginnings as a shoemaker to Hollywood stars, with crystal embellishments that nodded to a pair of red shoes he made for Marilyn Monroe in 1959.

His spring 2025 collection took dance as its theme, prompted by a 1950 photograph of Salvatore Ferragamo fitting shoes on the dancer and choreographer Katherine Dunham, whose art was shaped by her research in the Caribbean, and by Rudolf Nureyev, who danced in Ferragamo shoes in the 1980s. His spring 2026 show, held at the Portrait Milano, the site of his debut, on 27 September 2025, looked to the 1920s, taking a 1925 photograph of the silent-film actress Lola Todd as a starting point. For autumn 2026, Davis stayed with the 1920s: the collection, presented in Milan on 28 February 2026, combined nautical dress with references to the era's speakeasies and to the American artist Charles Demuth.

Alongside the runway collections, Davis has dressed actresses including Michaela Coel, Zendaya, Ayo Edebiri, and Yara Shahidi, and a silver lamé dress from his autumn 2023 collection, titled "Cinema", was worn by Beyoncé on her Renaissance World Tour. In early 2026, rumours circulated that Davis might leave Ferragamo to succeed Pieter Mulier at Alaïa; the house denied the reports.

== Awards ==
In December 2023, Davis won British Womenswear Designer of the Year at The Fashion Awards, for his work at Ferragamo; the ceremony was held at the Royal Albert Hall in London.
