= Wanda Ferragamo =

Italian fashion designer and businesswoman

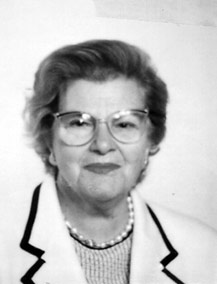
- Ferragamo in 1987
- Born: Wanda Miletti; 18 December 1921; Bonito, Kingdom of Italy
- Died: 18 October 2018 (aged 96); Florence, Italy
- Label: Ferragamo
- Spouse: Salvatore Ferragamo (m. 1940; died 1960)
- Children: 6: Fiamma; Ferruccio; Giovanna; Fulvia; Leonardo; Massimo
- Father: Fulvio Miletti
- Relatives: James Ferragamo (grandson)
- Awards: Donna Internazionale dell'anno (1982); Knight of Labour of the Italian Republic (1987); Honorary Officer of the British Empire (1995)

Wanda Ferragamo (née Miletti; 18 December 1921 – 19 October 2018) was an Italian fashion designer and businesswoman. She was the head designer of Ferragamo.

She was born in Bonito, Avellino, the daughter of Fulvio Miletti, the podestà and municipal doctor of the town, physician of the Ferragamo family and their client. During the summer of 1940, at the age of 18 years old, she met and then married Salvatore Ferragamo, in the church of Santa Lucia in Naples. From their marriage, six children were born: Fiamma, Ferruccio, Giovanna, Fulvia, Leonardo and Massimo.

After the wedding, they moved to a villa near Fiesole, Florence. Following the death of her husband in 1960, Wanda took over the family-owned manufacturer, thus becoming the CEO for more than 20 years. She grew up in a wealthy family, so she was attending school as her mother did, but she had no specific professional training: as a result, she learned how to manage a company by watching and listening to her husband. Since then, the company turned from a footwear company to a ready-to-wear and fashion wear with expanded product lines, thanks also to the help of her children.

She died in Florence on October 18, 2018 at the age of 96.
