= Salvatore Ferragamo (company) =

Italian luxury fashion company

Salvatore Ferragamo S.p.A.

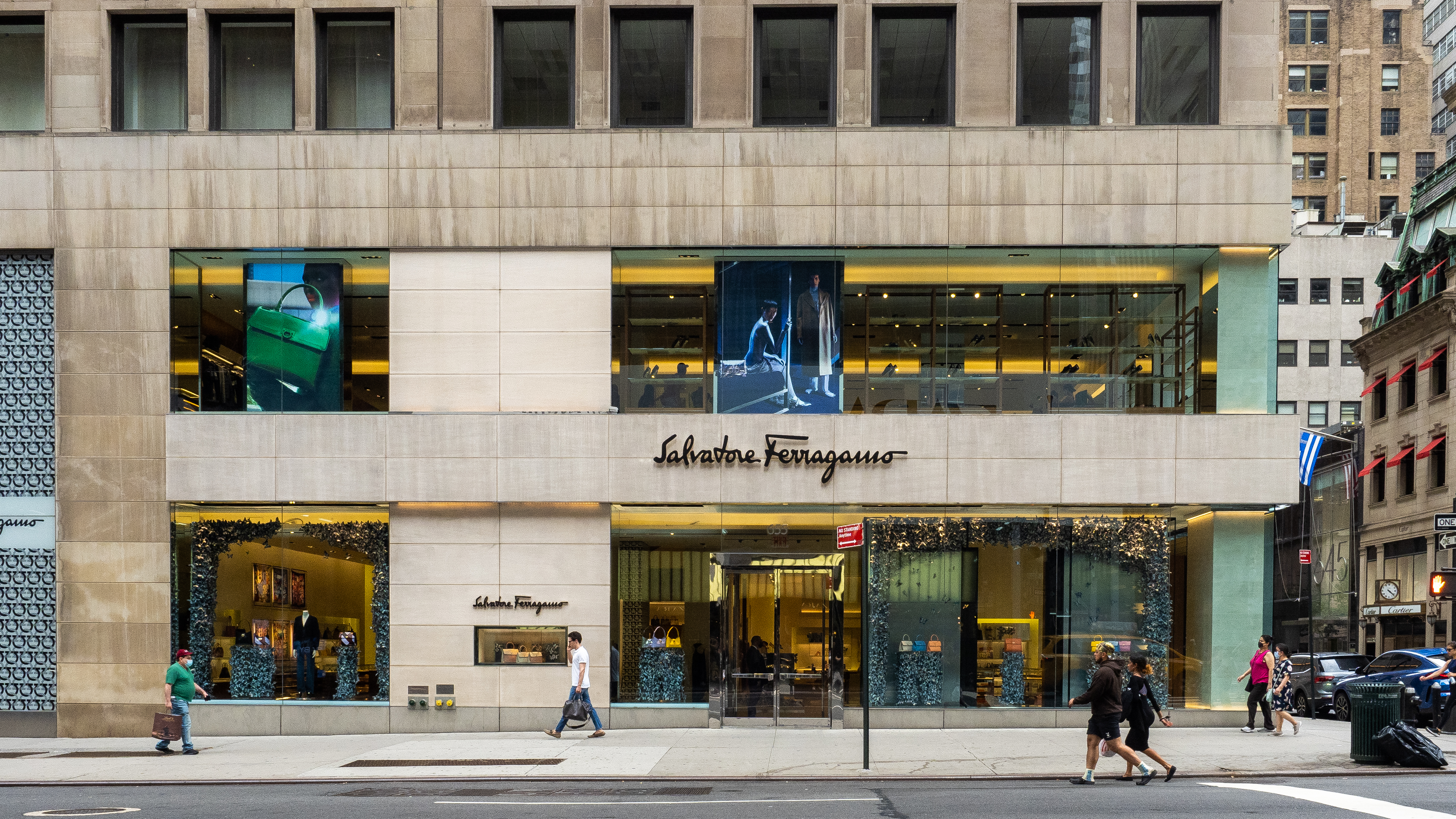
- Location on 5th Avenue, Manhattan
- Company type: Public (società per azioni)
- Traded as: BIT: SFER; FTSE Italia Mid Cap
- ISIN: IT0004712375
- Industry: Fashion
- Founded: 1927; 99 years ago in Florence, Italy
- Founder: Salvatore Ferragamo
- Headquarters: Florence, Italy
- Number of locations: 447 (2022)
- Area served: Worldwide
- Key people: Leonardo Ferragamo (Chairman); Marco Gobbetti (CEO); Maximilian Davis (Creative Director)
- Products: Footwear; leather goods; apparel; fashion accessories; perfumes
- Revenue: ▲€1.136 billion (2021)
- Operating income: ▲€143.480 million (2021)
- Net income: ▲€81.137 million (2021)
- Total assets: ▼€1.010 billion (2021)
- Total equity: ▲€785.879 million (2021)
- Owner: Ferragamo Family (65%)
- Number of employees: 3887 (2021)
- Website: ferragamo.com

Salvatore Ferragamo S.p.A. (Italian: [salvaˈtoːre ferraˈɡaːmo]), doing business as Ferragamo, is an Italian luxury fashion house focused on apparel, footwear, and accessories headquartered in Florence, Italy. It specializes in designing and manufacturing footwear and leather goods, which together account for over 86% of its revenue. The remaining products include ready-to-wear, silk products, fashion accessories, and licensed eyewear, watches, and perfumes. It operates 447 mono-brand stores worldwide as of September 2022.

The company was founded in 1927 by Salvatore Ferragamo in Florence. It went public on the Italian stock exchange in 2011, but the Ferragamo family has remained majority shareholders with approximately 65% stakes in the company. British designer Maximilian Davis has been the creative director of Ferragamo since March 2022.

== History ==
=== Founding ===
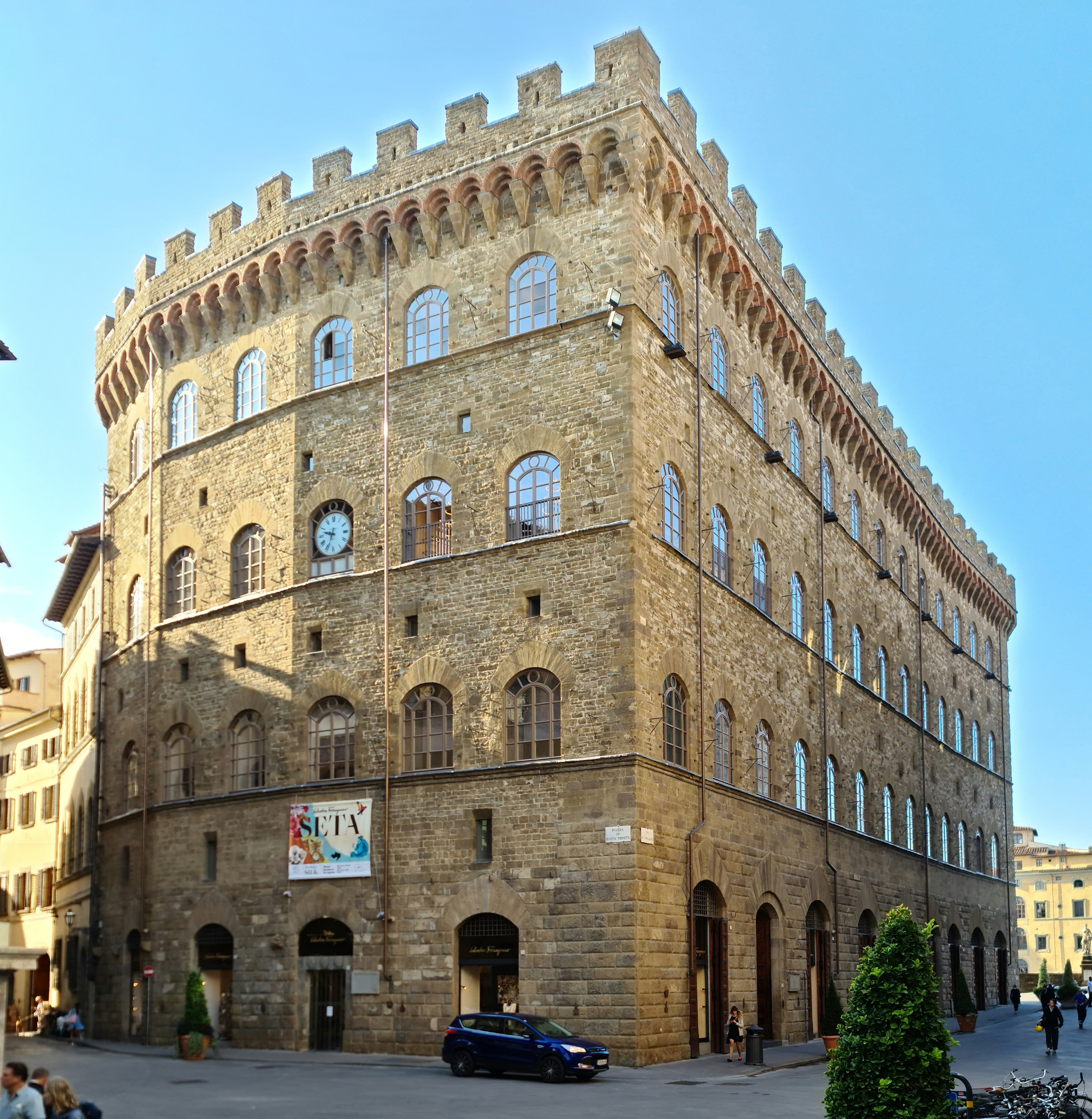
Palazzo Spini Feroni: The headquarters of Salvatore Ferragamo S.p.A. in Florence, 2021

In 1914, Salvatore Ferragamo emigrated from southern Italy to the United States to join his siblings, who had already emigrated to the U.S. He briefly worked at Thomas G. Plant Shoe Factory in Boston, Massachusetts, before moving to Santa Barbara, California, to join his brothers. He opened the Hollywood Boot Shop in 1923 and made shoes for movie stars, such as Rudolph Valentino, Clara Bow, Joan Crawford, Mary Pickford, and Gloria Swanson, as well as for films, such as Cecil B. DeMille's 1923 film The Ten Commandments.

Following his success in California, Ferragamo returned to Italy in 1927 to incorporate his eponymous label and open a factory to produce his shoes, due to a lack of artisan shoemakers in the U.S. His factory in Florence combined the city's artisanal techniques with the efficient production system of American factories, which became a training ground for apprentices.

As a result of the Great Depression and the company's reliance on businesses in the U.S., Ferragamo struggled financially and filed for bankruptcy in 1933. By 1938, he had recovered financially and purchased Palazzo Spini Feroni in Florence, which has housed the company's headquarters, flagship store, and Salvatore Ferragamo Museum since. In 1948, the company opened its first directly operated store in the U.S. at 424 Park Avenue in New York City.

The company faced financial challenges in 2024, reporting a net loss of €68 million, a significant decline from a €26 million profit in 2023. This downturn was attributed to decreased sales in key markets, particularly in Asia. Consequently, CEO Marco Gobbetti stepped down in March 2025, with Chairman Leonardo Ferragamo assuming interim executive responsibilities.

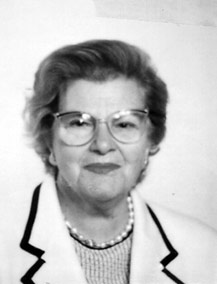
Wanda Miletti Ferragamo, wife of Salvatore and former CEO of Salvatore Ferragamo S.p.A., 1987

=== Death of Salvatore Ferragamo ===
Salvatore Ferragamo died in August 1960, leaving control of the growing company to his wife, Wanda Ferragamo. She expanded its operations to include silk scarves, fragrances, leather handbags, ready-to-wear, and small leather goods.

=== Recent developments ===
Despite several changes of leaderships and growth, the company remained privately held by the Ferragamo family until it went public on the Milan stock exchange in 2011. As of 2022, members of the Ferragamo family remain majority shareholders with approximately 65% combined stakes in the company, which is chaired by Leonardo Ferragamo, the fifth son of Salvatore and Wanda Ferragamo.

Marco Gobbetti, former CEO of Burberry, has been the CEO of the company since January 2022, succeeding Micaela le Divelec, who led the company since July 2018.

Salvatore Ferragamo announced it did not own stores in Russia and shipments to the franchise operation ceased after the Russian invasion of Ukraine.

In 2022, in an effort to modernize the brand, Salvatore Ferragamo was rebranded as "Ferragamo" (stylized as FERRAGAMO) and debuted a new logo ahead of its SS23 show during Milan Fashion Week. The show was the first under the creative direction of Maximilian Davis and was met with generally favorable responses, with critics noting the modernized tailoring. Davis described the collection as being about "ease and sensuality". Although revenue in the first nine months of 2023 was down 8.3% (with a 20% decline in US sales) compared to the same time period in 2022, CEO Marco Gobetti was "pleased by the early results" of Davis's work for Ferragamo.

== Products ==
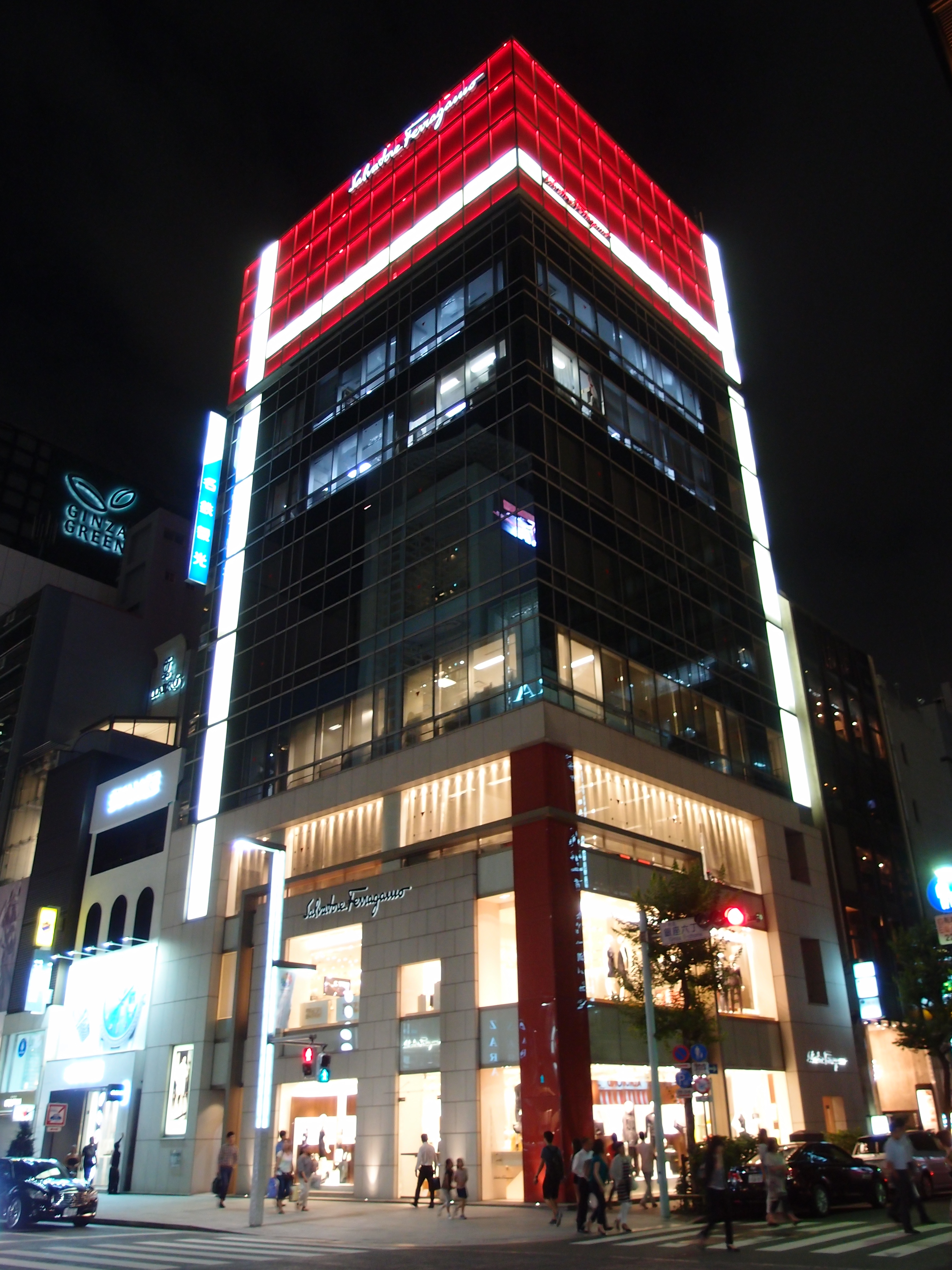
Salvatore Ferragamo store in Ginza, Tokyo, 2013

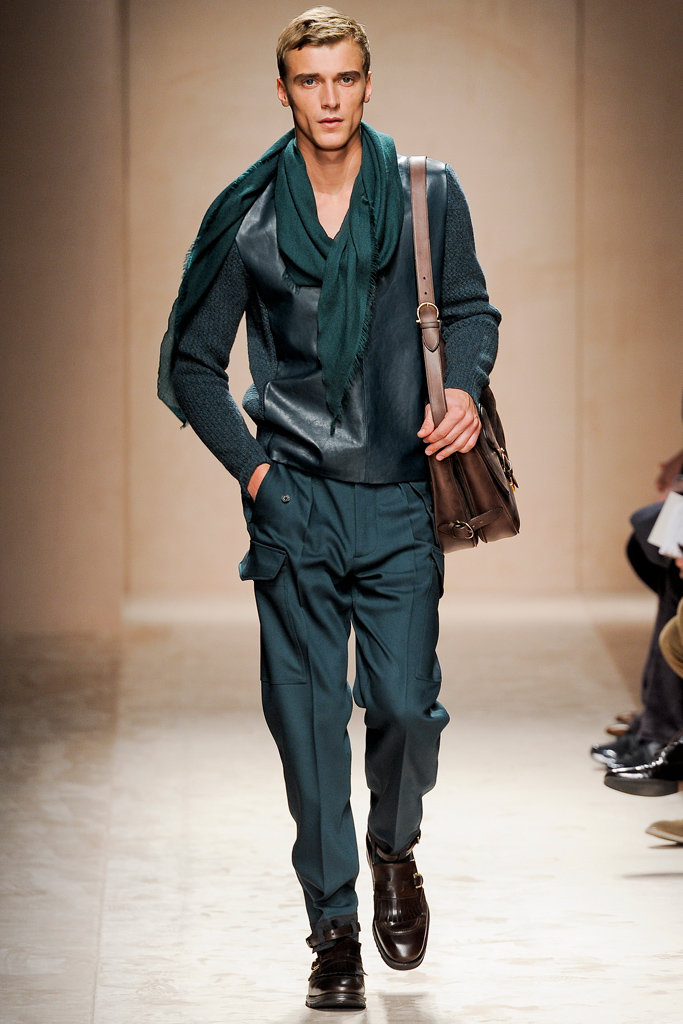
Salvatore Ferragamo Fall 2011

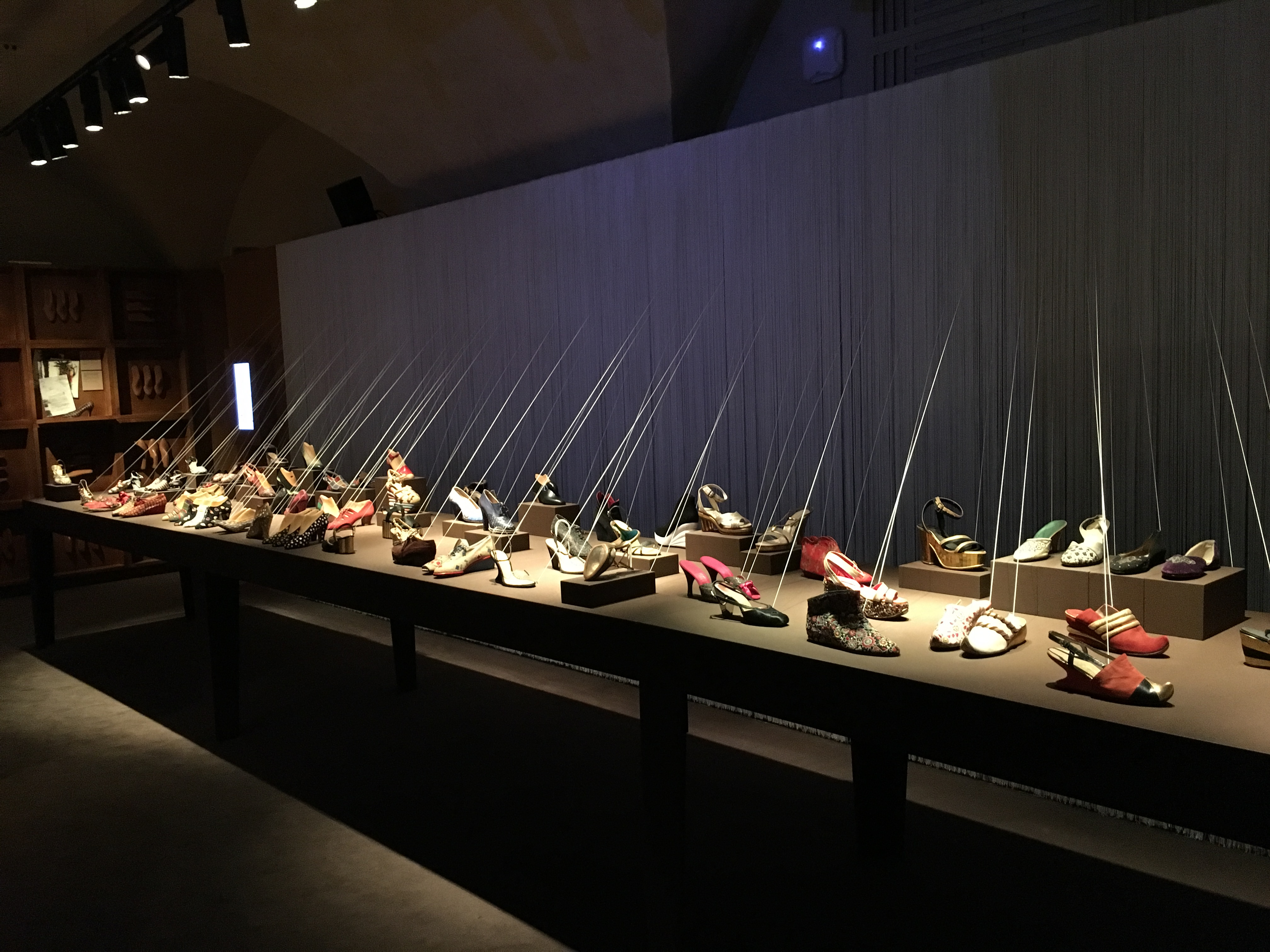
Shoes on display in Salvatore Ferragamo Museum, 2017

Throughout its history, the company has been known for innovative designs and use of materials; in California, Salvatore studied human anatomy in effort to make more comfortable shoes. Notable innovations include the wedge heel; the shell-shaped sole; the 'invisible' sandal; metal heels and soles, made famous by Marilyn Monroe; the 18-carat gold sandal; the sock-shoe; sculpture heels; and the gloved arch shoe, created for the Maharani of Cooch Behar in 1938. The company is also known for its 'Gancini' decoration, the 'Vara' patent ballet pump, the Salvatore bag, and its use of patchwork.

Footwear and leather goods are the focus of the brand, representing over 86% of its revenue in 2021. It also has an extensive range of women's and men's footwear, from formal, evening, to leisure wear. Men's footwear is manufactured using several techniques, including lasted, tubular, stitched, and "Tramezza" stitched welting. Leather goods, such as handbags, suitcases, belts, and wallets often feature the distinctive and signature "Gancino" clasp, which was originally designed as a handbag fastening. The company also offers made-to-order products for customers seeking unique designs not found in stores.

Other products include men and women's ready-to-wear and the brand's signature silk products, including ties, foulards, pocket square, and scarves. Ferragamo fragrances are produced and distributed by Inter Parfums, Inc. through an exclusive licensing agreement. The company also produces licensed eyewear and Swiss-made watches in partnership with Marchon and Timex Group. In 2014, Ferragamo began adding NFC tags to their products in an effort to discourage counterfeits.

== Creative directors ==
- 2011–2016: Massimiliano Giornetti
- 2019–2022: Paul Andrew
- 2022–present: Maximilian Davis

== Advertising ==
For its advertising campaigns, Salvatore Ferragamo has been working with photographers including David Sims (2013), Craig McDean (2016), Peter Lindbergh (2017), Walter Pfeiffer (2017), Luca Guadagnino (2020), Rafael Pavarotti (2023) and Tyler Mitchell (2023).

== Notable clients ==
Salvatore worked with film stars and celebrities from his earliest days in Hollywood. Clients over the years included Audrey Hepburn, Sophia Loren, and Greta Garbo, as well as Andy Warhol, Seulgi, Grace Mugabe, Princess Diana, and Namal Rajapaksha. The company made handbags for Margaret Thatcher and boots for Jigme Khesar Namgyal Wangchuck during his coronation on November 6, 2008, in Thimphu, Bhutan.

== See also ==
- Fashion in Italy, France, and the United States
- Christian Louboutin, Gucci, and Tod's
- Moët Hennessy Louis Vuitton (LVMH), Kering, and Richemont

== Awards and recognition ==
In 2022, Salvatore Ferragamo received the International Award "Leonardo The Immortal Light", conferred on 7 November 2022 by the International Committee Leonardo da Vinci during the celebrations marking the 560th anniversary of the Neoplatonic Academy. The recognition, presented at the headquarters of the Tuscany Region, honors individuals and institutions distinguished in the promotion of Italian culture and excellence.
