= Burberry =

British luxury fashion house

Burberry Group plc

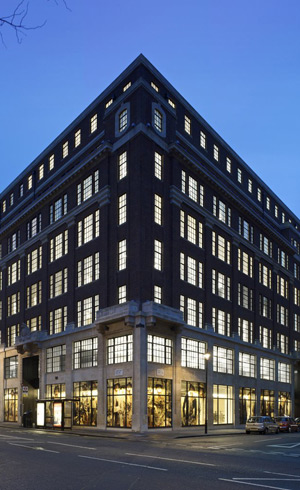
- Horseferry House, Burberry headquarters location in Westminster, London
- Type: Public limited company
- Traded as: LSE: BRBY; FTSE 100 component
- ISIN: GB0031743007
- Industry: Fashion
- Founded: 1856; 170 years ago in Basingstoke, England
- Founder: Thomas Burberry
- Headquarters: London, England, UK
- Number of locations: 410 (2026)
- Area served: Worldwide
- Key people: Gerry Murphy (chairperson); Joshua Schulman (CEO); Daniel Lee (CCO)
- Products: Ready-to-wear; handbags; leather accessories; footwear
- Revenue: ▼£2,420 million (2026)
- Operating income: ▲£115 million (2026)
- Net income: ▲£20 million (2026)
- Total assets: ▼£3,091 million (2026)
- Total equity: ▲£946 million (2026)
- Number of employees: 9,300 (2025)
- Website: burberry.com

Burberry Group plc is a British luxury fashion house established in 1856 by Thomas Burberry and headquartered in London, England. It designs and distributes ready to wear, including trench coats, leather accessories, and footwear. It is listed on the London Stock Exchange and is a constituent of the FTSE 100 Index.

== History ==
=== Early years ===
==== 19th century ====
Burberry was founded in 1856 when 21-year-old Thomas Burberry, a former draper's apprentice, opened his own store in Basingstoke, Hampshire, England. By 1870, the business had established itself by focusing on the development of outdoors attire. In 1879, Burberry introduced gabardine to his brand, a hardwearing, water-resistant yet breathable fabric, in which the yarn is waterproofed before weaving. In 1891, Burberry opened a shop in the Haymarket, London.

==== 20th century ====
Burberry check

In 1901, the Burberry Equestrian Knight logo was developed containing the Latin word "Prorsum", meaning "forwards", and it was registered as a trademark in 1909. In 1911, the company became the outfitters for Roald Amundsen, the first man to reach the South Pole, and Ernest Shackleton, who led a 1914 expedition to cross Antarctica. A Burberry gabardine jacket was worn by George Mallory on his attempt on Mount Everest in 1924.

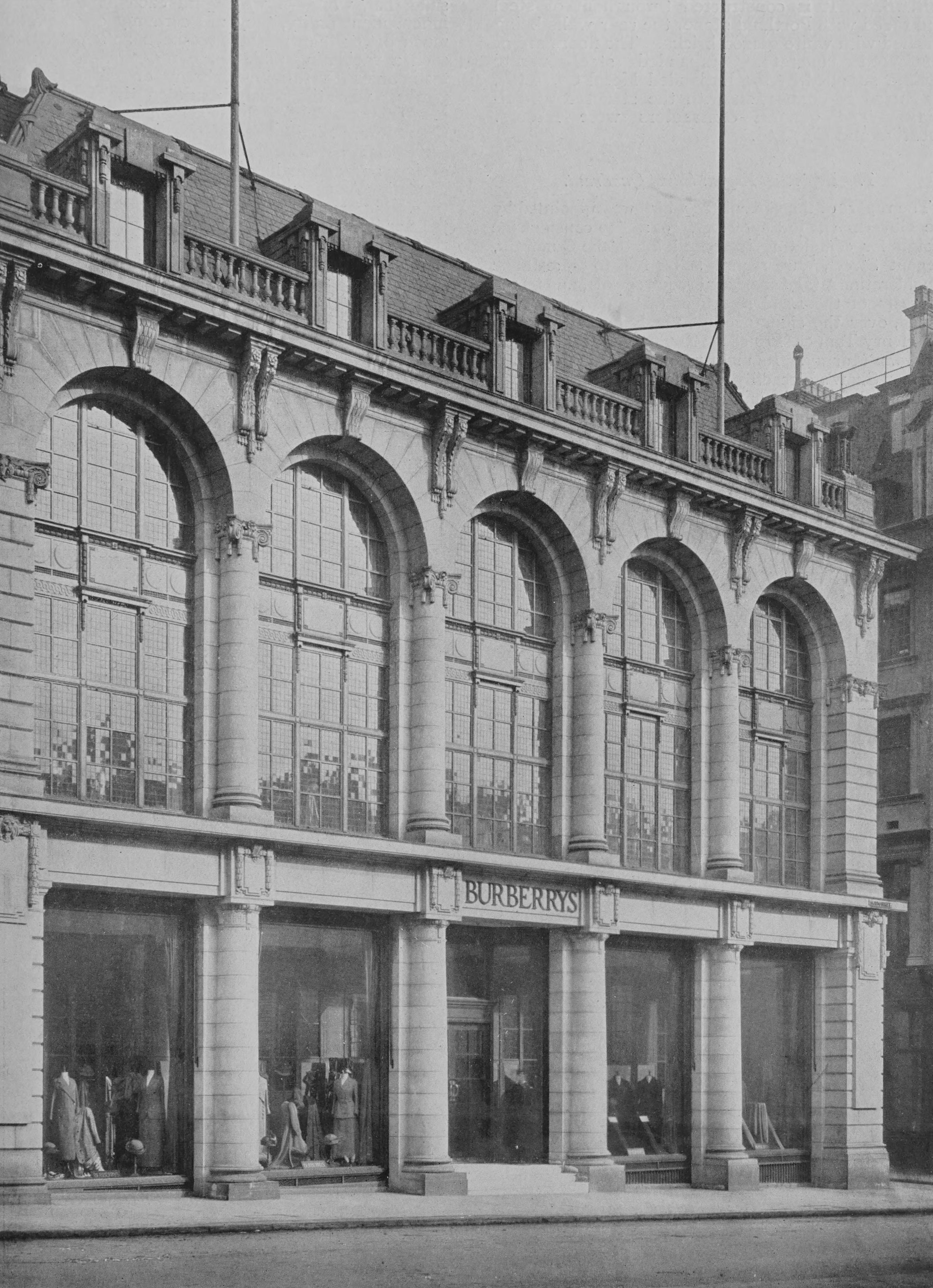
The former headquarters on Haymarket, built in 1913 and designed by Walter Cave

Adapted to meet the needs of military personnel, the "trench coat" was born during the First World War; it was worn by British officers in the trenches. After the war, it became popular with civilians.

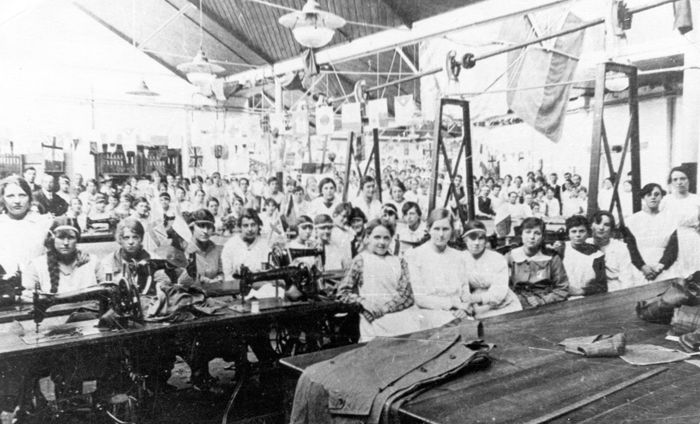
A Burberry factory in Basingstoke producing trench coats, 1918

The Burberry check has been in use since at least the 1920s, primarily as a lining in its trench coats. The celebrity motorcycling sisters Betty and Nancy Debenham wore their trench coats for travelling and racing in the 1920s and recommended the garment in their 1928 book Motor-Cycling for Women. Burberry also specially designed aviation garments. They outfitted Mrs Victor Bruce for her 1930 round the world flight and her one woman flight to Japan. She wore a reversible coat with waterproof gabardine outside for flying and with a tweed inner side which could be turned outside to create a smart look for disembarking under the glare of the publicity her exploits attracted. In 1937, A. E. Clouston and Betty Kirby-Green broke the world record for the fastest return flight from London to Cape Town in The Burberry airplane that was sponsored by the brand. Burberry was an independent family-controlled company until 1955, when Great Universal Stores (GUS) assumed ownership.

==== Influences and rise to prominence ====
Queen Elizabeth II meeting and shaking hands with Stanley Thomas Peacock (Managing Director) and William Stanley Peacock (Chairman, prior to Leonard Wolfson) at IMBEX, 1960s

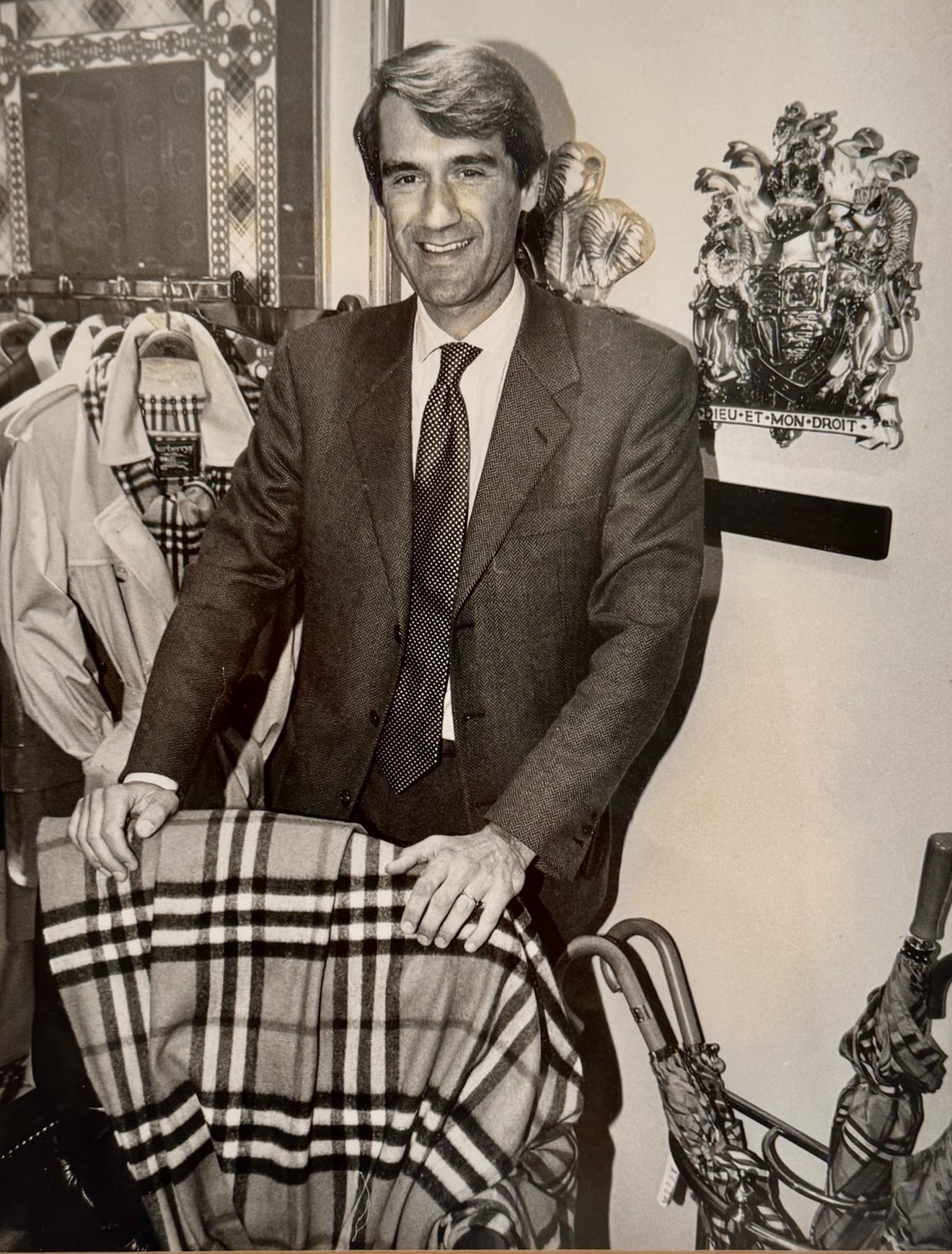
John William Peacock - Director Burberry Continental Europe, 1994

During the 1970s, Burberry signed agreements with worldwide manufacturers such as Mitsui to produce goods complementary to the existing British collection.

The company had signed Lord Lichfield as photographer, Lord (Leonard) Wolfson was Chairman and Stanley Peacock OBE Managing Director. Under this leadership, Burberry pursued expansion into key geographies, notably Asia and Europe. Growth during this period was driven primarily through initial licensing agreements in both regions, which extended the brand’s reach and diversified its foreign distribution. This initiative included the broader development of Burberry’s operations in continental Europe, led by John William Peacock until 1998.

Trading conducted under licensing arrangements – such as those in Japan and Spain – were not previously consolidated into Burberry's parent company accounts, as is standard accounting practice, until the company began reclaiming control. Nevertheless, these agreements contributed significantly to Burberry’s financial performance. For example, Burberry’s license holder in Japan was generating sales valued at about €435 million.

In 1997, GUS director Victor Barnett became chairman of Burberry, hiring Rose Marie Bravo to execute a corporate reorganization and restoration of the brand as a luxury fashion house. Barnett led the company up to its successful IPO in 2001.

=== 21st century ===
In May 2001, Christopher Bailey joined Burberry as creative director. Bailey was the chief creative officer from 2014, as well as chief executive (CEO) from 2014 until November 2017. Bailey stepped down as chief creative officer in March 2018 and had departed the brand completely by the end of 2018.

Between 2001 and 2005, Burberry became associated with "chav" and football hooligan/casual culture. This change in the brand reputation was attributed to lower priced products, the proliferation of counterfeit goods adopting Burberry's trademark check pattern, and adoption by celebrities prominently identified with "chav" culture. The association with football hooliganism led to the wearing of Burberry check garments being banned at some venues.

Burberry Group plc was initially floated on the London Stock Exchange in July 2002. GUS divested its remaining interest in Burberry in December 2005. In 2005, Sanyo-shokai was the Burberry ready-to-wear licence holder in Japan, with retail value of €435 million.

In 2006, Rose Marie Bravo CEO, retired. She was replaced by another American, Angela Ahrendts, who joined from Liz Claiborne in January 2006, and took up the position of CEO on 1 July 2006. Ahrendts and Bailey successfully turned around the then chav-like reputation that the brand had acquired at the end of Bravo's tenure and the cheapening effect of the brand's omnipresence, by removing the brand's check-pattern from all but 10% of the company's products, taking the fragrance and beauty product licenses back in-house and buying out the Spanish franchise that was worth 20% of group revenues. Burberry first sold online in the US, then in the UK in October 2006, and in the rest of the EU in 2007.

=== 2010s ===
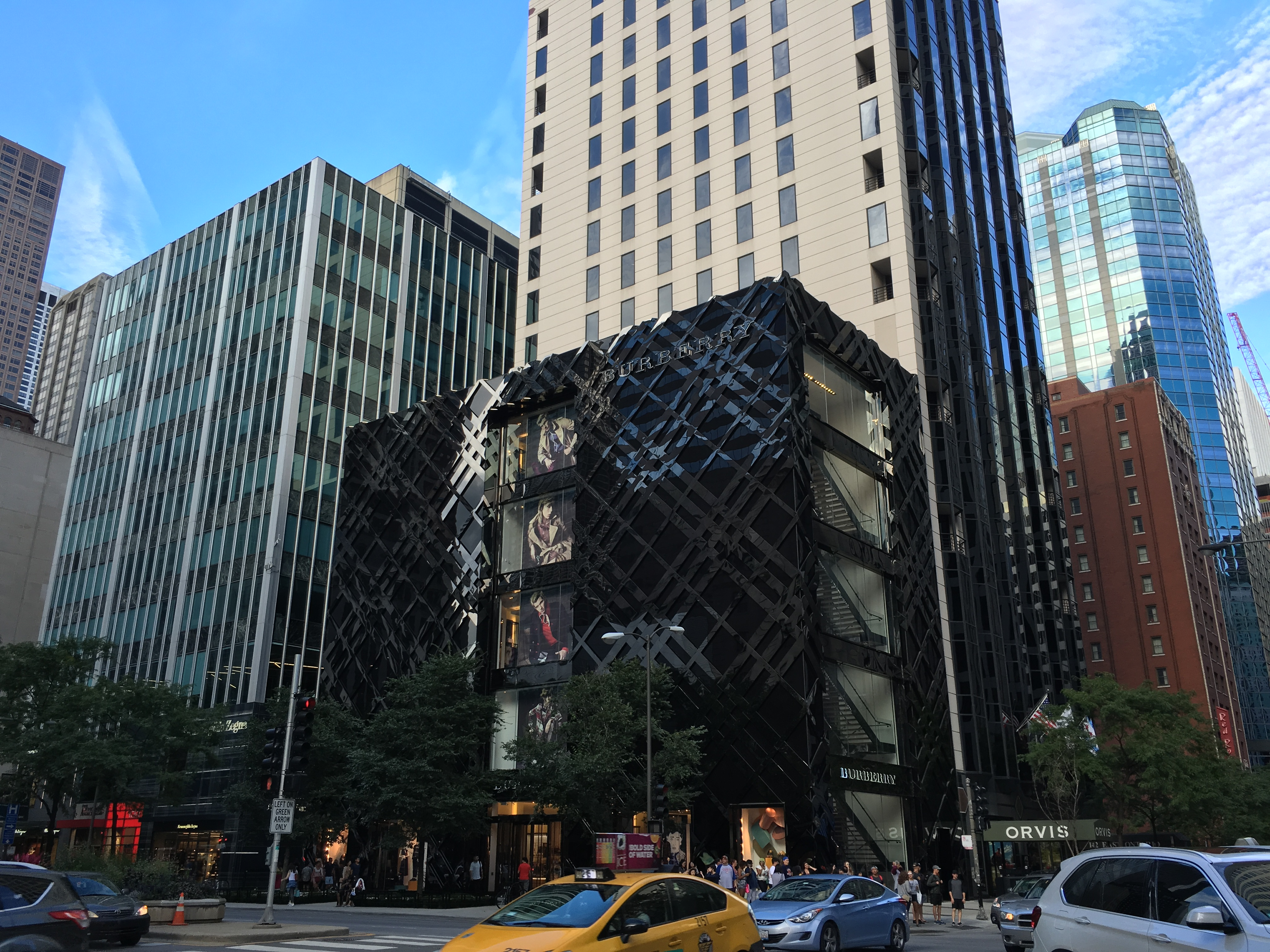
Burberry Chicago flagship store on the Magnificent Mile, built in 2012

It was reported in 2012 that Ahrendts was the highest paid CEO in the UK, making £16.9 million.

In October 2013, it was announced that Ahrendts would take up the position of Senior Vice President of retail and online at Apple, Inc. from April 2014, and would be replaced as CEO by Bailey. During her tenure, sales increased to over £2 billion, and the market capitalization more than tripled to £7 billion. Burberry promotes its British origins; as of July 2012, Burberry maintained two production facilities in Great Britain, one in Castleford producing raincoats, and one in Keighley. In spring 2014, Bailey became CEO of Burberry and retained the role of chief creative officer. His basic salary was £1.1 million, with total compensation of up to £10 million a year depending on sales targets being met.

In July 2016, it was announced that Celine boss Marco Gobbetti would become CEO of Burberry plc, while Bailey became the Creative Director with the title of President. In 2016, the label launched its "Mr Burberry" fragrance.

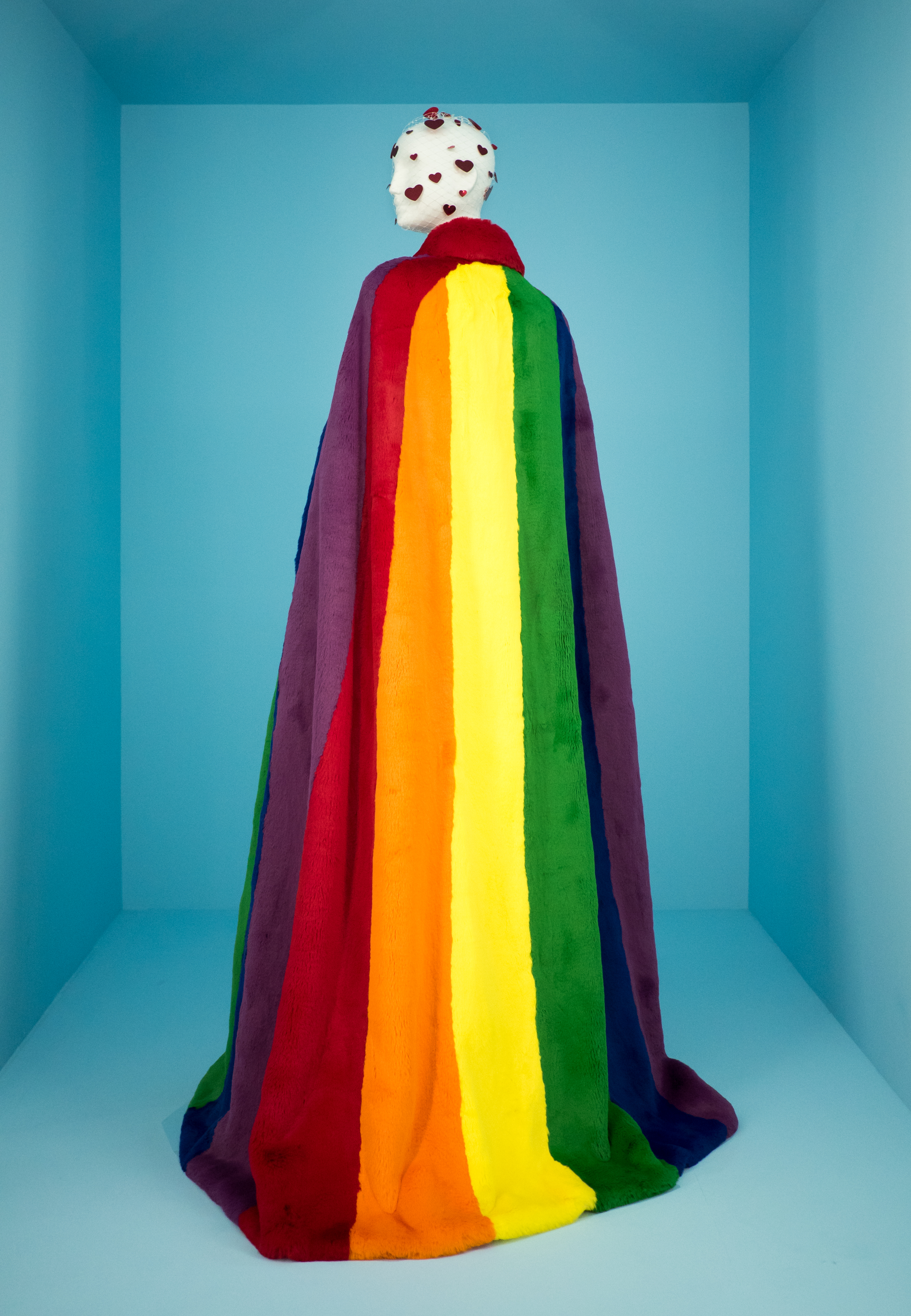
Cape by Bailey at The Met's exhibit, Camp: Notes on Fashion

In early May 2017, the store announced it was moving 300 employees from London to Leeds. In July 2017, Gobbetti replaced Bailey as CEO. In March 2018, Burberry named Riccardo Tisci, creative director at Givenchy from 2005 to 2017, as the brand's chief creative officer. He said: "I am honoured and delighted to be joining Burberry as its new chief creative officer and reuniting with Marco Gobbetti. I have an enormous respect for Burberry's British heritage and global appeal and I am excited about the potential of this exceptional brand."

A few months later, Tisci presented a new logo and monogram for the brand, designed by the English graphic designer Peter Saville.

In April 2018, it was announced that John Peace would be stepping down as chairman of the board and would be replaced by as chairman by Gerry Murphy. Murphy said: "Burberry is a unique British brand that I have admired for a long time and I am looking forward to working with Marco Gobbetti and the Board to guide the company through its next phase of growth."

Murphy had been CEO of Kingfisher plc, as well as being current chairman of Tate and Lyle and Blackstone Group International Partners LLP. Peace's departure marked a change in leadership for the group, with Gobetti and Ahrends having left in the previous years.

In May 2018, it was reported that Burberry had filed a lawsuit against Target Corporation, claiming that Target had copied its check print designs and was seeking an amount of US$2 million, in addition to its legal costs.

In July 2018, it was reported that in the previous five years Burberry had destroyed unsold clothes, accessories, and perfume worth over £90 million in order to protect its brand and prevent the items being stolen or sold cheaply. While a representative of Greenpeace criticised the decision, Burberry claimed that the energy generated from burning its products was captured, making it environmentally friendly. According to Burberry's annual report, by the end of the financial year 2018, the company had destroyed goods worth £28.6 million, an increase on the £26.9 million from its financial year 2017. In September 2018, Burberry reported that it would stop the practice of burning unsold goods, with immediate effect. Burberry also announced it would stop using real fur in its products, and would phase out existing fur items.

In February 2019, Burberry apologized for showcasing a hoodie with a noose around the neck in its show at the London Fashion Week. Burberry said it had removed the item from its collection, after criticism from one of its own models led to an online backlash.

=== 2020s ===
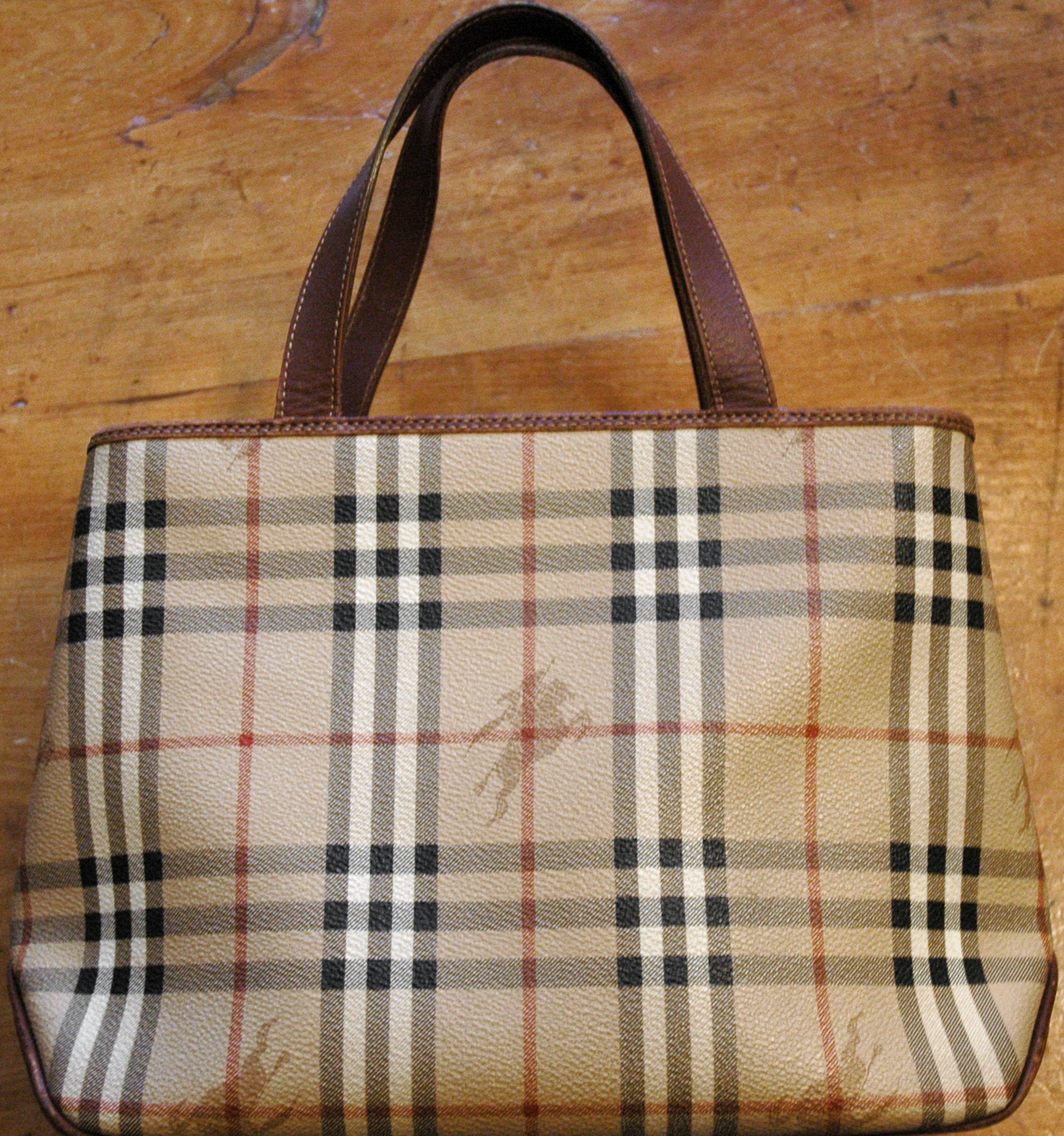
Burberry handbag, with its iconic check

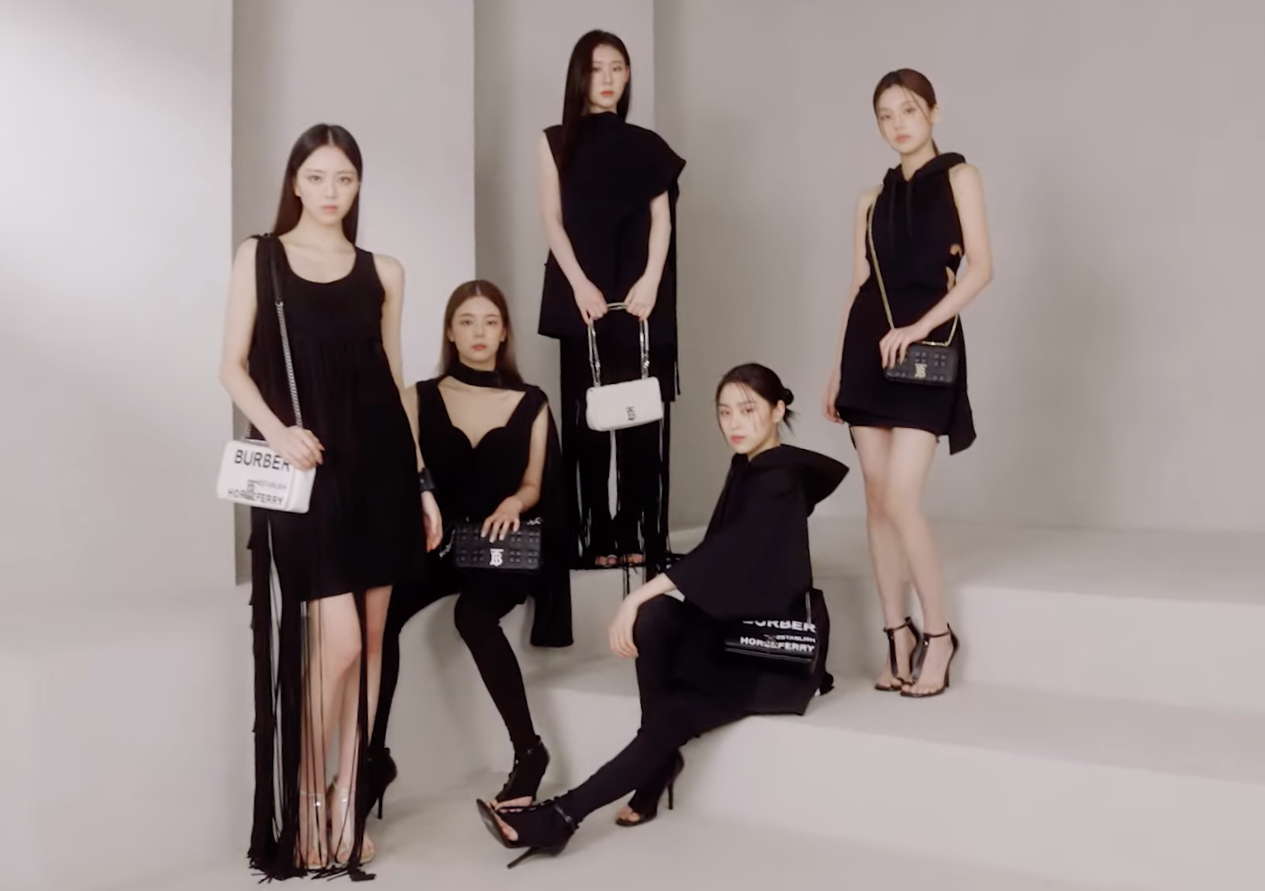
Burberry campaign with Itzy pop group, 2022

In February 2020 Burberry was forced to close 24 of its 64 mainland Chinese stores because of the COVID-19 pandemic. By July 2020, the company announced it would cut 500 jobs worldwide, including 150 in its UK head offices, in an effort to save £55 million following a reduction in sales due to the COVID-19 pandemic. In 2021, Burberry announced that it would become a "climate positive" company by 2040. The fashion brand also announced that it would commit to a new target to reduce supply chain emissions (i.e. assets not owned or controlled by the reporting organisation) by 46% by 2030, an increase from an earlier pledge of a 30% reduction. In March 2021, Burberry was the first luxury brand to be targeted in China as part of the backlash regarding sanctions against the alleged human rights abuses in Xinjiang. Brand ambassador and actress Zhou Dongyu terminated her contract with Burberry.

In April 2022, after the departure of Marco Gobbetti, the Versace boss Jonathan Akeroyd took over Burberry as the next chief executive in a deal including a £6 million golden hello to cover the loss of bonus and share awards for leaving his previous position.

In July 2022, Burberry announced Thai artist Vachirawit Chivaaree as their first Global Brand Ambassador from the South Asia-Pacific Region.

Later in 2022, the company's chief operating and financial officer announced a ban on the use of exotic skins, such as alligator and snake, in its collections. In September 2022, Burberry announced designer Daniel Lee, former creative director of Bottega Veneta, as Riccardo Tisci's replacement as the company's chief creative officer.

In February 2023 a new logo and branding was introduced: this brought back the Equestrian Knight logo. The advertising campaign features British models and musicians Shygirl, Liberty Ross and Skepta.

In April 2023, rapper Kano fronted a Burberry marketing campaign introduced by Lee in February 2023. The new direction was phrased as "a modern take on British luxury".

In October 2023, Burberry collaborated with Vestiaire Collective on a new circular style project. This partnership would allow customers to exchange their second-hand Burberry clothing and handbags for a Burberry gift card, which they could reinvest in the brand, with the aim of promoting resale and reducing clothing waste.

Research by the social democratic party in the European Parliament, the Sheffield Hallam University and other groups accused Burberry in 2023 of using Uyghur forced labour camps provided by the Sunrise Manufacture Group Co. for production of clothing.

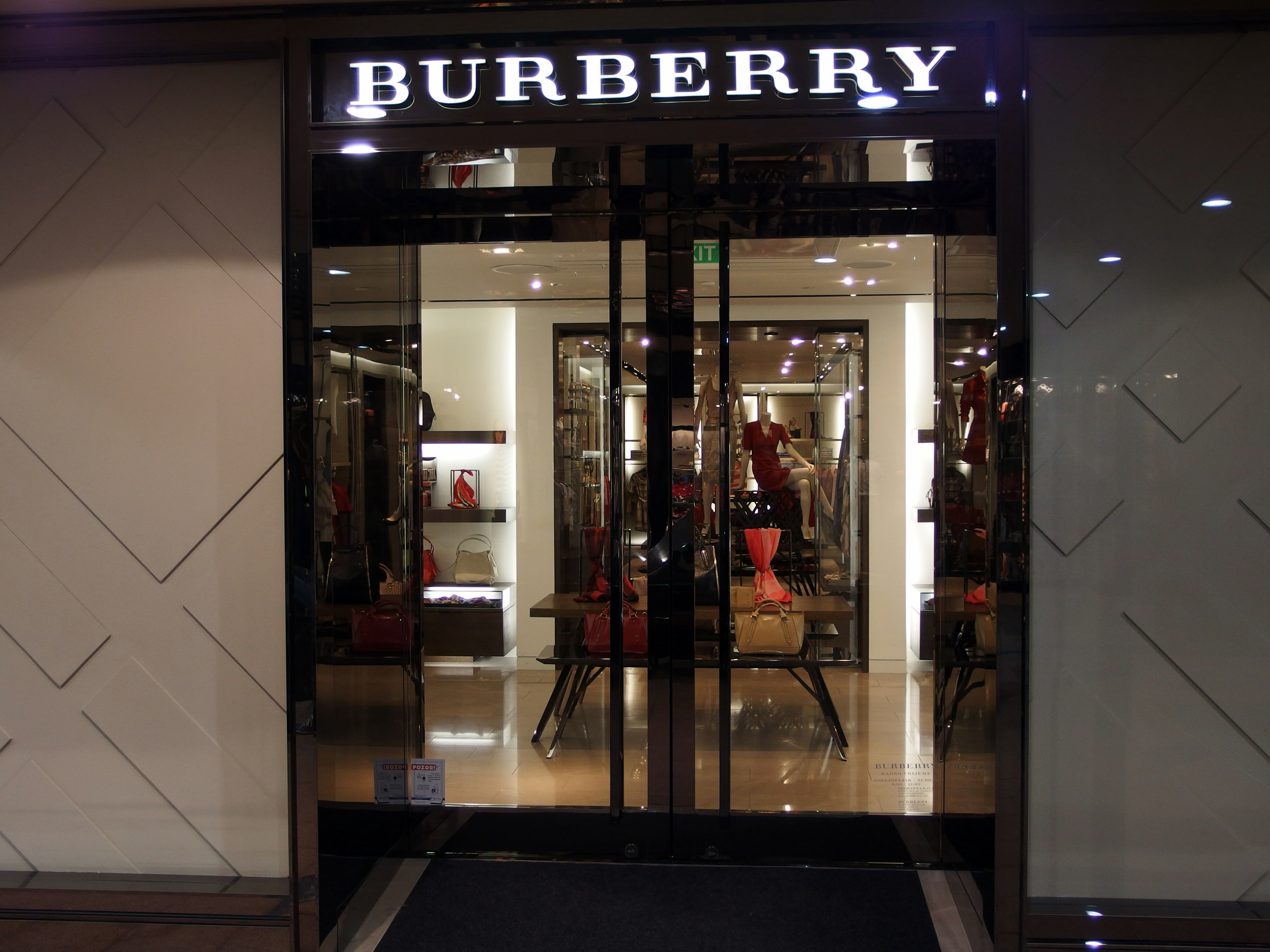
Burberry store in Zagreb

In July 2024, the company announced a profit warning and the departure of its chief executive Jonathan Akeroyd, to be replaced by Joshua Schulman. The company also reported significant sales declines across its markets in the first quarter, with store sales dropping 23% in the Americas and Asia Pacific, and 16% in Europe, the Middle East, India and Africa. The company's shares fell 15% following the announcement, and it suspended dividend payments. Burberry also revealed plans for job cuts, primarily in its UK corporate office.

In November 2024, Burberry launched a £40 million cost-cutting program, aiming to stabilize the brand and refocus on its core outerwear and trench coats. As part of the turnaround, Burberry planned to cut £40 million annually, with £25 million expected in the 2025 financial year. Though the company refrained from specifying job cuts, it confirmed it was streamlining office staff. Schulman also introduced a new outerwear campaign and appointed new managers in key divisions. Burberry's shares rose 16% following the announcement.

In May 2025, the company announced plans to reduce the number of employees by up to 1,700. The reduction is part of wider plans to reduce costs of £60 million by the end of 2027. According to the March 2026 earnings report, the company closed 21 stores while opening nine locations, to end the fiscal year of 2026 with 410 stores globally. These reductions were made to cut costs due to weakening demand and economic pressure.

== In popular culture ==
Music has been integral to the Burberry story since Christopher Bailey's tenure as Chief Creative Officer when he established Burberry Acoustic, a platform championing emerging musicians and showcasing his love for music.

On 30 November 2022, in an episode of All Elite Wrestling's (AEW) Dynamite, the reigning champion Maxwell Jacob Friedman ('MJF'), who had won the title at Full Gear on 19 November, discarded the standard AEW World Championship belt, calling it trash, and unveiled his own custom version, which he dubbed the "Big Burberry Belt", or Triple-B for short. It featured the exact same design as the standard belt; however, the leather strap was brown and fashioned in Burberry's trademark check pattern to match MJF's signature Burberry scarf.

On 29 March 2023, a Burberry tote was used in an episode from Succession. Google searches for Burberry and the "Burberry tote bag" rose by more than 310% after the episode aired.

== Logos ==
1999–2018

1999–2018

2018–2023

2018–2023

since 2023

since 2023 (coloured)

since 2023
