= Marco Gobbetti =

Italian businessman

- Born: 1 March 1960 (age 66)
- Education: American University; Thunderbird School of Global Management
- Occupation: Business executive
- Title: CEO, Salvatore Ferragamo
- Term: 2021–

Marco Gobbetti (born 1 March 1960) is an Italian businessman, and the CEO of Salvatore Ferragamo. Before this, he succeeded Christopher Bailey in July 2017 as CEO of Burberry. Starting his career in management at luxury companies such as Bottega Veneta, Valextra, and Moschino, and became CEO of Givenchy in 2004 and was the chairman and the CEO of Céline.

== Early life and education ==
Gobbetti was born in 1958, and is Italian. He has a degree in business administration from the American University in Washington, D.C., and a master's degree in international management from the Thunderbird School of Global Management in Phoenix, Arizona.

== Career ==
=== 1984–1992 ===
From 1984 to 1989, Gobbetti worked with the Italian luxury label Bottega Veneta as a commercial director. First a sales director for Bottega Veneta in the United States, he then became a marketing and sales director. In 1989 he then joined Valextra as managing director.

=== 1993–2016 ===
He was chief executive of Moschino from 1993 to 2004, and then was appointed chief executive of Givenchy in February 2004, which is owned by LVMH. Gobbetti became Céline's chief executive in 2008 working with creative director Phoebe Philo. Under Gobbetti, the company moved its headquarters and revamped its product offerings to focus on "clean and sophisticated" lines. As of 2016, he remained the chairman and CEO of Céline.

In July 2016, it was announced that Gobbetti would replace Christopher Bailey as the CEO of Burberry, with Bailey remaining with the company as president and chief creative officer. Gobetti took on the role of executive chairman, Asia Pacific and Middle East, in January 2017. The position was created for Gobetti to familiarize himself with the company. He became CEO and joined the board in July 2017. Having left Burberry in 2021, he joined Italian fashion brand Salvatore Ferragamo as CEO as of January 1, 2022. In March 2022 he appointed Maximilian Davis as the brand's creative director.
