= Ben King =

Ben or Benjamin King may refer to:

- Ben E. King (1938–2015), American singer
- Ben King (guitarist) (born 1984), British-American lead guitarist with the Yardbirds
- Benjamin Franklin King Jr. (1857–1894), American poet and parodist
- Benjamin King (actor) (born 1971), American actor
- Benjamin King Jr. (1890–1956), American politician from Mississippi
- Benjamin H. King (1919–2004), United States Air Force general and flying ace
- Ben Tavera King (born 1952), American new age musician
- Ben King (cyclist) (born 1989), American road racing cyclist
- Ben King (designer), American fashion designer of the 1940s–70s
- Ben King (producer), New Zealand based music producer
- Ben King, American aviator, see 1936 in aviation
- Benjamin King, Australian road racing cyclist, see Australian National Time Trial Championships
- Benjamin King (author) (born 1944), American author and military historian
- Ben King (footballer) (born 2000), Australian rules football player
- Ben King, a fictional doctor on New Zealand soap opera/medical drama, Shortland Street
