= The Wishing-Table, the Gold-Ass, and the Cudgel in the Sack =

German fairy tale

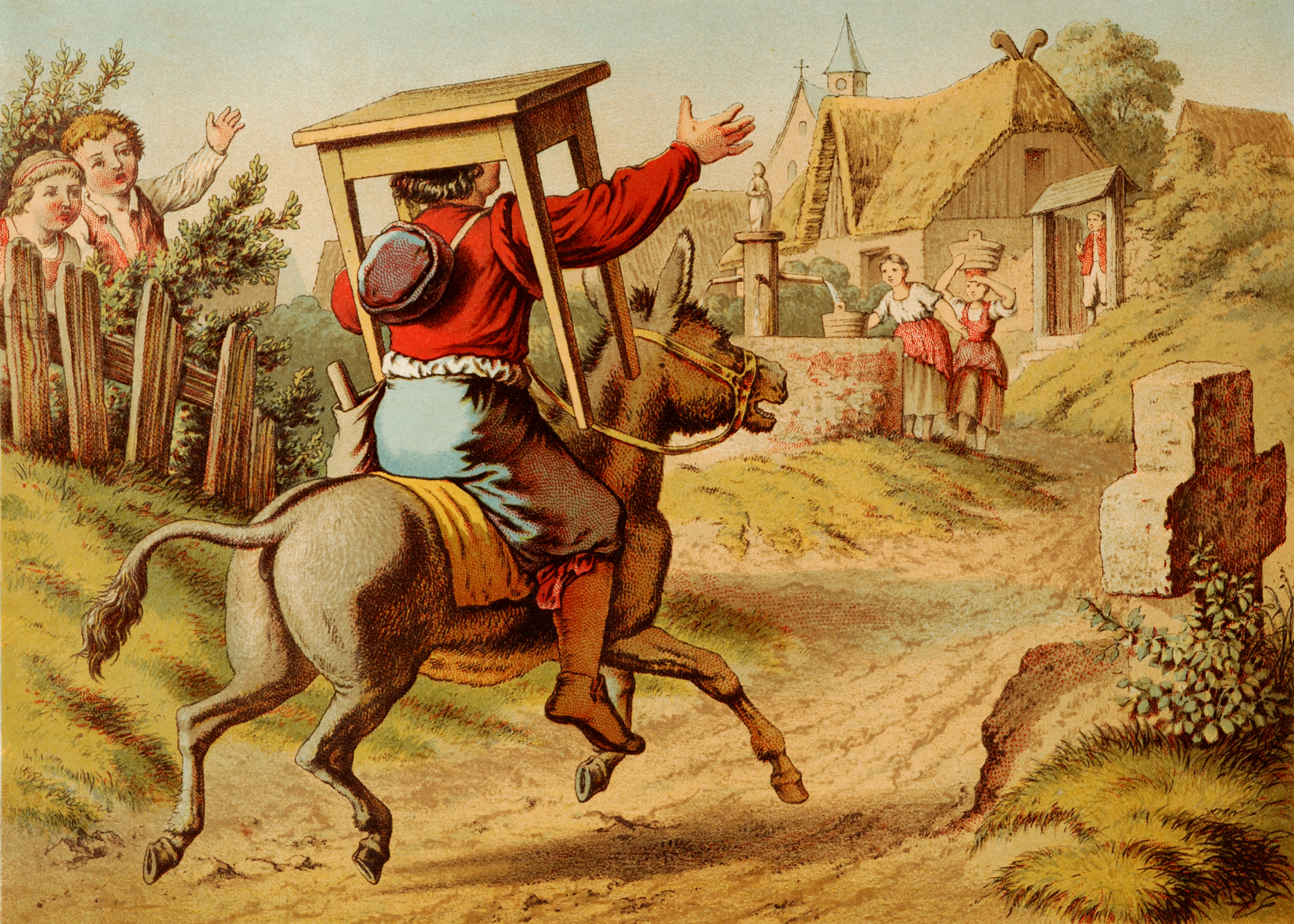
- The youngest brother returns home with the table, the donkey and the stick. Illustration from a late 19th century fairy tale book.

Folk tale
- Name: The Wishing-Table, the Gold-Ass, and the Cudgel in the Sack
- Aarne–Thompson grouping: ATU 563 (The Table, the Ass, and the Stick), 212 (The Lying Goat)
- Region: Germany
- Published in: Grimm Fairy Tales by the Brothers Grimm

"The Wishing-Table, the Gold-Ass, and the Cudgel in the Sack" is a fairytale by the Brothers Grimm. The original German name is Tischlein deck dich, Goldesel und Knüppel aus dem Sack.

The tale is classified in the Aarne-Thompson-Uther Index as tale type ATU 563, "The Table, the Ass, and the Stick", as well as 212, "The Lying Goat".

== Plot ==
A tailor had three sons who were all fed by the milk of their goat. The oldest son was given the task to let the animal graze at the finest grass fields. At the end of the day the son asked the goat whether it had eaten enough and the animal confirmed this. However, when they returned home the goat claimed the opposite, causing the tailor to get upset and drive his son out of the house. This pattern repeats itself with the second oldest and youngest son too, who are also falsely blamed by the goat for not feeding it enough and as a result are kicked out of the house as well. Only when the father goes out to feed the goat himself and discovers that the creature still claims it hasn't eaten enough does he realize he misjudged his sons. He takes his razor, shaves the goat bare and uses his whip to drive it out of his house. The tailor is left alone in his house longing for his sons' return.

The story then follows each son individually. The first one went to a maker of furniture and learned the craft. After his service his master gave him a magic table as a sign of gratitude. Whenever he says "Table, Deck Yourself" the table decks itself with the finest food and wine. The son decides to travel home and show his father what he learned and earned. On his way he visits a local inn, where he demonstrates the powers of the magic table. At night the inn keeper steals the table and switches it for a normal table, without the son being aware. When the son arrives home and tries to show the powers of the table to his father nothing happens, which upsets his father.

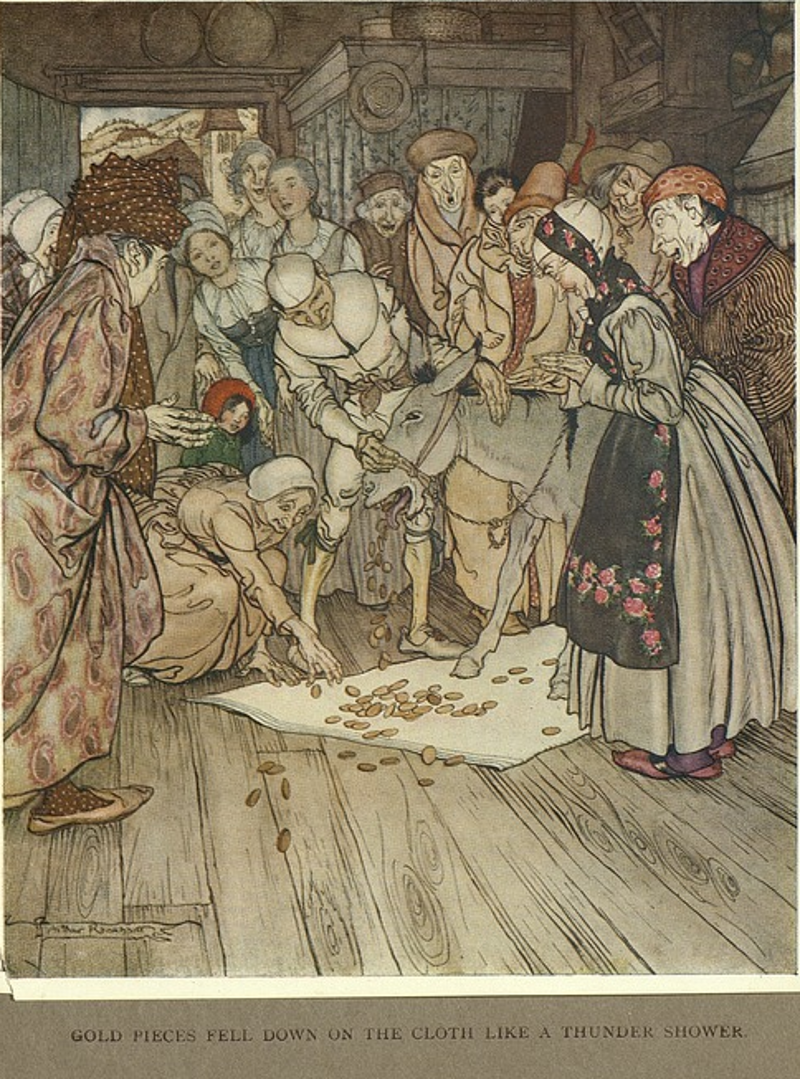
Arthur Rackham, 1917

The second son goes to work for a miller. His master gives him a magical ass who is able to produce gold out of its mouth and behind at the command of "Bricklebrit!" Just like the oldest son, the second son decides to travel home and happens to visit the same inn his brother did. He too demonstrates the powers of the ass to the innkeeper who once again steals the animal at night and replaces it with a normal ass, without the son being aware of what happened. When the son arrives home and tries to show the powers of the ass instead of gold pieces landing on the cloth, it is droppings like an ordinary donkey, which upsets his father once again.

The third son went to work for a woodturner and is given a magic cudgel in a bag. Whenever someone is injust, the owner of the cudgel just needs to say: "Cudgel, out the sack!" and the object will start clobbering the wrongdoer. Only when the owner says: "Cudgel in the sack!" will the thing return in the bag. Just like his brothers, the son visits the same inn, because he learned from their letters what had happened. Instead of demonstrating the powers of his possession he deliberately remains vague about it, making the inn keeper curious enough to go out at night and try to look what's in the bag. Anticipating this, the son orders the cudgel to beat the inn keeper up until he returns everything he has stolen. When the son returns home with the table, donkey and cudgel he tells his father what had happened and demonstrates the powers of the objects. His father finally makes peace with his sons and they all live a rich life ever after.

As an epilogue, the story also informs the reader what happened to the goat. The shaven animal went to hide inside a fox hole. When the fox returned home it was scared away by the goat's eyes. The fox asks a bear for help, but he is also too frightened to go in. Finally they take a bee along with them, who stings the goat, causing the animal to run away in pain. The storyteller concludes that nobody knows where she is now.

== Analysis ==
=== Origins ===
Stith Thompson indicated that the oldest attestation of the tale was a collection of Chinese Buddhistic legends of the 6th century.

=== Distribution ===
Scholar Stith Thompson noted that the tale type "has a very extensive distribution", being "present in almost every collection of stories in Europe and Asia". Professor Theo Meder's study corroborates this vast distribution, since, according to him, the tale type can also be found "in India and in East Asia, in Africa and in the Middle East", as well as in the Americas.

Professor Dov Noy cited that variants in the Americas are found in the French, English and Spanish traditions of the continent.

An assessment on a global scale of international tale indexes, by Daniel J. Crowley, let him conclude that the tale type appears "among the most popular and widespread tales on Earth".

The second plot involved, "The Lying Goat", is common throughout Europe, with dozens of variants recorded. Sometimes, it ends with the goat killing the owner. The final part, of attempts to banish the animal, is itself told as a separate tale (ATU 43) in both Europe and Africa, involving a variety of animals (a Russian variant, with a fox and a hare, was adapted into a cartoon (Лиса и заяц, 1973) by Yuri Norstein).

=== Variants ===
In several variants across the globe, the money-producing donkey generated precious gems instead of gold coins. Likewise, the wealth-producing animal may differ, being, for instance, a rooster, a duck, a horse or a sheep. The food-giving object may also differ: it can be a tablecloth, a towel or a handkerchief.

Czech author Václav Tille (writing under pseudonym Václav Říha) published a similar tale, titled Ubrousku, prostři se: the protagonist receives a lamb that produces money, a handkerchief that materializes food and a magical cane.

Italo Calvino's Italian Folktales contains a variant called The North Wind's Gift (Il regalo del vento tramontano), where a starving farmer named Geppone goes to the North Wind that destroys his crops, and receives a box producing food. It is taken from him by the local prior for a price the latter refuses to pay. When Geppone goes to beg the Wind again, he receives a golden box which only works for a starving person, and which turns out to produce thugs with clubs. With pretended reluctance, Geppone agrees to trade the box for the old one. Then he waits until the prior attempts to use it at a banquet for which a lot of important clergy members are invited, and once both the prior and his guests are thoroughly beaten up, retrieves the second one as well.

In an English tale from "North-country", Jack's Luck, or The Ass, the Table and the Stick, poor youth Jack works for an old lady and receives a donkey that produces silver and gold, and for a carpenter who gives him the self-setting table. On a third occasion, after a strange man helps Jack from drowning, the youth helps him build a bridge to cross the river and the man carves the magic stick out of a branch. Jack uses the stick to regain the donkey and the table. Finally, he becomes the richest man in his home village and invites all single maidens to choose his future bride. He declares the girl must appear with their dowry in their aprons. Soon, all maidens appear with "heaps of gold and silver coins", except for one girl - Jack's "one true love" - who shows up with only "two copper pennies and a crooked sixpence" that Jack gave her when he was still a poor lad. He sets her aside, to the jeers of the other candidates, and she begins to cry, her tears becoming diamonds. Jack then sics the magic stick on the other girls to expel them and marries his beloved. The tale was also published by author Flora Annie Steel in English Fairy Tales, with the title The Ass, the Table and the Stick. A very similar version, The Ass, the Table, and the Stick, was given by folklorist Joseph Jacobs in his English Fairy Tales.

In a Portuguese variant, "A Cacheira," the protagonist is a poor old woman who climbs a beanstalk to heaven. St. Peter gives her a table that conjures food, a lamb that pees money, and a cudgel that beats people.

In an Albanian tale titled Vultrupçja, a man lives with his wife and their beautiful daughter, and earns his living by cutting and selling firewood. One day, he goes to cut firewood when a large snake appears to him and demands his daughter, lest the snake devours him. The man sells the firewood he collected, and returns home in a worried state. His daughter notices her father's sour mood and he tells them about the snake. Since he earns their living by cutting and selling wood, they decide to venture in another forest to escape the snake. The following morning, the man rides his donkey to the second forest, and still the same snake appears to him to remind him of his threat, which he promises to make true no matter where the man hides. Defeated, the man brings his wife and daughter the next day and they meet the large snake. The reptile bids them follow him to a large cave, which is his lair filled with his riches. The snake then gives the man and the woman a gift to alleviate their poverty: a magic table that becomes full of food when the man utters "Durdull". The man thanks the snake and goes back home. The woman tells the neighbours that their son-in-law have them a magic table, to his brother's envy. The man's brother and his wife conspire to steal the magic table, fashion a facsimile and replace the original for the false one. The man goes to use the table, but it does not produce any food, so he goes to complain to the snake son-in-law. The snake gives the man a second gift: a donkey that produced money. The man returns home with the gold-producing donkey, which is stolen by his relatives, who replace it for one that produces excrement instead. The old man complains to his wife they were deceived again, and returns to their daughter's snake husband for a solution. The snake son-in-law gives them a magic club that activates by uttering the command "vultrupçe", and the club will beat anyone its master orders it to. The old man uses the magic club on his relatives to regain the table and the donkey.

== In popular culture ==
The table (since 1999), donkey (since 1956) and cudgel (since 1963) are exhibited in the Dutch theme park De Efteling.

A Hungarian variant of the tale was adapted into an episode of the Hungarian television series Magyar népmesék ("Hungarian Folk Tales") (hu), with the title A szegény csizmadia és a szélkirály ("The Poor Cobbler and the King of Winds"). In this version, the poor man visits the King of the Winds and obtains a lamb that produces money on command, a magic tablecloth and a beating cane.

In Linderhof Palace, the dining room has a 'magic table' which lowers through a trapdoor into the room below. A duplicate ready-set table then rises in its place.

== See also ==
- Donkeyskin
- The Goose That Laid the Golden Eggs
