= Ben Zuckerman =

Romanian-born American fashion designer

- Born: July 29, 1890; Kingdom of Romania
- Died: August 9, 1979 (aged 89); Palm Beach, Florida, U.S.
- Citizenship: United States
- Partner: Harry Schacter
- Awards: 1951 Neiman Marcus Fashion Award; 1952, 1957 and 1961 Coty Awards

Ben Zuckerman (July 29, 1890 – August 9, 1979) was a Romanian-born, American fashion designer, known particularly for his high-quality tailored coats and suits. He made clothes for Jacqueline Kennedy while she was First Lady of the United States.

== Early life ==
Ben Zuckerman was born in Romania on 29 July 1890, and immigrated along with his family when he was still a child. The family settled in New Jersey, where Zuckerman left school, aged 15.

== Career ==
The young Zuckerman started out as a floor-sweeper for a dress factory, but built up his skills, until, aged 21, he was able to launch his first business in partnership with Joseph Hoffman. In the late 1920s, the company was succeeded by a new one, Zuckerman & Kraus, which lasted until 1949.

After travelling Europe and touring the United States, Zuckerman came back to New York and launched his eponymous company "Ben Zuckerman" in 1950. His head designer was a former boxer and gas-pump attendant, Harry Shacter, who was also Zuckerman's partner personally as well as professionally. Stanley Marcus recalled that Shacter had a particular knack for going to Paris couture presentations, where sketching was not allowed, and memorising up to fifty looks from the show which he would accurately draw afterwards. This enabled Ben Zuckerman to offer clothing that closely reproduced the latest Paris fashions without having to pay expensive reproduction fees.

Zuckerman, although he could not sew, was known as the "Master Tailor of Seventh Avenue." The quality of his boldly coloured suits and coats was much admired, and very influential on the way American women dressed. His work was described as looking like it had been made by couturiers such as Dior and Balenciaga. Grace Kelly wore one of his coat and dress ensembles in 1956 when she arrived in Monaco to marry Prince Rainier, and proudly wore the same coat nine years later whilst pregnant with her youngest child.

When Jacqueline Kennedy became First Lady of the United States, she consulted with Diana Vreeland to get names of all-American designers who would be appropriately patriotic choices to dress her for her role. After considering the request, particularly Kennedy's request for designers who could reproduce Paris-style elegance, Vreeland recommended Zuckerman alongside Norman Norell, and the sportswear designer Stella Sloat. A purple wool Zuckerman coat closely based on a Pierre Cardin model was originally going to be worn for the Inauguration Day, although Kennedy changed her mind and wore it instead for a tour of the White House with Mamie Eisenhower.

The quality of Zuckerman's clothing was also noted by the poet Marianne Moore, who wrote a short poem about it that was engraved on an award from the Coat and Suit Board in 1963.

Ben Zuckerman retired and closed his business in 1968. In 1973, Zuckerman and Shacter were elected charter members of the Council of Fashion Designers of America.

== Awards ==
Ben Zuckerman won his first Coty Award in 1952, the Return Award in 1957, and the Hall of Fame Award in 1961. He was also a recipient of the Neiman Marcus Fashion Award in 1951, alongside the ceramicist Ernestine Cannon and the ready-to-wear designer Jane Derby.

== Death ==
Zuckerman died at his home in Palm Beach, Florida, on August 9, 1979.
