= Tablecloth =

Cloth used to cover a table

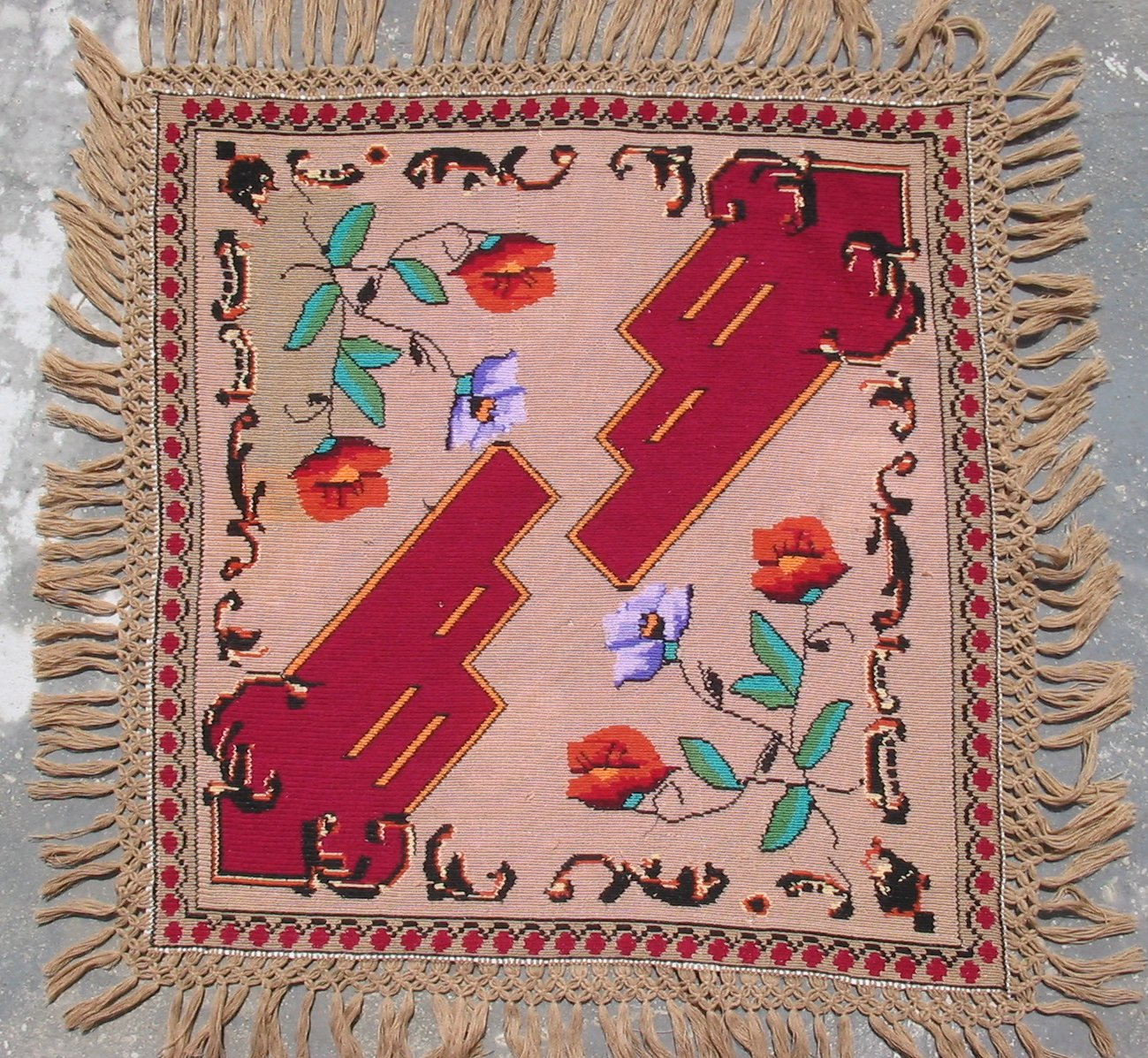
Traditional Romanian tablecloth made in Maramureș

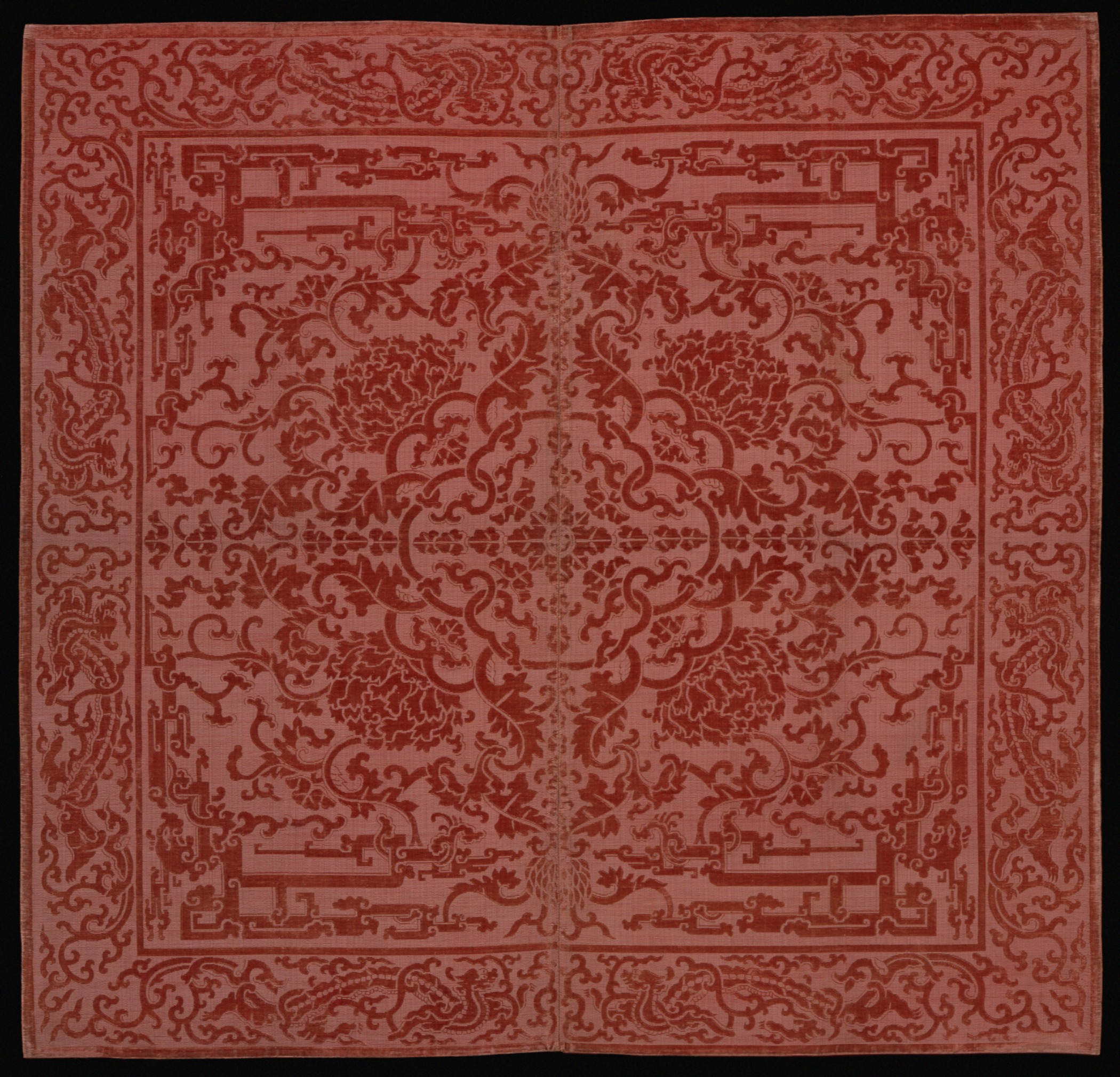
Cover for a square table, Qing dynasty, Qianlong period, 1736–1795, China. Cut and voided silk velvet.

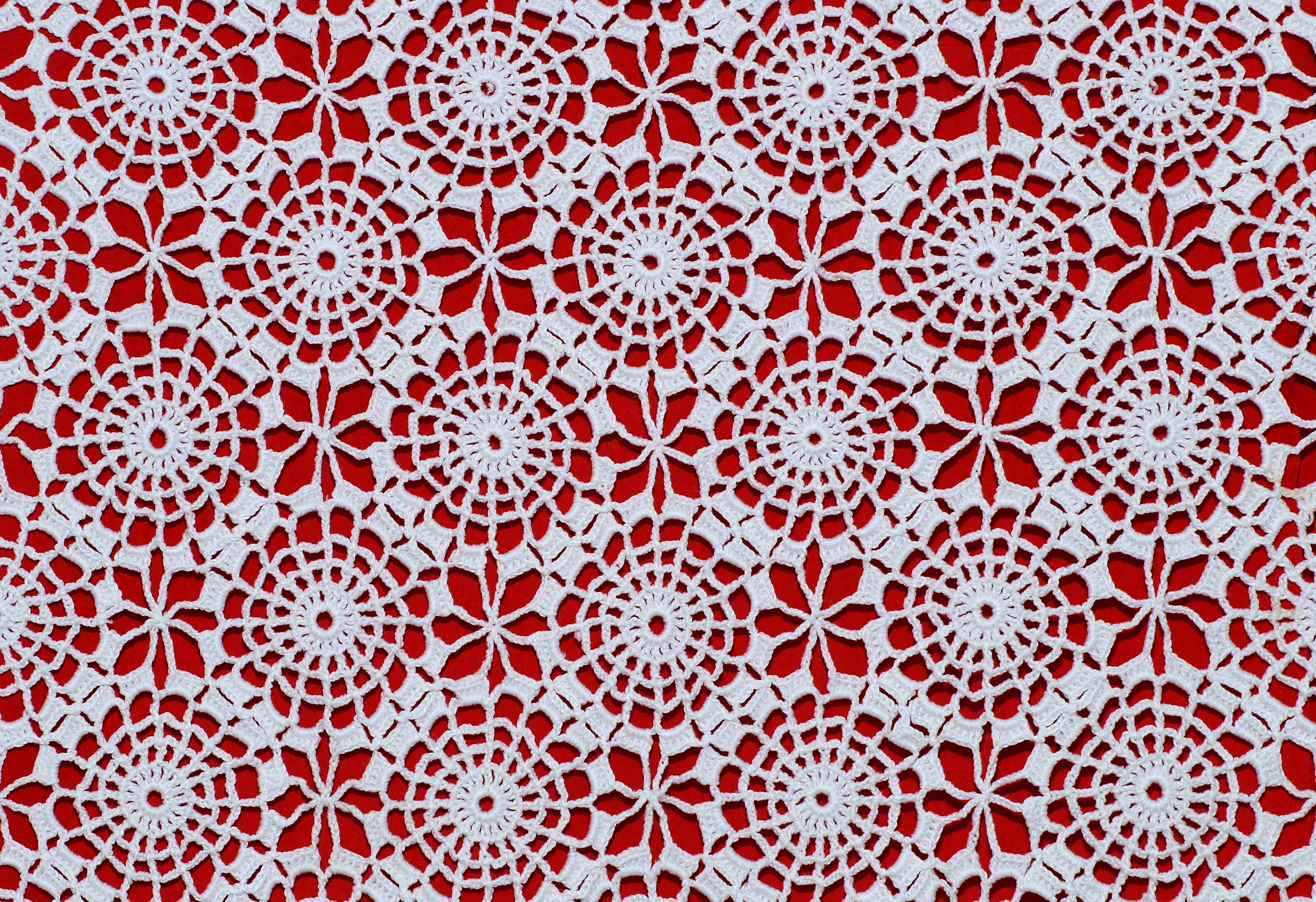
Detail of crochet tablecloth

A tablecloth is a cloth used to cover a table. Some are mainly ornamental coverings, which may also help protect the table from scratches and stains. Other tablecloths are designed to be spread on a dining table before laying out tableware and food. Some tablecloths are designed as part of an overall table setting, with coordinating napkins, placemats, or other decorative pieces. Special kinds of tablecloth include "runners" which overhang the table at two ends only and "table protectors" which provide a padded layer under a normal tablecloth.

== Shapes and sizes ==
The most common shapes for tablecloths are round, square, oval, and oblong, or rectangular, corresponding to the most common table shapes. Tablecloths usually have an overhang, referred to as the "drop." The drop is generally 6 to 15 inches (15 to 38 cm) on each side of the table, with a shorter drop for casual dining and a longer drop for more formal occasions. Sometimes a floor-length cloth is used. Custom-made tablecloths are also available, and some people choose to make their own.

== Fabrics and care ==
Today, dining tablecloths are typically made of Linen, cotton, a poly-cotton blend, or a PVC-coated material that can be wiped clean, but they can be made of almost any material, including delicate fabrics like embroidered silk. Ease of laundering is an important consideration for tablecloths used for dining, as they are easily soiled.

== History ==
The oldest known reference to tablecloth dates back to around 100 AD, when it was mentioned by ancient Latin Spanish poet Martial.

In many European cultures a white, or mainly white, tablecloth used to be the standard covering for a dinner table. In the later medieval period, spreading a high quality white linen or cotton cloth on the table was an important part of preparing for a feast in a wealthy household. Over time, the custom of arranging tableware on a cloth became common for most social classes except the very poorest. As eating habits changed in the 20th century, a much greater range of table-setting styles developed. Some formal dinners still use white tablecloths, often with a damask weave, but other colours and patterns are also common.

== Special cases ==
Perugia tablecloths and napkins have been made since medieval times. These cloths are white with characteristic woven blue stripes and patterns. This style is also associated with church linen.

Victorian interiors were full of thick, fringed draperies in deep colours, including tablecloths reaching the floor.

== Cultural references ==
A video of the trick being performed in slow motion

A popular "magic trick" involves pulling a loaded tablecloth away from a table but leaving the plates behind. This trick relies on inertia. It is known as a tablecloth pull or a tablecloth yank.

A magic tablecloth separately appears in several fairy tales.

== See also ==
- Cloche
- Coaster
- Crumber
- Doily
- Placemat
- Sufra
- Silence cloth
