= Placemat (graphic design) =

Visual, one-page summary of a topic

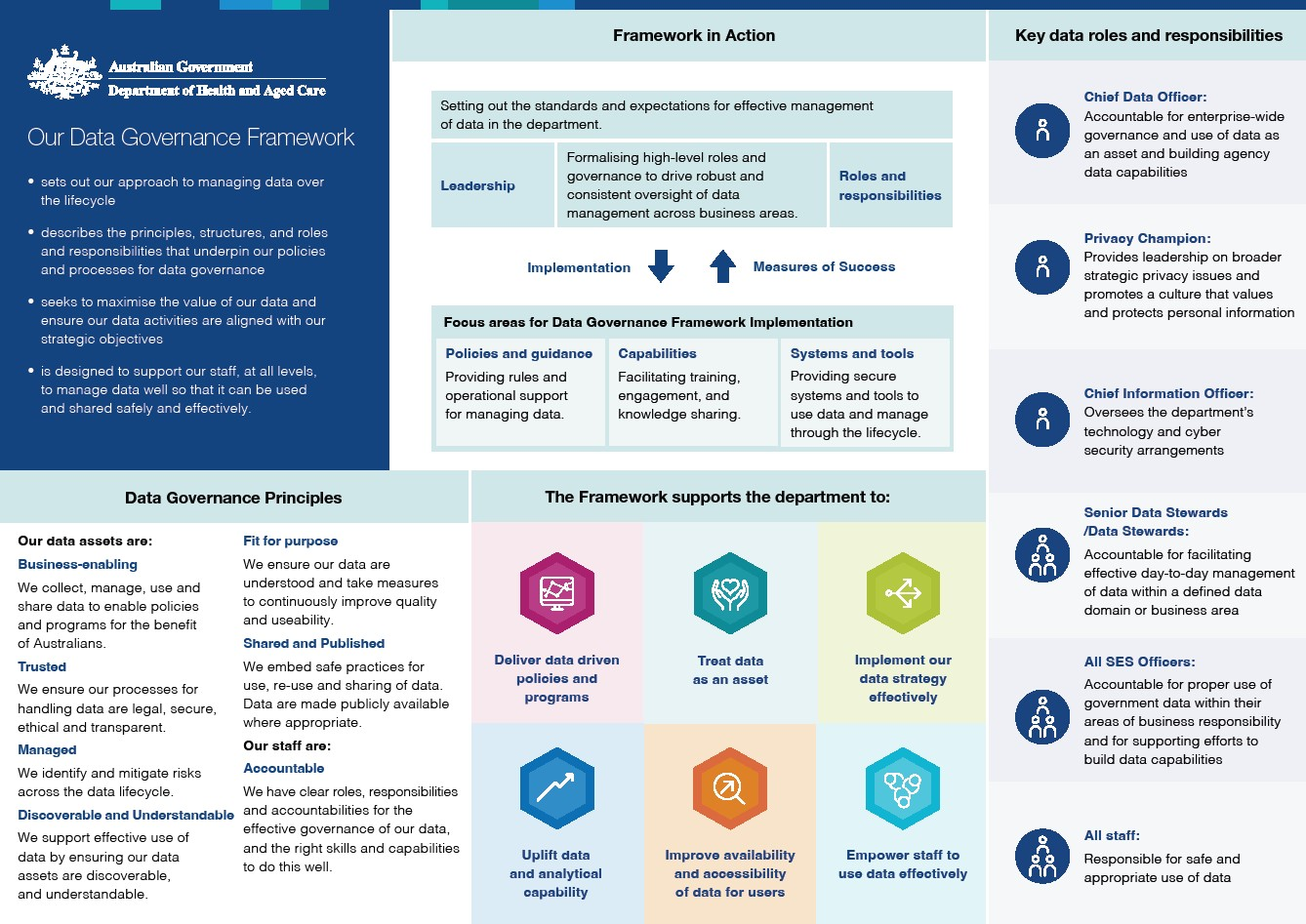
A placemat about the Data Governance Framework of the Australian Government - Department of Health

A placemat (also data placemat) in the context of graphic design is a visual, one-page summary of the key points of a topic or subject matter.

It gets its name from the physical object of a household placemat whose size, and aspect ratio (at 11 by 17 inches) it resembles. Placemats are used in decision-making and educational settings.

== Sources ==
- Allen, Daniel (2022-08-16). The Instructional Leadership Cycle. Harvard Education Press. ISBN 978-1-68253-769-5.
- Baker Mitton, Christine; Mundorf, Adrienne; Putnam-Walkerly, Kris; Krey, Susanna (2019-09-01). "Using a Decision-Making Placemat to Inform Strategy". The Foundation Review. 11 (3). doi:10.9707/1944-5660.1480. ISSN 1944-5660.
- Pankaj, Veena; Emery, Ann K. (2016). "Data Placemats: A Facilitative Technique Designed to Enhance Stakeholder Understanding of Data". New Directions for Evaluation. 2016 (149): 81–93. doi:10.1002/ev.20181. ISSN 1097-6736.
- Willner-Giwerc, Sara; Hsin, Rachel; Mody, Sonia; Rogers, Chris (2023). "Engineering Encounters: Placemat Instructions". Science and Children. 60 (3): 54–59.
