= Phelps Associates =

American fashion company

Phelps Associates was an American leather fashion accessories company originally founded in 1938 by William and Elizabeth Phelps, and subsequently relaunched in the early 2010s by their grand-nephew as T. B. Phelps.

== History ==
The company was founded in 1938 after William made his wife a couple of leather belts that her friends wanted to buy copies of. Its business model, focused solely on good quality leather goods, was inspired by artisans in Europe who ran little shops individually selling what they themselves were expert at making. One of their first successful designs was a 1941 cowhide shoulder bag with a long leather strap that became part of the US Army women's uniform.

In 1943 Phelps Associates was awarded a Coty Award in the second year of the awards being granted. The following year, they were awarded the Neiman Marcus Fashion Award.

In 1945, the Evening Star published an article about the Phelps's ongoing support and employment of disabled war veterans, noting that William Phelps (himself a World War I veteran) was so dedicated to the cause that he encouraged his workers to set up competing businesses. At this time it was reported that the company manufactured hundreds of different styles of belts and purses, and that they were among the top designers in America in their field.

In 1950, the Metropolitan Museum of Art held a landmark menswear exhibition, the first of its kind in America, titled Adam Through The Looking Glass. Elizabeth Phelps was one of twelve leading American women designers invited to create futuristic menswear looks for the show, alongside her contemporaries Claire McCardell, Tina Leser, Clare Potter and Lilly Daché. Her design for the future male comprised a faded blue denim jacket with an attached pale green shirt-front, blue denim jodhpurs and black leather belt and shoulder bag.

During the early 1950s, after the Phelpses moved to Pennsylvania, Elizabeth launched an "occupational leisure wear" line called Phelps Deep Country, which produced denim clothing aimed at American housewives. She told a journalist that after she and William moved to Pennsylvania, the only country-appropriate clothing she could find to wear was blue jeans, which he hated, and so she began designing practical womenswear designed for this lifestyle. Leather and suede were easily damaged in active country life, so Elizabeth stopped using them in her work and instead used alternative materials, as well as replacing buttons with snap fasteners. By 1964, William Phelps had died, and Elizabeth was living and working in Skyland, North Carolina. In 1969, Elizabeth joined Hanes as a consultant-designer, closing her "Deep Country" label.

Archival materials relating to Phelps Leather Goods between 1944 and 1989 are held by the National Museum of American History.

In the early 2010s, the Phelps' grand-nephew, Thomas Phelps Bates relaunched the leather goods company as T.B. Phelps, taking advantage of the family name and reputation.
