= Vera Maxwell =

American fashion designer (1901–1995)

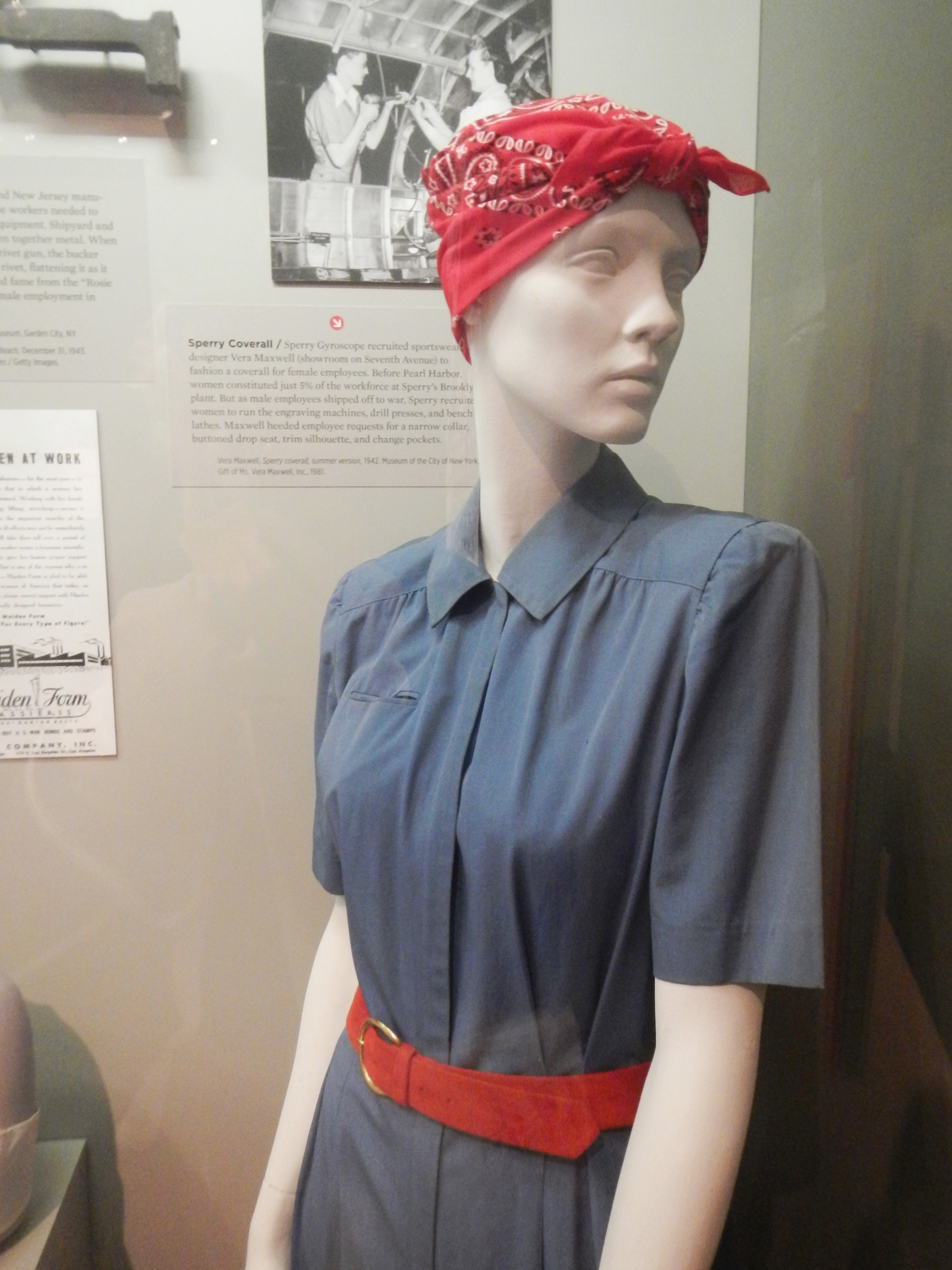
Coverall designed for wartime use

Vera Huppe Maxwell (April 22, 1901 – January 15, 1995) was an American pioneering sportswear and fashion designer.

== Background and personal life ==
Born Vera Huppe in The Bronx, Maxwell spent part of her childhood in Austria. She attended Leonia High School in Leonia, New Jersey.

She studied ballet in New York and joined the Metropolitan Opera Ballet in 1919, dancing until her marriage to financier Raymond J. Maxwell in 1924. Vera and Raymond J. Maxwell had one child and divorced in 1937.

Maxwell married architect Carlisle H. Johnson in 1938 and divorced him in 1945.

== Career ==
In the late 1920s, Maxwell began modelling at B. Altman and other New York City stores. As she explained, "When the opera season ended in May, the fashion houses on Seventh Avenue were just opening their collections. I would just walk across the street and hire on as a model." Around 1929, Maxwell began sketching for the fashion houses she modeled for.

After years of designing for other manufacturers, she founded her own company, Vera Maxwell Originals, in 1947. Her first collection was sporty, featuring after-ski clothes, tennis outfits, and riding apparel.

Maxwell was part of a pioneering group of American designers creating more relaxed and quintessentially American clothing. Her contemporaries included Claire McCardell, Clare Potter, Carolyn Schnurer, and Tina Leser. Maxwell gave her clothing distinctively American names like "Daniel Boone" for Western wear. By the 1950s, she also was designing evening wear.

Maxwell was the first American designer to make clothes of Ultrasuede and the synthetic fabric Arnel. One of her earliest best-sellers was a wrap blouse over a permanently pleated skirt made of Arnel meant for travelers.

In 1935, Maxwell released a "weekend wardrobe" of two jackets, two skirts and a pair of trousers. Inspired by Albert Einstein, the jacket was collarless with four patch pockets in tweed and gray flannel. The jacket could be mixed and matched with all three accompanying pieces: a short pleated flannel tennis skirt, a longer tweed skirt, and a pair of flannel cuffed trousers. In 1999, the New York Times wrote that the "weekend wardrobe" was "so classic they could still be worn today."

In the 1940s, she designed a cotton coverall uniform for war workers at the Sperry Gyroscope Corporation. Known as the "Rosie the Riveter" jumpsuit or coveralls, they received an "E" for excellence rating from the United States government. They were a forerunner of the modern jump suit.

Maxwell always created her designs in a range of sizes, generally going up to a size 18 or 20 at a time when it was unusual for a designer to design clothes above a size 8. Her use of wrap-and-tie closures and supple fabrics suited a range of body types and allowed for weight fluctuations. According to Maxwell, "The most fashionable women will always be the ones who know themselves."

Maxwell won the Coty Award in 1953. Maxwell met Grace Kelly in 1955 when they were both received Neiman Marcus Fashion Awards and she frequently visited the Royal Family in Monaco.

Maxwell designed for First Ladies Rosalynn Carter and Pat Nixon, as well as performers such as Martha Graham and Lillian Gish.

By 1960, Maxwell's clothes were being sold in 700 stores around the country. But in the 1960s, her star waned as fashion's attention shifted to swinging London designers like Mary Quant.

After the debut of an unsuccessful collection in 1964, Maxwell withdrew from the industry. She resurfaced in 1970 with a collection that was introduced at B. Altman. She was honored in 1970 with a retrospective at the Smithsonian Institution and in 1980 with an exhibit at the Museum of the City of New York.

In 1975, Maxwell introduced a pull-on dress with a stretch top and no zippers, buttons, snaps or ties. Called a speed suit, it was a dress a woman could slip it on in 17 seconds. It was inspired by the West German Olympic uniform and the dresses were initially priced at $99 to $199.

Maxwell retired in 1985 and closed her company. She returned in 1986 with one final collection designed for Peter Lynne before permanently retiring.

== Later life and death ==
Maxwell spent her final years with her son and daughter-in-law. She split her time between Gilgo Beach, Long Island and Rincon, Puerto Rico. Maxwell died on January 15, 1995, at age 93.

She lived in Manhattan until three years before her death.

== Legacy ==
Vera Maxwell's designs are held by the Metropolitan Museum of Art, the Rhode Island School of Design Museum, Cooper Hewitt, and the Museum of the City of New York.
