= Taveras =

Taveras and Tavera do not have the same origin. Tavera is likely of Italian origin and Taveras is likely Spanish or Portuguese surname. It may refer to:

- Alex Taveras (born 1955), baseball infielder
- Andrés Luna de San Pedro y Pardo de Tavera
- Angel Taveras (born 1970), Dominican-American lawyer
- Bartolomé Tavera Acosta
- Ben Tavera King
- Diego Tavera Ponce de Léon
- Frank Taveras (born 1949), baseball shortstop
- Hank M. Tavera
- Giselle Tavera (born 1993), singer
- Juan Tavera
- Juan Pardo de Tavera
- Juan Manuel Taveras Rodríguez (1919—2002), radiologist and pioneer in neuroradiology
- Leody Taveras (born 1998), a Dominican professional baseball player
- Maria Cristina Tavera, American artist
- Massiel Taveras (born 1984), beauty queen
- Michael Tavera
- Norlandy Taveras
- Oscar Taveras (1992–2014), Dominican-Canadian professional baseball outfielder
- Trinidad Pardo de Tavera
- Willy Taveras (born 1981), baseball outfielder
