= Tumarkin =

Tumarkin, Tomarkin or Toumarkin may refer to:

== People ==
- Anna Tumarkin (born 1875), Swiss philosopher
- Leander Tomarkin (born 1865), Swiss impostor
- lev Tumarkin, (1901-1974) Russian mathematician
- Maurice Tumarkin, (1900-1972, American fashion designer
- Peter Tomarken (born 1942), American game show host
- Yakov-Yan Toumarkin (born 1992), Israeli swimmer
- Yigal Tumarkin (born 1933), Israeli painter
- Yon Tumarkin (born 1989), Israeli actor

== Other uses ==
- Tumarkin drop attack, a sudden fall without loss of consciousness
