= Giancarlo Venturini =

Italian fashion designer

Giancarlo Venturini was an Italian knitwear designer active in the 1950s-1970s.

== Early life ==
Venturini was born in Lucca, and studied engineering at the University of Pisa. After developing an interest in fashion, he returned to Lucca where his sister Anna had established a knitting mill, and joined forces with her to develop clothing designs. In 1957, he came up with the idea of the "Portofino" collection of ensembles where unusual sweaters were matched with coordinating slacks, which was recognised as one of "the most significant innovations in knit sportswear". In 1960, Venturini launched a new company called "Maria" which specialised in hand-knitting rather than machine, and created garments showing unusually coloured intarsia combined with embroidery. His designs were well received, and he was invited to present his work at the Pitti Palace in Florence in 1965 and 1967.

Venturini was selected to receive the Neiman Marcus Fashion Award in 1967. His award was in recognition of how he had "revolutionized" knitted sportswear, according to the Schenectady Gazette. 1967 marked the first time that the award had been presented exclusively to Italian recipients, with the fellow winners being Valentino, Fiamma Ferragamo, Lydia de Roma and the fashion craftspeople of the entire city of Florence, whose award was accepted by Emilio Pucci.

Venturini retired from fashion design in 1984, became a restorer of buildings in Italy, and as of 2022, is an artist and picture-frame-builder in Castelvecchio.
