= Nubuck =

Type of top-grain leather

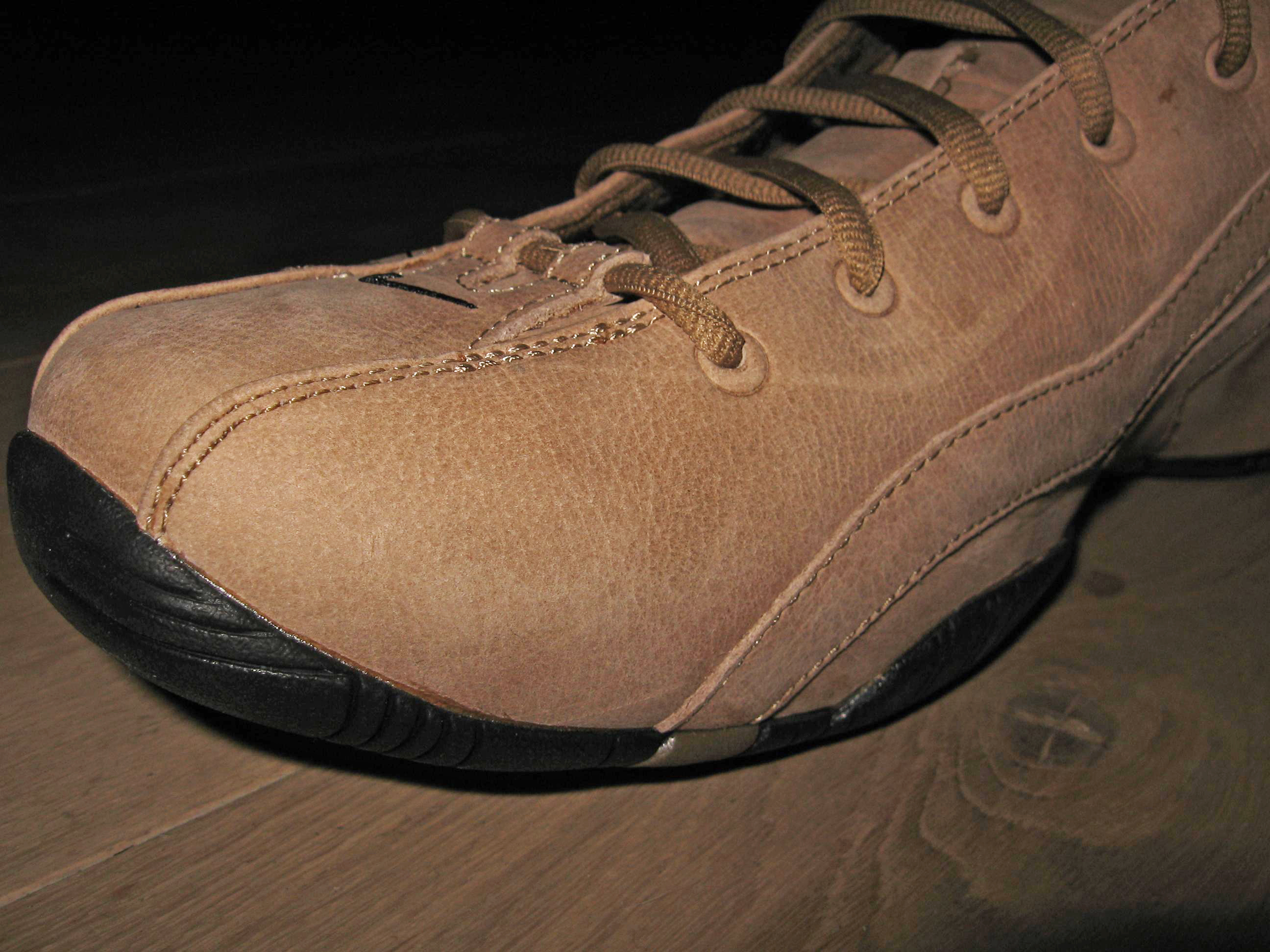
A nubuck shoe

Nubuck (pronounced /ˈnuːbʌk/) is top-grain leather that is sanded or buffed on the grain side, or outside, to give a slight nap of short protein fibers, producing a velvet-like surface. It is resistant to wear, and may be white or coloured.

Nubuck is similar to suede, but is created from the outer side of a hide, giving it more strength and thickness and a fine grain. It is generally more expensive than suede, and must be coloured or dyed heavily to cover up the sanding and stamping process.

Nubuck characteristics are similar to those of aniline leather. It is soft to the touch and scratches easily, and water drops darken it temporarily (it dries to its original color). Shoes and auto interiors are among the most common commercial uses for this leather.

Nubuck leather gets its name from "new" and "buck(skin)", a nod to the young deer hides initially used for its production. Over time, the term has expanded to include similar materials made from other types of hide, typically cowhide or calfskin.
