= Mary Brosnan =

American businesswoman and mannequin designer (1906–1988)

- Mary Brosnan, from a 1958 newspaper.
- Born: February 2, 1906; New York
- Died: January 20, 1988 (aged 81); New York
- Other names: Mary Brosnan Kratschmer (after marriage)
- Occupations: designer, businesswoman
- Awards: Neiman-Marcus Fashion Award (1966)

Mary Brosnan (February 2, 1906 – January 20, 1988), also known as Mary Brosnan Kratschmer, was an American businesswoman and mannequin designer, winner of the Neiman-Marcus Fashion Award in 1966.

== Early life ==
Mary Brosnan was born in 1906 in New York. She attended the Sacred Heart Convent school and studied art at the National Academy of Design school.

== Career ==
Brosnan was portrait painter by training. During the Great Depression, she worked as a window dresser, and when the need arose for a more glamorous mannequin, she created one. She and sculptor Kay Sullivan founded Mary Brosnan Inc., in 1941, providing American-made mannequins to stores during World War II, when European mannequins were difficult to import. Brosnan moved her manufacturing from Manhattan to Long Island in 1947. Also in 1947, her company acquired a patent for a self-standing mannequin, requiring no external stand. Her 1948 mannequins became associated with the "New Look" of Christian Dior, because they were well-matched in proportions (broad shoulders, slim hips), and Brosnan's mannequins often used in Dior window displays.

Brosnan's business was a success, and she was described as one of the "top American businesswomen" in a 1958 profile. In 1962, Mary Brosnan Inc., a division of D. G. Williams, occupied a 35,000 square-foot plant in Long Island City, with sculptors' studios, casting rooms, drying ovens and other facilities. In 1964 the factory was producing 150-200 mannequins a week. "I often wonder where the old mannequins end up," Brosnan mused in an interview that year. "Sometimes I imagine there's a big desert somewhere out in Arizona, where they are piled up like used cars."

Brosnan won the Neiman-Marcus Fashion Award in 1966. "She is the country's most eminent sculptress of the mannequins seen in store windows," explained one report about the award. In 1967 she made the mannequins for a show titled "The Art of Fashion" at the Metropolitan Museum of Art. Brosnan retired after 1973.

== Personal life ==
In 1956, Mary Brosnan married a Vienna-born importer, Robert Kratschmer. She died January 20, 1988, aged 81 years, from cancer, in New York.
