= Suede =

Type of leather with a napped finish

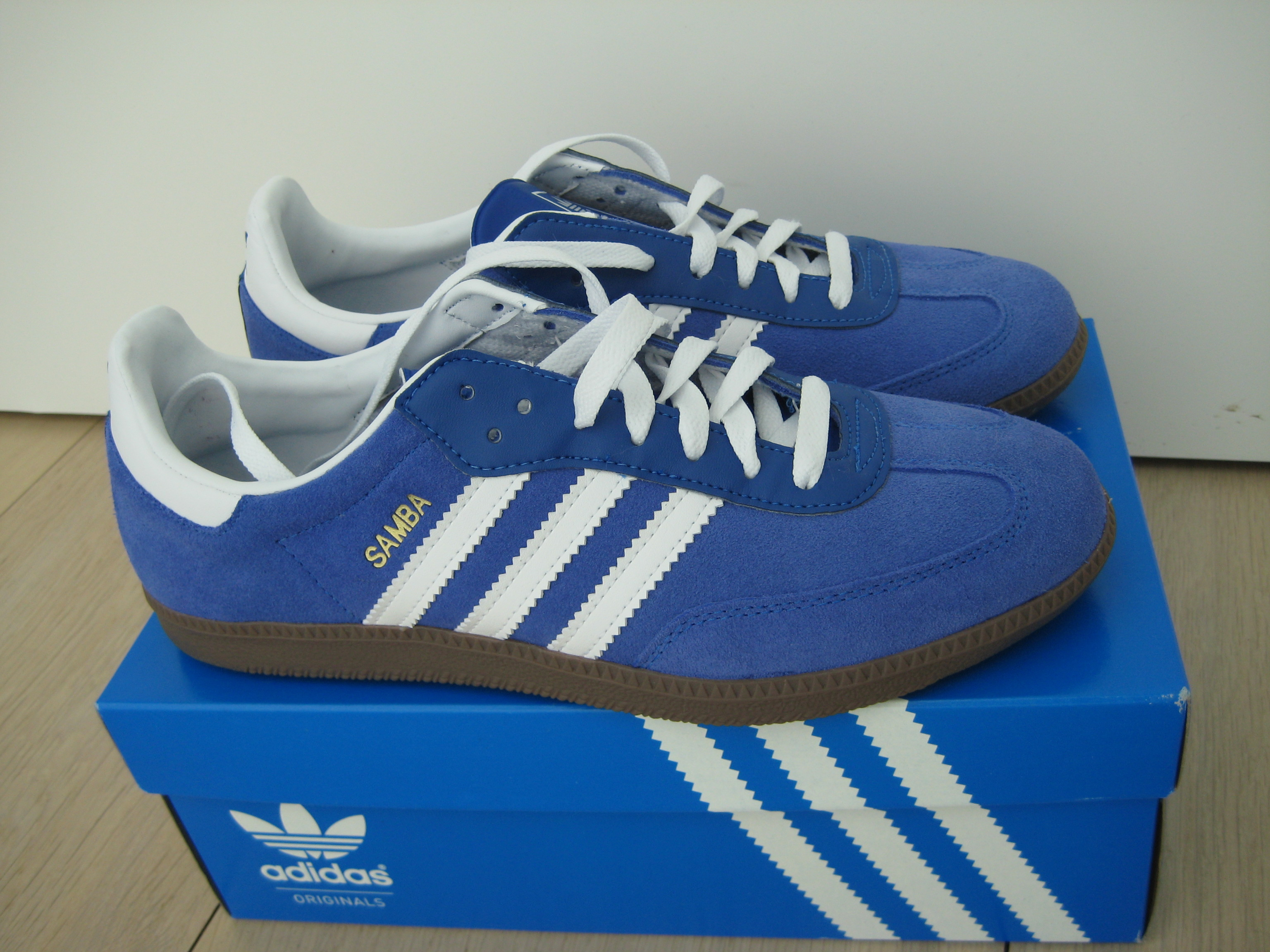
Blue suede shoes

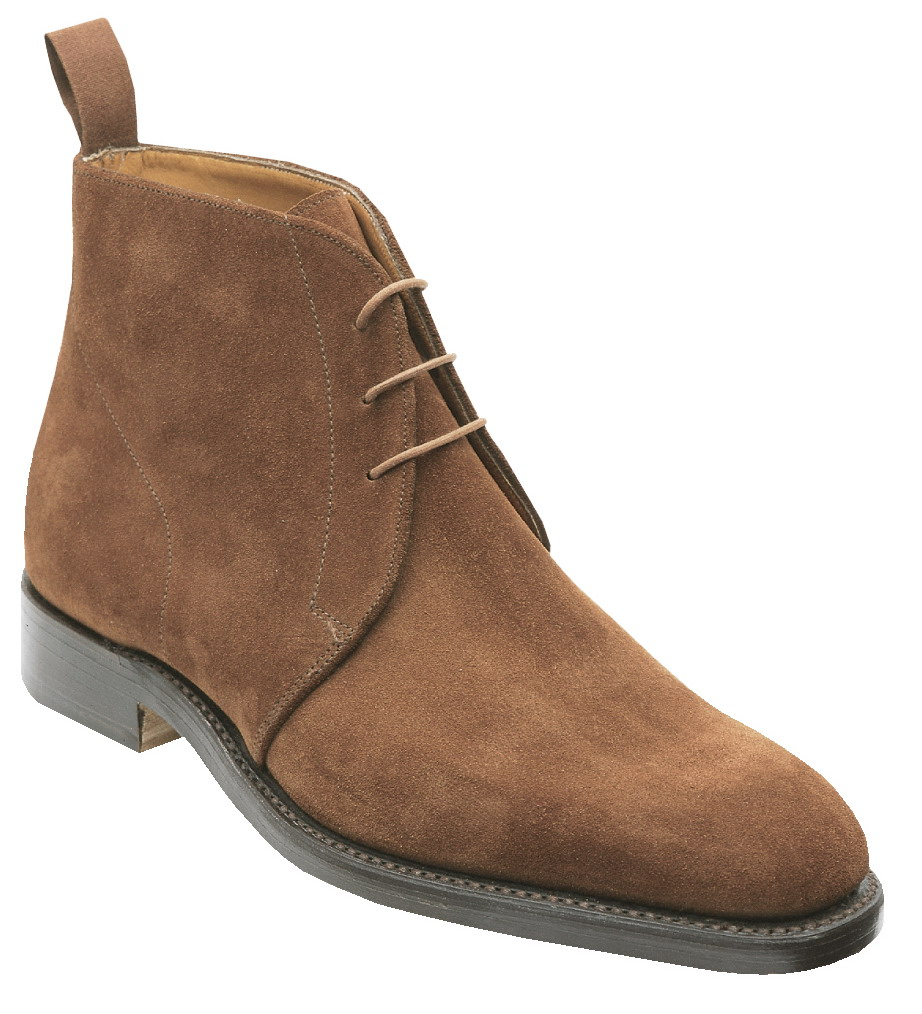
Suede boot

Suede (pronounced /sweɪd/ SWAYD) is a type of leather with a fuzzy, napped finish, commonly used for jackets, shoes, fabrics, purses, furniture, and other items.

Suede is made from the underside of the animal skin, which is softer and more pliable than the outer skin layer, though not as durable.

== Etymology ==
The term comes from the French gants de Suède, which literally means "gloves from Sweden".

== Production ==
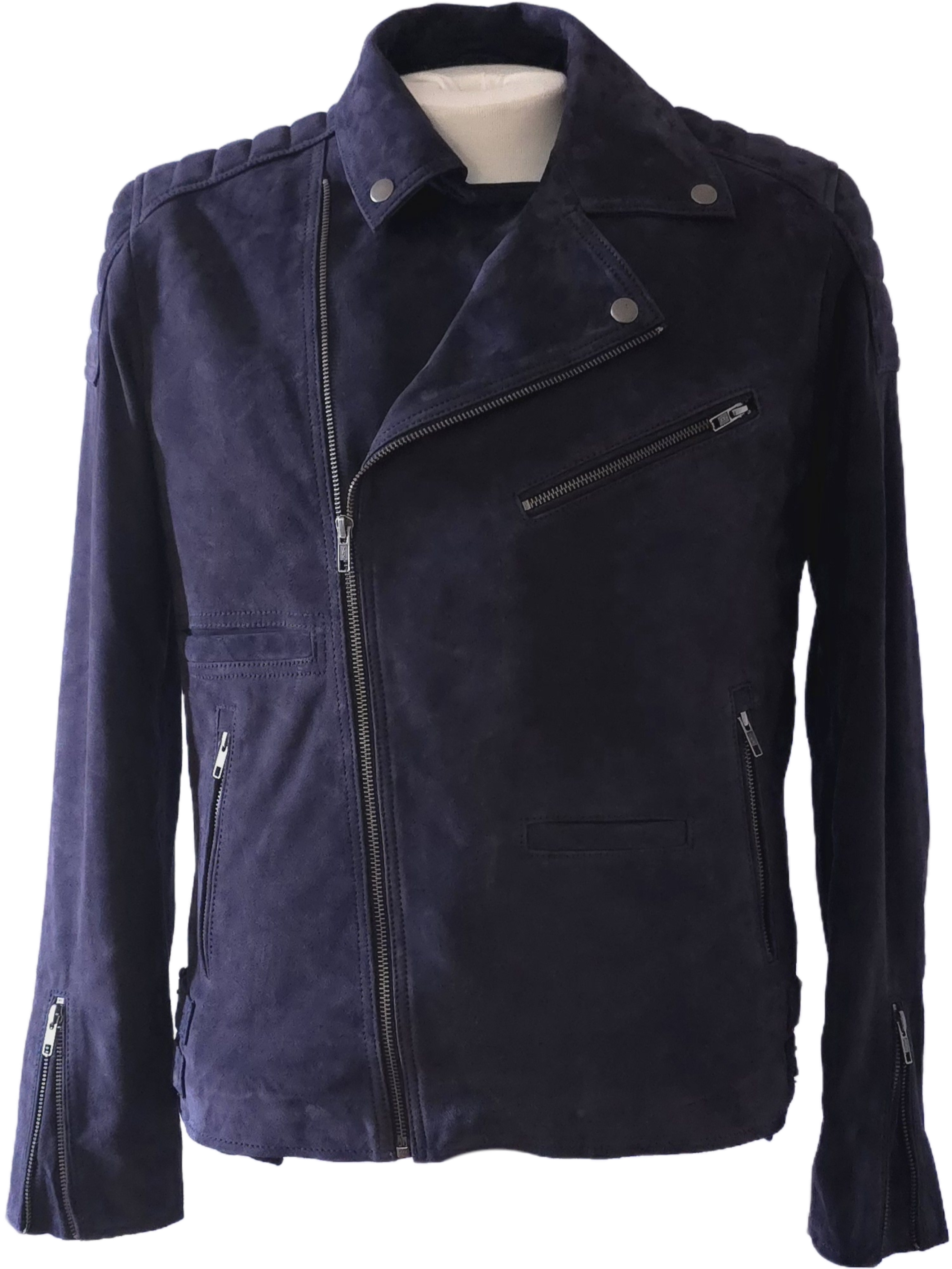
Modern Suede Jacket

Suede leather is made from the underside of the skin, primarily from lamb, although goat, calf, and deer are commonly used. Splits from thick hides of cow and deer are also sueded, but, due to the fiber content, have a shaggy nap.

== Characteristics ==
Because suede does not include the tough exterior skin layer, it is both less durable and softer than standard "full-grain" leather. Its softness, thinness, and pliability make it suitable for clothing and delicate uses.

== Uses ==
Suede was originally used for women's gloves, hence its etymology (see above).

It is a popular material for jackets, shoes, bags, upholstery, and other accessories

It is also used as a lining for other leather products. Due to its textured nature and open pores, suede may become dirty and quickly absorb liquids. Suede is often used in place of leather when more breathability (air permeation) is needed such as with hot weather footgear.

== Preservation and conditioning ==
A variety of environmental factors including salt, dirt, water, oils and moisture can stain or wear out suede. Since excess moisture can damage suede, it should not be cleaned with soap and water or machine washed. Suede brushes and suede rubbers, as well as nail files, are tools that may be used to clean suede, often in conjunction with white vinegar or cornstarch. Suede protector spray can be applied after cleaning to preserve the integrity of the fabric longer.

== In popular culture ==
- Suede's absorbent nature was highlighted in the Seinfeld episode "The Jacket", in which Jerry ventures outside into the snow and ruins his exorbitantly priced suede jacket.
- "Blue Suede Shoes" is a well-known early rock-n-roll song written by Carl Perkins and also covered by Elvis Presley.
- The song "Walking in Memphis" by Marc Cohn mentions wearing "blue suede shoes" and seeing the "ghost of Elvis".
- "Weird Al" Yankovic wrote and performed the song "King of Suede".
- "Suedehead", a skinhead subculture and song by English singer/songwriter Morrissey.
- "Johnny Suede", a film starring Brad Pitt where he plays a down-and-out musician with a huge pompadour haircut.
- "Suede" is a song by Tori Amos from the album To Venus and Back
- "Suede" is a song by Los Angeles-based duo NxWorries, released as the lead single of their debut EP, Link Up & Suede
- The song "Los Pollos Hermanos", by the British rapper Knucks, contains this bar: "My trench coat leather, my shoes are suede"

== See also ==
- Suede (band)
- Nap (fabric)
- Shearing (textiles)
- Nubuck
- Voris, 1930s–1940s American fashion designer who worked exclusively in suede
