= Florence Eiseman =

American fashion designer

Florence Feinberg Eiseman
- Born: Florence Feinberg; September 27, 1899; Minneapolis
- Died: January 8, 1988 (aged 88); Milwaukee
- Known for: Children's clothing
- Awards: Neiman Marcus Fashion Award, 1955

Florence Feinberg Eiseman (1899–1988) was an American fashion designer specializing in children's clothing. She launched the Florence Eiseman childrenswear business in 1945, which became one of Wisconsin's leading fashion brands.

== Biography ==
Florence Feinberg was born in Minneapolis on September 27, 1899. Quitting college after a year, she trained as a stenographer before marrying Laurence Eiseman and moving with him to Milwaukee where they had two sons. Soon afterwards, Eiseman saw a doctor about a "nervous condition" and was advised to find a hobby, which she found in making clothing for her two young sons Laurence Jr. and Robert, and for her friends' children.

Meanwhile, Laurence worked as a debt collector and then managed a toy factory, which began failing in 1945, leading him to bring some of his wife's childrenswear to Ann Lehman, the buyer at the Chicago department store Marshall Field's. The subsequent huge order launched the Florence Eiseman business, and Lehman became an important mentor to Florence. With the success of the business, Laurence Eiseman gave up the toy factory to support his wife full-time, and Florence was able to pursue her love of 18th-century Worcester porcelain and modern art, collecting works by Alexander Calder, Henri Matisse, Pablo Picasso, and Jean Dubuffet. Laurence Eiseman died in 1967.

Despite her slight build (she was only 4'10 tall) and apparent shy and retiring nature, Eiseman could also be outspoken and direct in business and when dealing with other people. By 1985, Eiseman was largely house-bound due to emphysema and back problems, but remained closely involved with her business, having designs brought to her at home for her approval. She died January 8, 1988, at Columbia Hospital, Milwaukee, of emphysema.

== Business ==
The Florence Eiseman brand was launched in 1945, and became the "leading high-end children's clothing line in the United States." Their first big order came from the Chicago department store Marshall Field's in 1945. The buyer at Marshall Field's, Ann Lehman, became an important figure in Eiseman's life, giving her crucial advice on how to design for children's figures.

In 1955, Eiseman was awarded the Neiman Marcus Fashion Award. In 1985, Stanley Marcus said of Eiseman that she had courage in her belief that parents who appreciated good clothes would also wish their children to have good clothing, and that she "defined the market."

Eiseman's work was known for using A-line silhouettes, pinafores that could be buttoned to the front of dresses, and bold appliqué designs. Sarah Eichhorn, curator of the fashion collection at Mount Mary University which holds a number of Eiseman designs, described the designer's work as emphasizing the postwar image of the "idyllic, child-centered" American nuclear family and changing the perceptions of children from being miniature adults, to being "playful and innocent." She designed coordinating and matching outfits for siblings, both brother-and-sister and big-and-little-sister sets, and created classic clothing that was intended to be passed down through the generations. Eiseman also designed clothing specifically for children with disabilities, such as dresses with longer hems that could be worn with crutches and large, easy-to-maneuver buttons. The garments were made to a very high standard using the highest-quality European cottons and linens. In 1988, Carla Slocum, the vice-president of Saks Fifth Avenue, specializing in childrenswear, said that Florence Eiseman had "been one of the most influential figures in the children's fashion industry over the last several decades," and credited her with "raising the standards of fashion and quality in better children's wear."

By 1985, Eiseman had reduced her involvement in the company due to poor health, having a staff of three designers bring their designs to her at home for her final approval. The company had also begun increasingly using fabric blends rather than pure cotton and linen, simplifying appliqué designs, and started using computers to store designs and a large plotter for pattern production. The business was run by her sons Laurence Jr.(president) and Robert Eiseman, chief executive officer. At this time, the mid 1980s, the company was at its peak, making sales of about 7 million dollars a year, and employing around 130 people. By 2017, following several bankruptcies and changes of ownership, the business had outsourced production to El Salvador and was employing 20 people including the head designer Teri Shapiro Larson, who, aged 21, came to the company in 1972 straight from the Fashion Institute of Technology, and worked closely with Eiseman up until her death.

=== Notable customers and wearers ===
Among those who wore Florence Eiseman clothing as children in the 20th century were Carrie Fisher, John and Caroline Kennedy, and Princesses Caroline and Stéphanie of Monaco, while Elizabeth Taylor and the Rockefeller family were notable customers. In the 21st century, Beyoncé's daughter Blue Ivy wore a Florence Eiseman dress to the second inauguration of Barack Obama, and Katie Holmes's daughter, Suri, has been seen wearing Florence Eiseman designs. During the Obama presidency, the official Presidential baby gifts were specially ordered by Barack and Michelle Obama from Florence Eiseman. These gifts, bearing the Presidential seal and the embroidered signatures of the Obamas, were individually personalized with embroidery of the child recipient's name.

== Exhibitions ==
In 1964, there was a retrospective of Eiseman's work at the Denver Art Museum. The New York Times commented in 1988 that this was probably the first time that a children's fashion designer had been so honored by a museum retrospective.

In 1985 the Milwaukee Art Museum hosted a retrospective of Eiseman's work to mark the 40th anniversary of the business foundation.

Another retrospective was hosted by the Museum of Wisconsin Art in 2017, titled "Florence Eiseman: Designing Childhood for the American Century." A number of the exhibits came from the collection of Mount Mary University, which holds a large collection of Florence Eiseman pieces as examples of Milwaukee's fashion history and industry. The exhibition was produced in association with the Chipstone Foundation

Eiseman clothing is also held by the Costume Institute and the Museum of Fine Arts, Boston.
