= Neatnik Saucer =

Baby high chair cover

- Type: High chair cover
- Inventor: Danielle Batchelor and Cookie Centracco
- Inception: 2007
- Manufacturer: Coulson's Crib, LLC
- Website: www.neatniksaucer.com

Neatnik Saucer is a multipurpose high chair cover and baby place mat. It has a sanitary barrier for infants. Neatnik is a collapsible product. It is manufactured and distributed by Coulson's Crib, LLC, a Houston-based company.

The Neatnik Saucer consists of a waterproof tray portion attached to a seat portion with a flexible rim to catch spills and food. It has suction cups on the underside of the placemat section, straps to secure toys, and pacifiers. The Neatnik Saucer is collapsible into a bag.

== History ==
In 2007, the inventors, Danielle Batchelor and Cookie Centracco, created the first product that covered an extendable high chair to prevent food and toys from falling to the floor.

On May 18, 2010, the Neatnik Saucer was granted its patent.

== Awards ==
- Parent Tested Parent Approved Award Winner
- 2010 National Parenting Center Seal of Approval Winner
- The Lekotek Center Helping Children with Special Needs "Great Find" in all areas of Disability
- Wes Watkins New Product and Process Fair – Grand Prize Winner Overall and First Place Winner in Small Business 2009
