= Olga di Grésy =

Italian fashion designer (1900–1994)

- Olga di Grésy, c. 1960s
- Born: Olga di Villarey; 1900; Turin
- Died: 1994 (aged 93–94); Novara
- Known for: Knitwear
- Label: Mirsa
- Spouse(s): Orazio Cisa Asinari di Grésy, Marquess of Grésy, 1922-1958 (his death)
- Awards: Neiman Marcus Fashion Award, 1953

Marchesa Olga di Grésy (1900–1994) was an Italian fashion designer specialising in knitwear, active between 1928 and 1984. Her company, Mirsa, was one of the most successful Italian knitwear companies of the immediately post-Second World War period, and she was the first woman to be made a Knight of the Order of Merit for Labour.

== Biography ==
Olga di Villarey was born in Turin in 1900, the daughter of Count Rey di Villarey. In 1922, she married Orazio Cisa Asinari di Grésy, Marquess of Grésy, Lord of Soglio and Casasco, Co-Lord of Castagneto Po and Cimena (1897–1958); with whom she had two children - Alessandro (Sadro), who inherited his father's titles in 1958, and Vladimira (Mirella).

In 1926, Orazio lost the di Grésy fortune on the stock market, which meant that Olga had to work for a living. She started out by hand-knitting children's clothing, before setting up knitting machines in Milan in 1937. The name of her company, Mirsa, was constructed from the first few letters of her children's names, Mirella and Sadro. During the Second World War the Mirsa factory was relocated to Galliate.

In 1948, the Mirsa workforce numbered 80 employees, which increased to 650 (and 350 machines) in 1970, and 653 in 1973.

During the post-war boom in popularity of Italian knitwear among American buyers, Mirsa was one of the most desirable and widely recognised names. In 1953, Olga di Grésy was awarded a Neiman Marcus Fashion Award. In 1968, Italy awarded Olga di Grésy the Cavaliere del Lavoro - an honor which recognised her success in business, and which was rarely awarded to women. She was the first woman to be awarded this title.

In 1970, garments produced by Mirsa and bearing Olga di Grésy's name were sold through I. Magnin, Abercrombie & Fitch, and other department stores. di Grésy was known for her widely varied knitwear, including not just obvious knits, but knitted fabrics that resembled velvet or patchwork and were made from yarn spun and dyed by the company. di Grésy garments were versatile, intended to be wearable at any point in the day or evening with slight styling changes, and also to appeal to all ages. In 1970, di Grésy shared design responsibilities with her daughter-in-law, Louisa.

In March 1977 Mirsa entered receivership, although it continued producing knitwear for others until 1984.

Olga di Grésy died in Novara in 1994.
