= Voris (designer) =

American sculptor (1908–1973)

Voris Linthacum Marker
- Born: Voris Linthacum; 20 September 1908; Baker City, Oregon, U.S.
- Died: 22 May 1973 (aged 64); Beverly Hills, California, U.S.
- Label: Suedes by Voris
- Awards: Neiman Marcus Fashion Award, 1942

Voris was the professional name of Voris Marker (20 September 1908 – 22 May 1973), an American designer of suede sportswear who won the Neiman Marcus Fashion Award in 1942 for her work. As Voris Marker, she also worked as a sculptor.

== Early life and education ==
Born Voris Linthacum in Baker City, Oregon according to her marriage certificate, but growing up on a ranch near Billings, Montana, Voris worked as a copywriter for an advertising agency in Chicago after finishing school in Montana.

== Career ==
While in Chicago, she had to have an operation on her leg, which led to her returning home as an invalid. Whilst recuperating, Voris came across a piece of soft chamois leather, which inspired her to use it to make up clothing. She made a golf skirt for a Spokane woman to wear in a tournament. Other players and spectators noticed the skirt, and asked Voris to make them leather garments too. She founded her business, Suedes by Voris, in 1933, and by 1940, had shops in Hollywood (where she sold garments to many actors) and across the Southwest, selling a wide range of clothing entirely made in suede. Her range included day and evening wear, hats, jewelry, and men's jackets, shirts, and ties, made in a wide range of colors. One noted design was a gold-plated evening jacket. When the couturier Elsa Schiaparelli visited Neiman Marcus and was invited to choose any one thing she wanted from the store; she chose a Voris coat as "the most distinctive fashion she had ever seen by an American designer." It has been suggested that this inspired the decision to award Voris the Neiman Marcus Fashion Award in 1942.

Voris later gave up the business to dedicate herself to sculpting. Following her receipt of the Neiman Marcus award, she was commissioned to create a bronze portrait of Herbert Marcus, the co-founder of the store. She made a memorial bust of Gary Cooper for the Friars Club of Beverly Hills in 1961.

== Personal life ==
On 29 November 1936, Voris married Clifford H. Marker (1899–1987) who went on to become a President of the Board of Water and Power Commissioners in the early 1960s. She died on 22 May 1973.
