= Germaine Monteil =

American fashion designer (born 1898)

- Born: 1898; France
- Died: 1987 (aged 88–89)
- Occupations: Fashion designer; cosmetician
- Type: Fashion; cosmetics; perfumes

Germaine Monteil was a New York–based French fashion designer and cosmetician who founded the cosmetics and perfume company sharing her name.

== Fashion ==
Born in France in 1898, Monteil moved to the United States in the early 1930s. A high-end dressmaker and cosmetician, she first established herself as a fashion designer. She made classic dresses with flaring circular or pleated skirts and slim silhouettes, and was renowned for her use of prints which appealed to the American market. In 1938, Monteil won a Neiman Marcus Fashion Award in recognition of her influence upon the fashion industry. This was the first year in which the awards were presented. She died in 1987.

== Cosmetics and perfumes ==
In 1936, Monteil founded with her husband, Guy Bjorkman, Germaine Monteil Cosmetiques Corp. as a sideline to her fashion business, offering skin treatments and creams. Her first perfume, Laughter (later renamed Rigolade), came out in 1941. The increasing success of this sideline led to Monteil abandoning fashion design in the late 1940s to focus on perfume and cosmetics. The company was acquired by cosmetics giant Revlon in 1987 from fashion house Yves Saint Laurent. Revlon then sold the brand on to the German company Wilde Cosmetics GmbH in 2006.

Monteil fragrances include:

=== 1940s ===
- Laughter
- New Love
- Nostalgia
- Frou Frou

=== 1950s ===
- Fleur Savage
- Gigolo
- Royal Secret
- Nouvel Amour
- Rigolade

=== 1990s ===
- L'Eau de Monteil (1996)
