= Marghab Linens =

Marghab Linens Ltd. was a company specialising in table linens founded on Madeira in 1933 by British Cypriot Emile Marghab and his South Dakotan wife Vera (née Way); and disestablished in 1980. The company was also known as Emile Marghab Inc.

Since 1850, when Madeiran natives were introduced to hand embroidery as a means of industry, the islands had been renowned for their needlework. The Marghabs took advantage of this reputation, producing textiles that were skilfully hand-embroidered on the highest quality Irish linen and a form of organdy called Margandie, made in Switzerland, and harder wearing than usual organdy. The linens were designed by Vera, and hand-embroidered as a home industry by the women on Madeira, who Vera insisted received payment per stitch - which for a single place mat could amount to seventy thousand stitches.

Marghab linens were retailed through leading American department stores such as Lord & Taylor, Marshall Field's, and Neiman Marcus. In 1945 Vera Marghab was awarded the Neiman Marcus Fashion Award. Emile died in 1947, and his wife took charge of the business until its disestablishment in 1980. She died in 1995.

While linens have continued to be produced by Madeira since Marghab closed in 1980, as of 2015 the quality and workmanship in Marghab's output remains highly regarded.

In 1970, the South Dakota Art Museum were gifted nearly eight hundred examples of Marghab linens, followed by many gifts from Vera and her trustees. The Marghab Gallery was dedicated in 1970. As of 2015, the museum's holdings are described as the world's most complete collection of Marghab linens, with over three hundred patterns and almost 2800 objects. The museum holds at least one example of almost every design produced, but deaccessioned and sold off all the duplicates at auction in 2005 in order to raise money for building work. At the time of the auction, it was noted that Marghab linens had previously sold for hundreds of dollars over their reserve prices, and that it was extremely difficult to find matched sets.
