= Crumber =

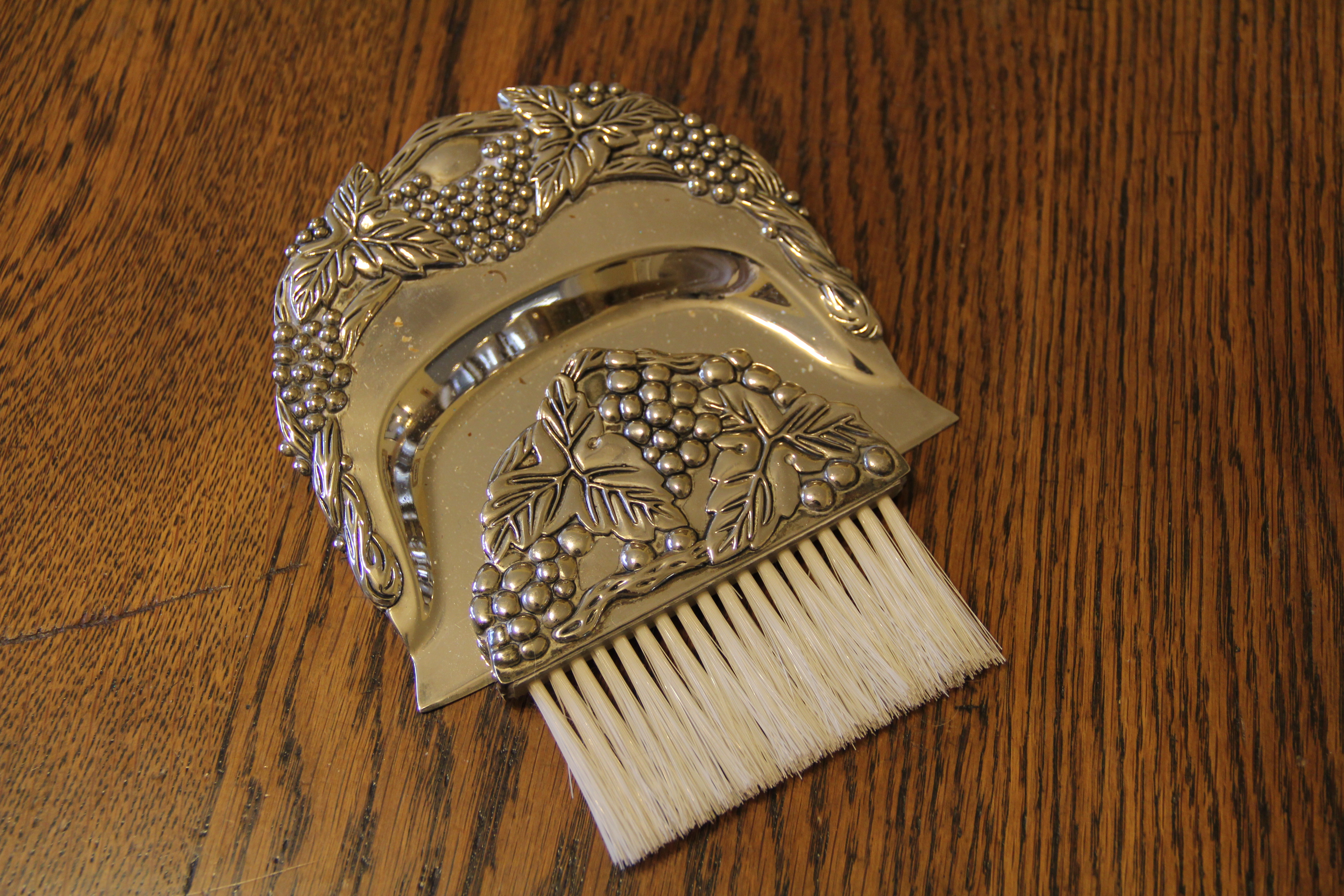
Silver table crumber with brush

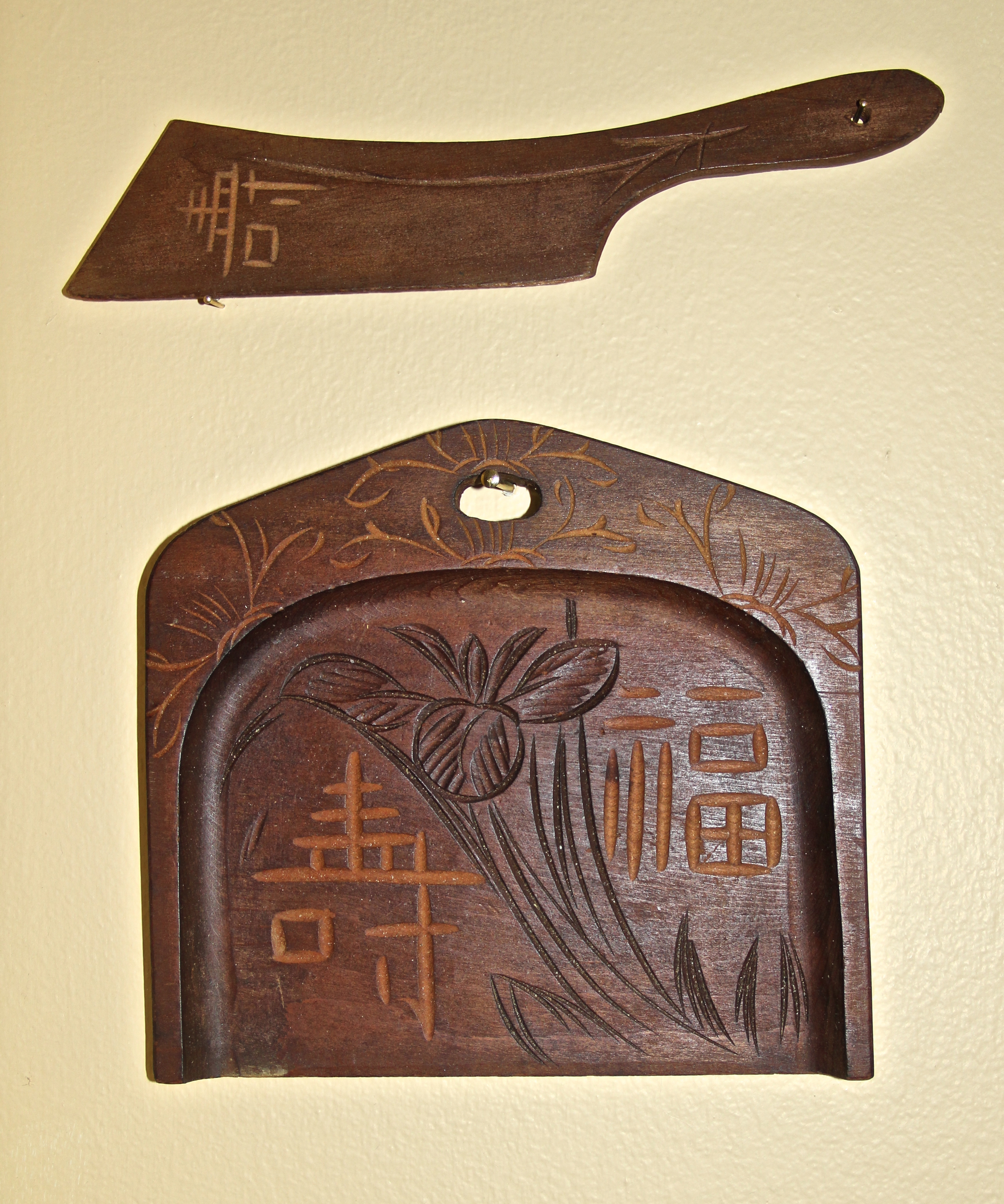
Wooden table crumber from China

A crumber (also called a table crumber) is a tool designed to remove crumbs from a tablecloth, used especially in fine dining situations. The modern form of the crumber was invented in 1939 by John Henry Miller, owner of a restaurant on West Fayette Street in Baltimore. The crumber was intended to be carried "conveniently in the pocket", and less conspicuous than the brush and pan customarily used to remove crumbs after the meal. Miller was granted a patent for his invention in 1941, obtained another patent for improvements in 1946, and ultimately and later sold his patents to the Ray Machine company of Baltimore, which still manufactures and sells the tool. As of 2010, Ray Machine was selling about 85,000 crumbers per year. A typical table crumber is approximately 6 inches in length, 1/2 inch in girth, curved, and made of metal, but a wide variety of designs exist.
