= Lucie Ann Onderwyzer =

American lingerie designer

Lucie Ann Onderwyzer (1913–1988) was an American lingerie designer and founder of the Lucie Ann brand in 1949.

In 1949 Onderwyzer and her partner Anne Briggs launched Lucie Ann Lingerie of Beverly Hills, which became known for its use of unexpected color, and for its use of marabou feather trimmings. Eva Gabor often wore Lucie Ann designs in her TV sitcom Green Acres (1965–1971). Around 1961, she launched a line named "Claire Sandra", named after her daughter who was born in 1947. Onderwyzer won the Neiman Marcus Fashion Award in 1966.

Onderwyzer died on 18 March 1988, aged 75, in Los Angeles following a stroke. The Lucie Ann brand was subsequently sold to Deena Inc., and rechristened "Lucie Ann II", before being sold in 1996 to Lady Ester Lingerie Corp.
