= Thea Tewi =

German-American sculptor and fashion designer (1902–1999)

- Thea Tewi in 1975
- Born: Thea Wittner; June 24, 1902; Berlin, Germany
- Died: July 5, 1999 (aged 97); Queens, New York, US
- Known for: sculpture, fashion design
- Awards: Neiman Marcus Fashion Award, 1945

Thea Tewi (June 24, 1902 – July 5, 1999) was a German-born American sculptor known for her work in stone. During the 1940s she was also a successful fashion designer who was proclaimed America's top lingerie designer in 1947.

== Early life and education ==
Thea Wittner was born in Berlin on June 24, 1902, although some sources state 1915. She studied at Staatliche Kunstakademie under the direction of Bruno Paul. In 1938, Thea, her Polish husband Kalman Schlachet and their son Peter came to the United States as Jewish refugees from Nazi Germany, and she eventually gained American citizenship in 1944, at which time she took the surname Tewi.

Tewi continued studying throughout her life, attending the SculptureCenter between 1953 and 1956, the Art Students League from 1954 to 1955, and in 1955, alongside Seymour Lipton and Manolo Pascual, she went to The New School for Social Research. In 1970, she went to research lost-wax casting and bronze casting in Pietrasanta, Italy.

== Career ==
=== Fashion designer ===
As a lingerie designer, Tewi was active in New York in the 1940s. Her brand, Tewi Lingerie Inc., was extremely successful, leading to Tewi winning a Neiman Marcus Fashion Award in 1945. Reporting on fashion trends that year, the Detroit Free Press referred to Tewi's "naughty-nice lingerie" featuring "daring cuts" and racy appliqués. Two Thea Tewi garments are in the Metropolitan Museum of Art's Costume Institute: a silk nightgown called "Busting Out All Over" and an embroidered silk and lace slip called "Ripe Roses."

In 1947, the Textile Colorist journal, while reporting on Tewi's electric-blanket inspired nightgowns, noted that she had been named America's top lingerie designer. In 1950, Thea Tewi Lingerie merged with another leading company, Dutchess Underwear, to offer a line called "Dutchess Individually Yours by Tewi." In 1950, she returned to sculpting. In the 1960s, although Tewi was now regarded and established as a sculptor, she was still remembered as having been a "leading high fashion lingerie designer."

=== Artist ===
Tewi started out working in metal, but switched to stone as her favourite material, particularly marble and onyx. She resumed sculpting in 1950 following her career as a lingerie designer.

Tewi frequently brought Jewish themes and motifs into her sculpture, including a work using the Hebrew alphabet as its basis which won her the National Arts Club award for religious sculpture in 1966. Her stonework included an art deco style headstone for the grave of Frederick and Helen Serger in Maple Grove Cemetery, Queens, New York. She represented the United States at the 1969 Biennale in Carrara, Italy.

Tewi exhibited widely from the 1960s to the early 1990s, with solo shows in galleries and venues across the United States and Italy, and participated in a number of exhibitions held across America and in Paris and Italy. Examples of her sculpture are held by the Smithsonian American Art Museum, the Cincinnati Art Museum, the Chrysler Museum of Art, and many other institutions. Her work is also owned by The Bank of Tokyo, Citicorp, the New York City Department of Parks and Recreation, and Pfizer.

== Prizes ==
Among the prizes received by Tewi were a Special Award for Outstanding Merit in Craftsmanship from the Artists-Craftsmen New York in 1967; a Medal of Honor and First Prize for Sculpture from the National Association of Women Artists in 1969; and a First Prize for Sculpture from the American Society of Contemporary Artists in 1971.

== Memberships ==
Tewi was a former president of the Sculptors League and an honorary president of the League of Present-Day Artists. She was also a member of the American Society of Contemporary Artists, the Artists-Craftsmen New York, and the National Association of Women Artists; she chaired the latter group's Sculpture Jury from 1969 to 1972.

== Personal life ==
In 1980, Tewi was reported as dividing her life between Maryland, New York, and Italy.

She died in Queens, New York at the age of 97 in 1999. When her death was recorded, she was entered as Thea Schlachet.
