= Park Avenue (musical) =

- Music: Arthur Schwartz
- Lyrics: Ira Gershwin
- Book: George S. Kaufman and Nunnally Johnson
- Productions: 1946 Broadway

Park Avenue is a musical with a book by George S. Kaufman and Nunnally Johnson, music by Arthur Schwartz and lyrics by Ira Gershwin. It was produced by Max Gordon with costumes by Tina Leser. The plot focused on the many divorces and marriages of the rich and "black tie" set. The production performed poorly and was Gershwin's last work for Broadway.

== Background and production ==
Gershwin wanted Park Avenue to be a change from period shows such as Oklahoma!. The plot was based on Nunnally Johnson's short story "Holy Matrimony", published in the Saturday Evening Post. He wrote "smart" lyrics like "We live in an age that’s the pinnacle of the cynical", but the show's theme of divorce could not hold the audience's attention for an entire evening, and in 1946 American audiences wanted more. The book stuck too closely to Johnson's short story and an overlong second act consisted more of spoken words than songs.

The production was in pre-Broadway out-of-town tryouts for 5½ weeks. The musical opened on Broadway at the Shubert Theatre on November 4, 1946, and closed on January 4, 1947, after 72 performances. Directed by Kaufman with choreography by Helen Tamiris, the cast featured David Wayne as Mr. Meachem, Ray McDonald as Ned Scott, Martha Stewart as Madge Bennett, Leonora Corbett as Mrs. Sybil Bennett, Mary Wickes as Mrs. Betty Nelson, and Arthur Margetson as Ogden Bennett.

An Equity Showcase concert, New York City, ran in 1999.

== Synopsis ==
The preparations for the wedding of young lovers Madge Bennett and Ned Scott are proceeding at the Long Island summer home of her mother Sybil and her 4th husband Ogden. The guests are the rich habitués of Park Avenue, who divorce and remarry so often that their lawyer, Mr. Meachem, becomes confused as to who is married to whom. Between husbands, the women discuss what to do with their time ("Don't Be A Woman if You Can"), listing their choices over clothing and nail polish. Mrs. Bennett and Mr. Meachem praise the "divorce capitol", "Sweet Nevada", as they waltz. Madge and Ned see the crumbled marriages around them and decide to call off their wedding plans ("Goodbye to All That").

== Songs ==
Act 1

- Tomorrow Is the Time - Mrs. Laura Woods and Bridesmaids
- For the Life of Me - Ned Scott and Madge Bennett
- The Dew Was on the Rose - Mrs. Sybil Bennett, Ogden Bennett, Reggie Fox, Richard Nelson and Charles Crowell
- Don't Be a Woman If You Can - Mrs. Betty Nelson, Mrs. Elsa Crowell and Mrs. Myra Fox
- Sweet Nevada - Mrs. Sybil Bennett and Mr. Meachem
- There's No Holding Me - Madge Bennett and Ned Scott
- The Dew Was on the Rose (Reprise)- Mrs. Sybil Bennett and Ogden Bennett
- There's Nothing Like Marriage for People - Entire Company

Act 2

- Hope for the Best – Bridesmaids, Ted Woods and James Meredith
- My Son-in-Law – Mrs. Sybil Bennett, Madge Bennett and Richard Nelson
- Land of Opportunities – Ogden Bennett, Richard Nelson, Reggie Fox and Charles Crowell
- Goodbye to All That – Madge Bennett and Ned Scott
- Echo – Ted Woods, Mrs. Laura Woods, James Meredith, Mrs. Beverly Meredith and Bridesmaids

== Critical reception ==
Brooks Atkinson theatre critic for The New York Times wrote, "Some of the most imposing people in show business are collaborating on a singularly unimposing musical comedy... The snobberies of the people they are satirizing have infected the writers... They are too fascinated by their astringent style to write a good, earthy musical show. It ain't funny, McGee."
