= Neiman Marcus Fashion Award =

Award for Distinguished Service in the Field of Fashion

The Neiman Marcus Award for Distinguished Service in the Field of Fashion was a yearly award created in 1938 by Carrie Marcus Neiman and Stanley Marcus. Unlike the Coty Award, it was not limited to American-based fashion designers. Recipients of the Neiman Marcus Awards include couturiers, non-American-based designers, journalists, manufacturers, and celebrities and style icons who had had a significant personal influence upon fashion such as Grace Kelly and Grace Mirabella. The award was typically presented to multiple recipients each year, rather than to a single individual, although Adrian was the sole winner in 1943, a feat repeated in 1957 by Coco Chanel. From 1969 the awards became increasingly intermittent, with ceremonies held in 1973, 1979, 1980, 1984 and 1995, the last year in which the awards were presented. For the final ceremony, the founder, Stanley Marcus, received one of his own awards.

== Award winners ==
This is a complete list of recipients of the Neiman Marcus Fashion Award from 1938 onwards.

=== 1938-1949 ===
- 1938

Louise B. Gallagher
John-Frederics
Richard Koret
Dorothy Liebes
George Miller
Germaine Monteil
Dan Palter
Nettie Rosenstein

- 1939

Elizabeth Arden
Hattie Carnegie
John Cavanagh
Janet May
Clare Potter

- 1940

Edna Woolman Chase
Lilly Daché
Elsa Schiaparelli
Sylvan Stroock

- 1941

Anthony Blotta
Omar Kiam
Eleanor LeMaire
Max Meyer
Carmel Snow
Madame Tobe

- 1942

Betsy Blackwell
Norman Norell
Voris

- 1943

Adrian

- 1944

Brooke Cadwallader
Jo Copeland
Countess Mara
Ben King

- 1945

Tina Leser
Vera Marghab
Maurice Rentner
Dr. Francis Taylor
Thea Tewi
Louis A Weinberg
Emily Wilkens

- 1946

John M. Gates, design director for Steuben Glass Works
William H. and Faie Joyce of Joyce Shoes
Slim Keith (as Mrs. Leland Hayward)
William and Elizabeth Phelps
Adele Simpson

- 1947

Christian Dior
Salvatore Ferragamo
Norman Hartnell
Irene Gibbons

- 1948

Mme. Henri Bonnet (wife of Henri Bonnet, French Ambassador to the United States 1944-54)
Antonio del Castillo
Claire McCardell
Julius Ochs Adler

- 1949

Alice Cadolle
David Evins
Jacques Fath
Gladys Geissman (Merry Hull)

=== 1950-1959 ===
- 1950

Bonnie Cashin
Fleur Meyer
Gloria Swanson
Pauline Trigère

- 1951

Ernestine Cannon
Jane Derby
Jacques Lesur
Michelle Murphy
Ben Zuckerman

- 1952

Roger Fare
Anne Fogarty
Vincent Monte-Sano
Dolores del Río

- 1953

Olga di Grésy
Charles James
Gilbert & Helen Orcel
Ben Sommers

- 1954

James Galanos
Herbert & Beth Levine
Emilio Pucci

- 1955

Pierre Balmain
Henry Dreyfuss
Florence Eiseman
Grace Kelly
Sally Kirkland
Vera Maxwell

- 1956

Cecil Beaton
Marie-Louise Bousquet
Giuliana Camerino

- 1957

Coco Chanel

- 1958

Helen Lee
Jens Harald Quistgaard
Yves Saint Laurent

- 1959

Emme
Piero Fornasetti
Rosalind Russell
Arnold Scaasi

=== 1960-1969 ===
- 1960

Sylvia Pedlar
Roger Jean-Pierre
Dinah Shore
Edward Burke Smith
Claude Staron

- 1961

Greer Garson
Harry Rolnick
Ferdinando Sarmi
Roger Vivier
Sydney Wragge

- 1962

Jules-François Crahay
James Laver
Estée Lauder
Sports Illustrated

- 1963

Georges Braque
Bud Kilpatrick
Margaret Clarke Miller
Maurice Tumarkin

- 1964–1965

The awards for 1964 and 1965 were combined into one award for the two years

Geoffrey Beene
Mr & Mrs. Arthur Edelman
Tzaims Luksus

- 1966

Mary Brosnan
Hélène Gordon-Lazareff
Lucie Ann Onderwyzer
Mila Schön
Jacques Tiffeau

- 1967

Valentino
Fiamma Ferragamo
The Artisans of Florence
Giancarlo Venturini
Lydia de Roma

- 1968

Oscar de la Renta
Kenneth Jay Lane
Armi Ratia
Roland Jourdan

- 1969

Bill Blass
Anne Klein
Bernard Kayman
Emanuel Ungaro
Gloria Vanderbilt

=== 1970-1995 ===
- 1973

Ralph Lauren
Levi Strauss & Co
Hanae Mori
Missoni
Jean Muir

- 1979

Giorgio Armani
Richard Avedon
Baccarat
Perry Ellis
Mary McFadden

- 1980

Karl Lagerfeld
Judith Leiber

- 1984

Jack Lenor Larsen
Issey Miyake

- 1995

Jean-Paul Goude
Stanley Marcus
Grace Mirabella
Miuccia Prada

== See also ==
- List of fashion awards
