= Silence cloth =

Pad laid under a tablecloth

Silence cloth is a heavy cotton fabric that is napped from both sides. It is a pad (as of flannel or felt) that is laid under the tablecloth on the dining table to quiet or prevent the clatter of dishes against the table.

== Use ==
Silence cloth works as padding or a liner underneath the tablecloth. Silence cloth helps make the table silent, cushioning soft, luxurious, and formal, more presentable. It stops the dishes' noise, and it also protects the table from scratches caused by plates and cutlery.

== See also ==
- Tablecloth
