= Placemat =

Ornamental covering or mat used in table setting

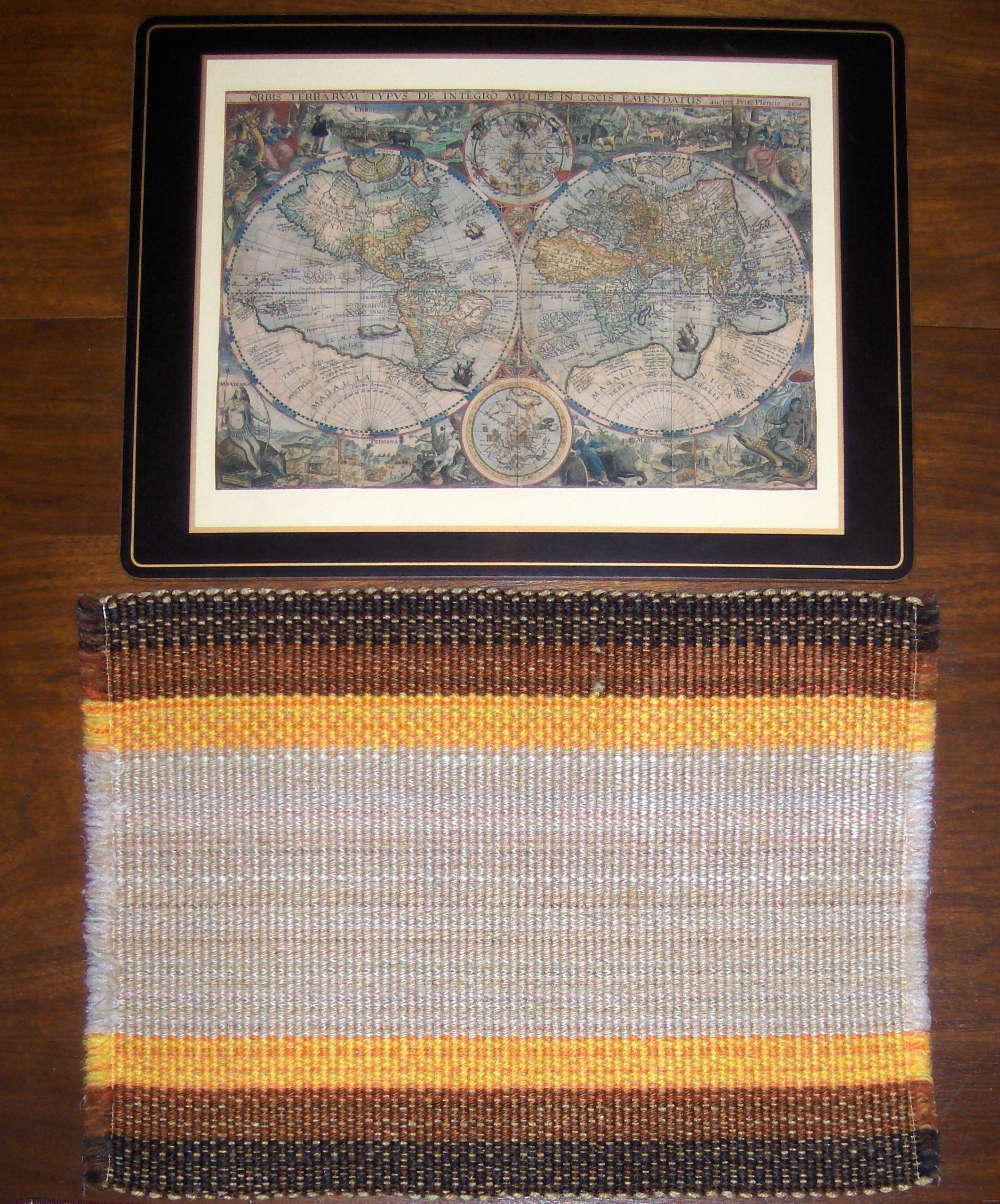
Two household placemats, made with cork (top, Plancius's map) and wool (bottom)

A placemat or table mat is a covering or pad designating an individual place setting, unlike the larger tablecloth that covers the entire surface. Placemats are made from many different materials, depending on their purpose: to protect, decorate, entertain or advertise. Materials and production methods range from mass-produced and commercial, to local and traditional.

== Uses ==
Their primary function is to protect the dinner table from water marks, food stains or heat damage. They also serve as decoration, especially placemats made from lace or silk. In restaurants, they can be used to advertise menu items, specials, local businesses or games for children. If the mat is cotton, it can absorb water and other liquids, such as spilt drinks.

== See also ==
- Tablecloth
- Doily
- Drink coaster
- Marghab Linens – a mid-20th-century company historically renowned for fine-quality table linen
- Neatnik Saucer
- The Dinner Party – an artwork depicting unique dinner place settings for a group of notable women from history
