= Lydia de Crescenzo =

Italian fashion designer

Lydia de Crescenzo (8 Jun 1918–1988) was an Italian fashion designer known as Lydia de Roma (Lydia of Rome), specializing in sportswear.

== Biography ==
de Crescenzo was born in Buenos Aires and grew up in Paris. Her father, who worked in the fashion industry as a buyer, came to Italy just before World War II and opened a shop for imported goods, with the assistance of his daughter as a designer. After the War, there was no ability to import goods, resources were low, and their business was in danger, which inspired de Crescenzo to make clothing out of unwanted trousseau sheets and tablecloths, and even mattress ticking, incorporating the embroidery already on the linens. de Crescenzo told Marcia Corbino of the Sarasota Journal, that when she started out in business, it was very difficult for professional women in Italy to be taken seriously; and that clever businesswomen were distrusted.

She launched the Lydia de Roma business in 1961. By 1962 Lydia de Roma clothing was being retailed by Neiman Marcus and becoming known for its sophisticated use of Italian fabrics and needlework. Marjorie Griswold, the influential buyer for Lord & Taylor who had introduced Emilio Pucci and Claire McCardell among others to the department store's clientele, noted Lydia de Roma as one of her recent discoveries in 1964. de Crescenzo's distinctive embroidered motifs were drawn from various sources, such as 16th century flower designs from Heinrich Cornelius Agrippa's Strange Medical Gallery.

By 1977, de Crescenzo's two daughters, Nicoletta and Rossella, had joined her in business, helping her design. Nicoletta had already had designing success as Nicoletta of Rome, creating clothing to be manufactured by Montgomery Ward and sold through their Brentshire Designers line in 1966, as well as having her work presented alongside her mother's. In 1977 Lydia de Crescenzo was still working to the cottage industry principle, employing home-workers to embroider and sew her work, including women whose husbands would not allow them to work away from home and young convent students.

== Awards ==
- 1967: Neiman Marcus Fashion Award for producing "Italy's finest hand-embroidered play clothes."
