= Maurice Tumarkin =

American menswear designer

Maurice Tumarkin (1900–1972) was an American menswear designer.

Tumarkin joined the Charles Baker Company (later Baker Clothes Inc.) in Philadelphia, after spending three years studying medicine. After the owner died, he took control of it and for 40 years until his retirement in 1970, was president of the company, which he brought to New York as well as Philadelphia. In 1963 he won the Neiman Marcus Fashion Award, and in 1959, the Italian government awarded him an Order of the Star of Italian Solidarity to thank him for helping revive the Italian silk industry. Also in 1959, he won one of his four Caswell-Massey awards for "excellence of design."

He married Carolyn Kunst and they had two children. Tumarkin died on 23 June 1972, aged 72, at the Harkness Pavilion.
