= Benjamin King (author) =

American author and military historian

- Born: 1944 (age 81–82)
- Military career
- Allegiance: United States of America
- Branch: United States Army
- Service years: 1965–1977
- Conflicts: Vietnam War
- Awards: Air Medal; Bronze Star ("V"); Purple Heart

Benjamin King (also B. D. King; born 1944) is an American author, military historian and noted war gamer. He served as a Field Artillery officer during the Vietnam War and later served as an historian for the US Army. He is best known for his historical novels A Bullet for Stonewall and A Bullet for Lincoln.

== Military service ==
Born in New Haven, Connecticut, Benjamin King earned a Bachelor of Arts in history from the University of Connecticut. In 1965, he was commissioned as a Field Artillery officer in the US Army and assigned to 1st Battalion, 81st Field Artillery Regiment (Pershing), which he recognized the Pershing missile’s similarity to the German V-2 rocket. Consequently he wrote a paper on the V-2 during the captains’ career course after his return from Vietnam, which he later turned into an article for the ‘’Field Artillery Journal’’ and later expanded into a book. After his assignment in Germany, he commanded both a 105mm artillery and headquarters battery in 2nd Battalion, 319th Field Artillery Regiment of the 101st Airborne Division during the Vietnam War from 1969 to 1970 where he was awarded the Air Medal, a Bronze Star Medal for valor and a Purple Heart Medal.

== Writings ==
After leaving the Army in 1977, King aspired to write short stories, but upon reading a book about Stonewall Jackson during the Battle of Chancellorsville in preparation for a battlefield staff ride, he asked the question, “What if he was murdered?” Three months later he finished his first novel, A Bullet for Stonewall, published by Pelican Publishing Company in 1990. He followed up this thriller with a twist on another assassination, A Bullet for Lincoln, published by Pelican in 1993. In this murder mystery, King explored the possibility of John Wilkes Booth being the scapegoat of an elaborate conspiracy “with enough probability to hold the attention of the most accuracy-minded Civil War buffs.” His third alternative history thriller, The Loki Project, was published in 2000, where he considered what would have happened if the Germans had built the atomic bomb.

== War Gaming ==
His interest in war gaming began as a child playing with toy metal soldiers when he found H. G. Wells' "Little Wars", the first book on war gaming rules. He next discovered Donald Featherstone’s rules and eventually wrote his own rules in 1965, which required a detailed knowledge of military history. He published his first rules in 1967 followed by many more after that.

This interest led to a job with the US Army as the Chief of Simulations in the Army Transportation School in 1984 where he designed the simulations, TRANSWAR III, Theater Deployment in the AirLand Battle and TRANSWAR IV, Truck Company Operations in the AirLand Battle.

== Historian ==
His professional career as an historian initially started as a contract historian for the Casemate Museum at Fort Monroe from 1978 to 1979. Recognizing his extensive knowledge of military history and ability to write books, the US Army Transportation Corps then hired King as their Command Historian in 1992 specifically to write the branch history with the assistance of Richard C. Biggs and Captain Eric R. Criner. The Army subsequently published Spearhead of Logistics, A History of the U.S. Army Transportation Corps in 1994. It was the second branch history published by any Army historian and was later republished by the Center of Military History in 2001. Inspired by the inaccurate claim that the V-2 was ineffective, he teamed up with Timothy J. Kutta to write Impact, the History of Germany’s V-Weapons in World War II, published by Sarpedon Press in 1998. Roland Green hailed it as "an outstanding revisionist history of Germany's famous rocket weapons." In 1999, King moved up to the US Army Training and Doctrine Command History Office where he wrote nine annual history reports and Victory Starts Here, A 35 Year History of U.S. Army Training and Doctrine Command, published by Combat Studies Institute Press in 2008, and followed up with the 40-year history also published by Combat Studies Institute Press in 2013.

He retired from the federal service in 2013 and focuses on writing, painting miniature soldiers and war gaming.

== Awards and decorations ==
- Air Medal
- Bronze Star ("V")
- Purple Heart

== Bibliography ==
- A Bullet for Stonewall, Pelican Publishing Company, 1990
- A Bullet for Lincoln, Pelican Publishing Company, 1993
- Spearhead of Logistics; A History of the U.S. Army Transportation Corps, U.S. Army Transportation Center, 1994, and Center of Military History, 2001, with Richard C. Biggs, and Eric R. Criner
- The Loki Project, Pelican Publishing Company, 2000
- Impact, The History of Germany's V-Weapons in World War II, Sarpedon Press 1998, DeCapo Press 2003 with Timothy J. Kuta
- Victory Starts Here; A Short 35-Year History of the US Army Training and Doctrine Command, Combat Studies Institute Press, 2008
- Victory Starts Here; A Short 40-Year History of the US Army Training and Doctrine Command, Combat Studies Institute Press, 2013,
- The Gruenwald Deception, Booklocker, 2015
- The Card, Booklocker, 2016
- The Fief of Central Park, Booklocker, 2016
