= Ernestine Cannon =

American ceramicist (1904–1969)

- Born: 1904
- Died: 1969 (aged 64–65)
- Known for: Ceramics

Ernestine Cannon (1904-1969), also known as Ernestine Virden-Cannon, was an American ceramicist and designer of dinner ware whose business, Ernestine, was based in Italy. Cannon lived in Salerno during the Second World War, where in 1948 she established her business in response to the post-war poverty she saw there. In 1949 the earthenware produced to Cannon's designs was featured at a Pittsburgh trade show by her exclusive representatives Fisher, Bruce & Co, bringing wider attention to her work and leading to its sale through department stores such as Neiman Marcus. In 1951 Cannon was awarded a Neiman Marcus Fashion Award, the reason given that her "creative designs" had "brought new life to the ceramic industry of Italy."

Examples of Cannon's ceramics are housed in the Dallas Museum of Art.
