= Ben King (designer) =

American fashion designer

- Years active: 1940s–1970s
- Known for: Accessories (belts, handbags, scarves)
- Awards: Neiman Marcus Fashion Award (1944)

Ben King was an American fashion designer active from the 1940s to the 1970s. In 1944, he was awarded a Neiman Marcus Fashion Award for Distinguished Service in the Field of Fashion. Although he produced some clothing, including a vibrant India-print pajamas ensemble in 1954, King was known particularly for accessories, being listed as a leading designer of belts in 1953. Ben King handbags were still available from stores such as Bonwit Teller in the mid-1970s, being featured in Vogue and Harper's Bazaar.
