= Magic tablecloth =

Fictional item that creates food

Magic tablecloth is a magic item in fairy tales of several countries that conjures various food and meals when rolled out. It is listed in Thompson's motif-index as D1472. The fairy tales where the tablecloth appears include Russian tales about Ivan Tsarevich, Italian The Shepherd Who Made the King's Daughter Laugh, Bohemian Story of Büsmanda, etc.

In some Russian tales the tablecloth also protects from danger. In one tale about Ivan Tsarevich, a forest monster threatens to eat him, but with a single flick of the wrist Ivan regales the monster with a lavish meal. The monster eats and drinks so much that he falls asleep and Ivan is saved.

In the Soviet Union, after temporary suppression of fairy tales in the late 1920s as a form of subversive literature, Russian poet Ilya Selvinsky bemoaned: "Cinderella won’t drop her shoe here again, we won’t eat from the magic tablecloth".
