= Tina Leser =

American fashion designer

Tina Leser (December 12, 1910 – January 23, 1986) was an American fashion designer. Part of a generation of pioneering sportswear designers, Leser was particularly known for her global influences.

== Personal life ==
Tina Leser was born Christine Buffington. Her birth parents were Mary Edith Cox and Charles Buffington. Cox arranged Leser's adoption by her cousin Georgine Wetherill Shillard-Smith after she and her husband, Charles Shillard-Smith, spent months wintering in California. Her name became Christine Wetherill Shillard-Smith in Philadelphia. She studied art at the Pennsylvania Academy of the Fine Arts, the Pennsylvania Museum School of Industrial Art in Philadelphia, and the Sorbonne in Paris. Leser made her debut in Philadelphia in 1929.

Tina married marine biologist Curtis Leser in November 1931 and the couple moved to Honolulu, where Curtis worked for the Academy of Science. Tina took up spearfishing and diving with Hawaiian locals. In 1936, the Lesers divorced, but Tina decided to keep Leser as her professional name for the remainder of her career.

In 1948, Tina Leser married James J. Howley (1920-2012). The couple had one daughter. In 1949, Leser and Howley took a round the world honeymoon that helped to develop Leser's international aesthetic. In 1982, the Long Island home of Leser and Howey was burglarized. Two million dollars' worth of art and silver were stolen, including a Picasso and a Monet. The thieves were caught.

Leser's mother, Georgine Shillard-Smith, founded the Gulf Coast Art Center. Leser was president of the organization from 1952 to 1954. The Gulf Coast Art Center closed in 2009.

== Career ==
Leser opened a speciality store in Honolulu in 1935 called Tina Leser Gowns, located across the street from the Royal Hawaiian Hotel. Until it closed in 1942, the store sold resort wear, primarily playsuits and coverups, designed by Leser that she created with the help of a French dressmaker. Fabrics used included sailcloth, Hawaiian and Filipino fabrics. Her client base included celebrities such as The Dolly Sisters and Joan Crawford. The exposition allowed her to sell her designs to department stores Bonwit Teller and Saks Fifth Avenue. After the Attack on Pearl Harbor, she was required to close the shop and leave the island.

Encouraged by Edna Woolman Chase and Carmel Snow, Leser met with buyers at Saks Fifth Avenue who purchased 500 playsuits from Leser. Leser briefly ran her own company in New York from 1941 to 1943. Her 1941 collections included Hawaiian palaka fabric, hand-painted fabric, and menswear. At that time, her business was headquartered at 1 West 47th Street in Manhattan. A 1941 article describes her salon as having "hand-painted satin drapes and sea-shell chairs."

From 1942 to 1952, Leser designed for the Edwin H. Foreman sportswear company. While working with Edwin H. Foreman, Leser introduced harem pants, dhoti pants, and toreador pants as "at home" clothing for American women.

In 1952, Leser again founded her own company, Tina Leser Inc., which she headed until her retirement in 1964. The headquarters were at 550 7th Avenue in Manhattan. During this phase in her career, Leser promoted hand painted Hawaiian print, sarong-type play clothes, and cashmere dresses.

From 1949 to 1953, Leser organized the Tina Leser prize for Japanese designers.

Leser's celebrity clients included Joan Crawford, Joan Fontaine, Paulette Goddard, Audrey Hepburn, and Kim Novak. Leser designed costumes for the 1950 film Born to be Bad. Star Joan Fontaine said "the only acceptable art of the film was my wardrobe designed by Tina Leser." Leser also designed the costumes for the 1946 Broadway musical Park Avenue.

Tina Leser died on January 23, 1986.

== Legacy ==
Liz Claiborne's began her career as a model and sketch artist for Tina Leser. From Leser, Clairborne learned "that being a designer meant hard, long, interminably long hours of work..."

Tina Leser's work is held by the Metropolitan Museum of Art, Museum of Fine Arts in Boston, Philadelphia Museum of Art, Phoenix Art Museum, and Kent State University Museum,

== Awards ==
- Neiman Marcus Fashion Award, 1945
- Coty Award, 1945
- Outstanding Designer, Philadelphia Museum School of Art, 1955
- Sportswear Design Award, Sports Illustrated, 1956
