= Ben Tavera King =

Ben Tavera King (born 1952) is a Latin American musician, songwriter, recording artist, and performer from the United States. He has recorded various genres from Tex-Mex to new-age and is proficient on numerous stringed instruments including guitar, lute, and vihuela.

King received notice in the 1980s and early 1990s on public radio for his releases, many of which were issued on his own labels, Inner Ear Records, Talking Taco Music, and Iago Records. He has composed the music for several PBS programs including Heritage and Mujeres Con SIDA. The album entitled Themes Of Passion was composed as the soundtrack for the PBS special, Los Mineros.

His most commercially successful album was 1990's Coyote Moon which peaked at #5 on the Billboard World Music Albums chart.

== Discography ==
- 1980: Ben Tavera King - Manic Hispanic (Inner Ear)
- 1982: Frank Corrales, Ben Tavera King, And The Los Folkeros Group - Saturday Night San Antonio: Tex-Mex Dance Music (Folkways)
- 1983: Los Polkeros De Ben Tavera King - Border Bash: Tex-Mex Dance Music, Vol. 2 (Folkways)
- 1984: Ben Tavera King Y Los Jazztecs - Border Crossings: New Directions In Tex-Mex Music (Folkways)
- 1988: Ben Tavera King - Desert Dreams (Sony)
- 1990: Ben Tavera King - Coyote Moon (Global Pacific)
- 1992: Ben Tavera King - Visions & Encounters (Talking Taco)
- 1993: Ben Tavera King - Turquoise Trail (Talking Taco)
- 1994: Ben Tavera King - Themes Of Passion (Talking Taco)
- 1994: Ben Tavera King - Hunting Magic (Talking Taco)
- 2003: Ben Tavera King - Rio Grande Romeos (Talking Taco)
- 2007: Los Polkeros De Ben Tavera King - Down Home Saturday Night (Smithsonian Folkways)
- 2008: Ben Tavera King With The Native Flute Ensemble - Visions & Healing (Talking Taco)
