= Doily =

Ornamental fabric or paper

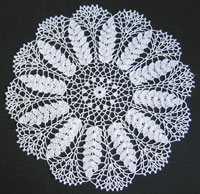
Representation of ears of ripe wheat used as a table linen

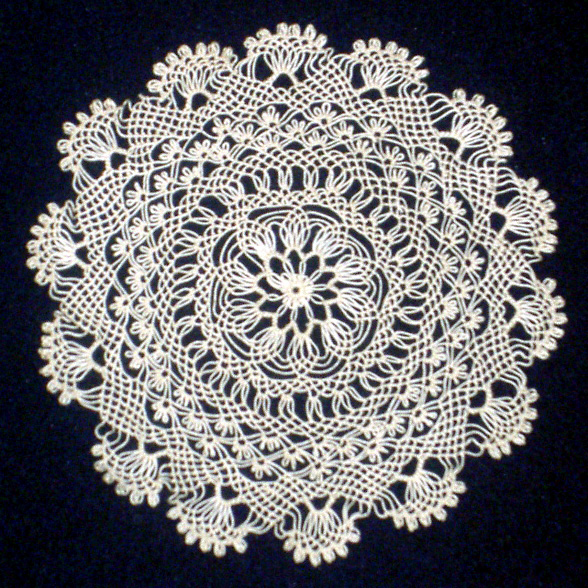
Armenian Needlelace

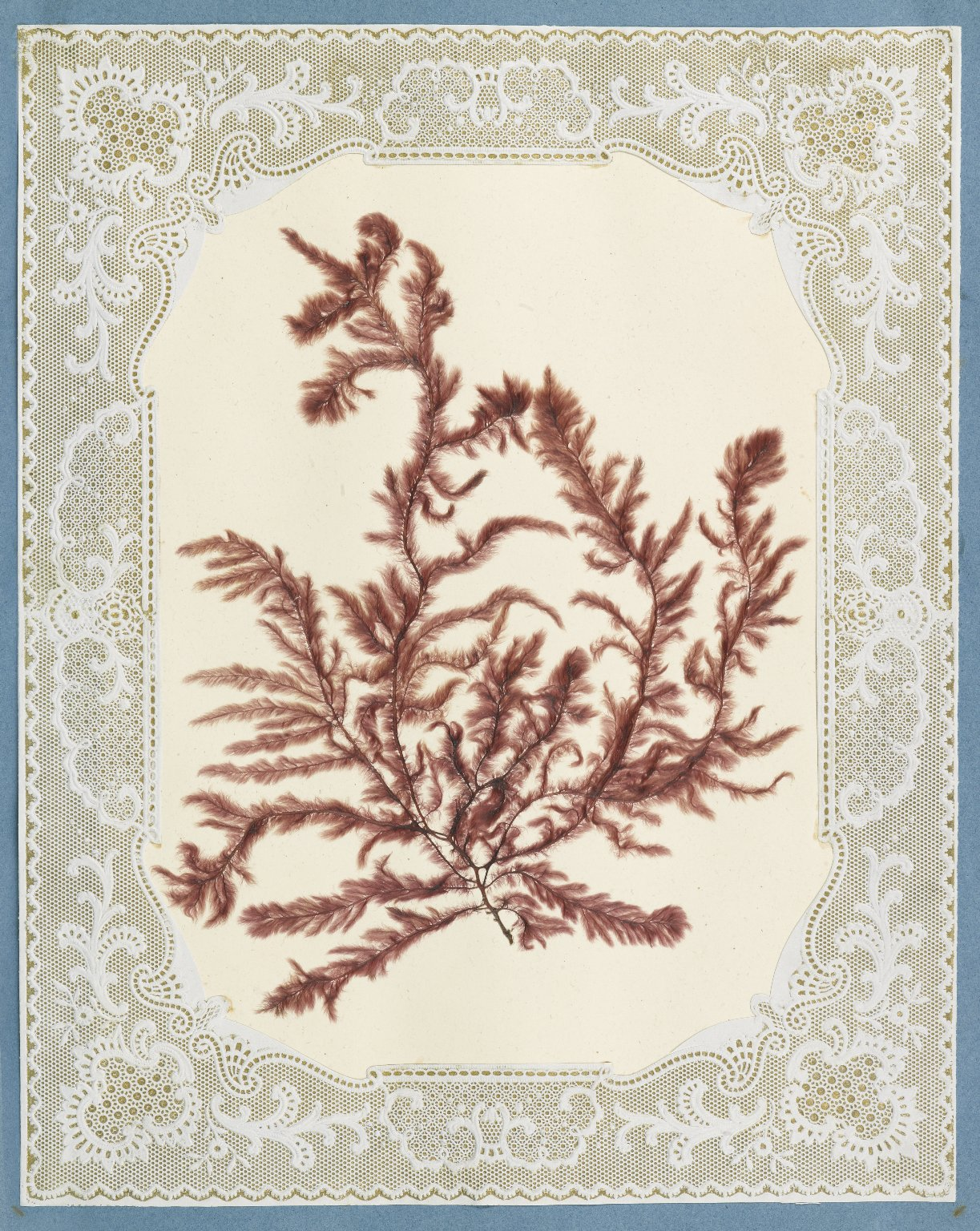
Eliza A. Jordson, Brooklyn L.I. 1848. Algae or seaweed specimen, pasted on colored construction paper, framed by paper lace doilies. Brooklyn Museum.

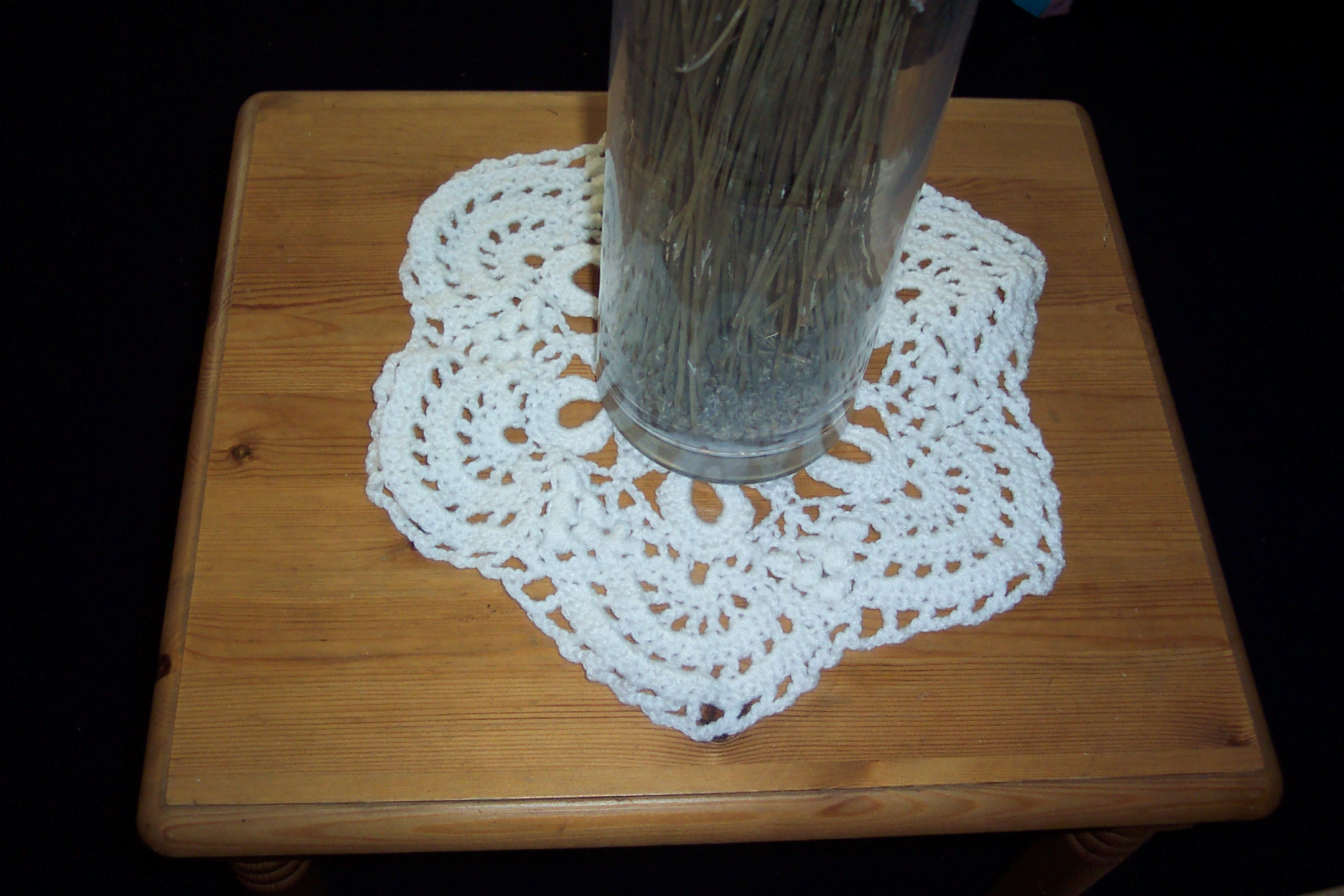
A crocheted doily in use

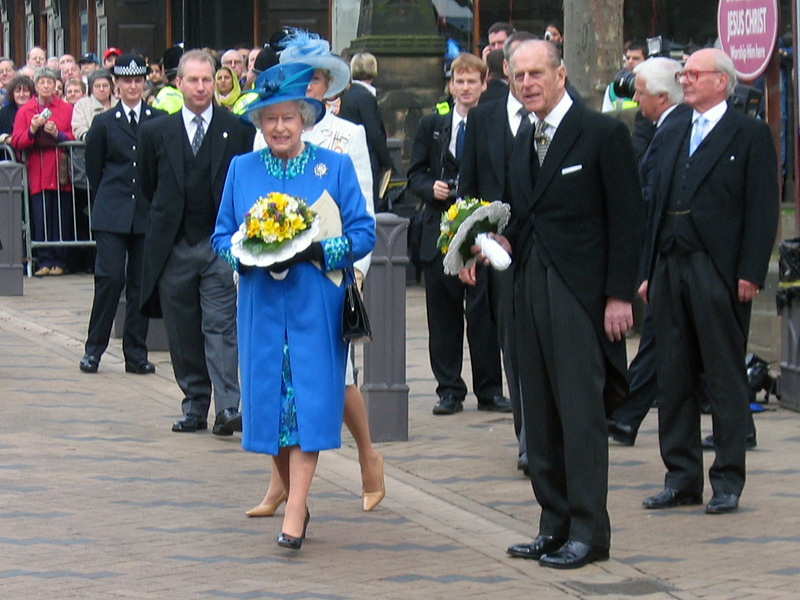
Queen Elizabeth II holds a doily-wrapped posy.

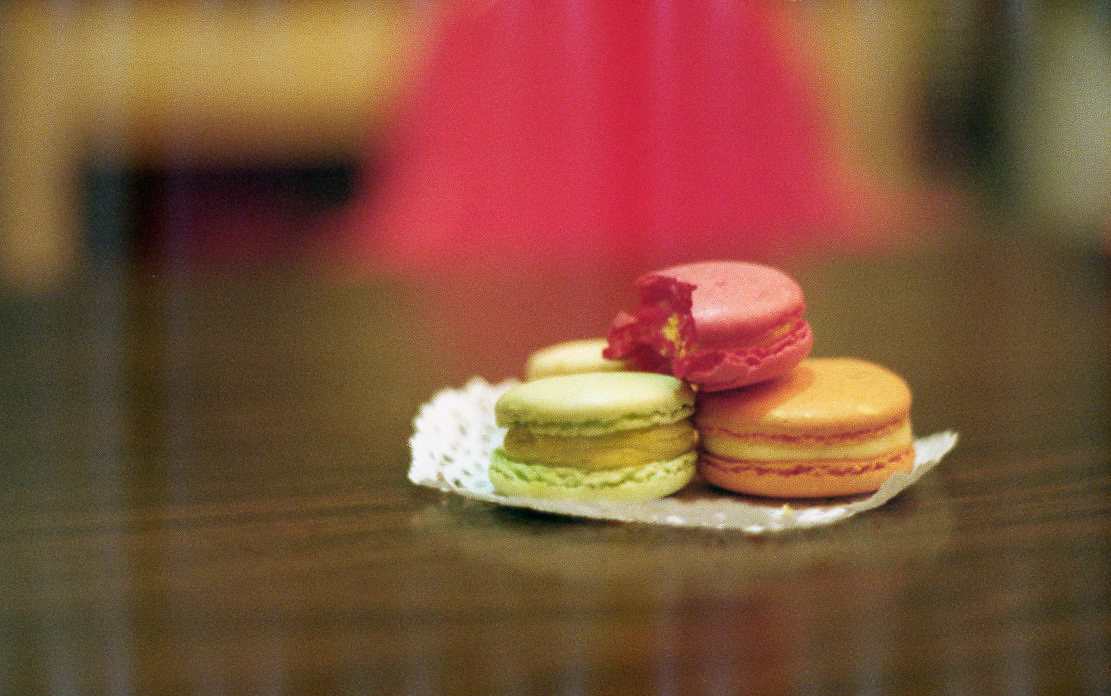
Macarons on a paper doily

A doily (also doiley, doilie, doyly, or doyley) is an ornamental mat, typically made of paper or fabric, and variously used for protecting surfaces or binding flowers, in food service presentation, or as a clothing ornamentation, as well as a head covering for Christian women. It is characterized by openwork, which allows the surface of the underlying object to show through.

Doilies can be constructed in a variety of techniques, and the doily motif can also be represented in atypical non-textile formats.

== Etymology ==
Doiley was a 17th-century London draper, who made popular "a woolen stuff, 'at once cheap and genteel', introduced for summer wear in the latter part of the 17th c." At the time, it was used as an adjective, as in "doily stuffs" or "doily suit". Later, usage shifted to refer to "a small ornamental napkin used at dessert", known as a "doily-napkin".

== Usage ==
=== Headcovering ===
The doily is worn as a headcovering for Jewish women as an alternative to the traditional tichel (headscarf).

The doily is used as a headcovering by many Christian women who wear them in obedience to 1 Corinthians 11:1–13, especially by Conservative Anabaptist Christian women, including certain Conservative Mennonite fellowships such as the Biblical Mennonite Alliance.

=== Furniture protection ===
In addition to their decorative function doilies have the practical role of protecting fine-wood furniture from the scratches caused by crockery or decorative objects such as nativity scenes, or from spilled tea when used on tea trays or with cups and saucers. When used to protect the backs and arms of chairs, they are serving as antimacassars.

=== Flower arrangement ===
Doilies are traditionally used to bind the stems in posies (formal flower arrangements called tussie-mussies in the Victorian Era).

=== Food service and etiquette ===
Doilies figure prominently in the custom of finger bowls, once common in formal, multi-course dinners. The linen doily (never paper) separates the dessert plate from the finger bowl. The custom requires that both doily and finger bowl are removed to the upper left of the place setting before briefly dipping fingertips into the water and drying them on the napkin. Failing to move both together is considered a faux pas.

Disposable paper doilies "were designed as a cheaper but respectable alternative to crocheted linen doilies" and are commonly used to decorate plates, placed under the food for ornamentation.

=== Backlash to disrespect for doily craftswomen ===
In response to a museum's diminishment of the work and value of women's textiles, scholar Elena Kanagy-Loux defended the artistry, value, and skill of the makers of doilies. Cultural doily work and motifs have been celebrated by contemporary artists, including public art pieces and shows. Collectors of doily textile art pieces find a wide range of styles and techniques are available.

== Techniques ==
They are crocheted, tatted or knitted out of cotton or linen thread. Many patterns for crocheting or knitting doilies were published by thread manufacturers in the first part of the 20th century. The designers were often uncredited. The designs could be circular or oval starting from the center and working outward, reminiscent of the polar coordinates system. Doilies, as well as other household items, may be made by crocheting rows on a grid pattern using a technique called filet crochet, similar to points on the cartesian coordinate system.

Contemporary designers continue to make patterns for modern hand craft enthusiasts. Although it may to some extent interfere with the original use, some doilies involve embroidery or have raised designs (rose petals, popcorn, or ruffles) rather than being flat.

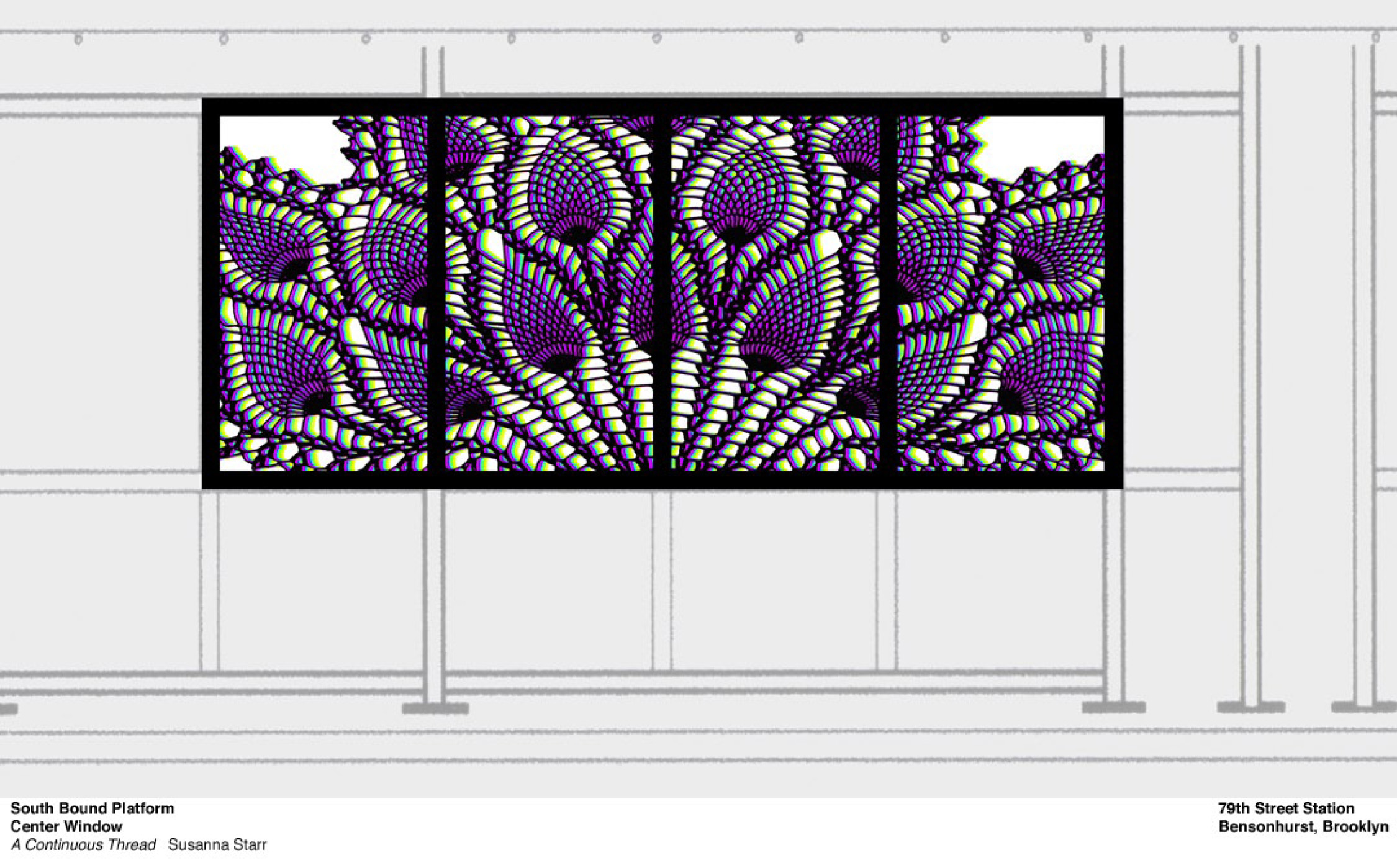
Italian-American doily representation in public art

== See also ==
- Antimacassar
- Armenian needlelace
- Koniaków Lace
- Lace
- Medallion knitting
- Mountmellick embroidery
- Openwork
- Placemat
- Tenerife lace
