= Medallion knitting =

Medallion knitting produces flat knitted fabrics that are circular or polygons using a technique similar to the crochet of doilies, by progressively increasing or decreasing the radius.

The most difficult part of flat medallion knitting is increasing or decreasing at just the right rate. The circumference $c$ of a circle is related to its radius $r$ by the formula $c=2\pi r$. Therefore, the number of stitches $n$ in a row at radius $r$ must exactly equal that circumference times the stitch gauge, if the medallion is to lie flat. If the number of stitches is fewer than this, the medallion will cup at its edges, forming a spherical bowl; if the number of stitches exceeds this, the medallion will frill at its edges, forming ruffles. Therefore, one should measure the radius regularly as the medallion is being knitted and determine the number of stitches that need to be increased or decreased in each round. These increases or decreases should be spread evenly around the circumference.

If the initial number of stitches were exactly correct and if every row were exactly the same height, flat medallions could be ensured by increasing or decreasing the same number of stitches $\Delta n$ in every row using the formula

$$\Delta n = 2\pi \frac{\mathrm{stitch\  gauge}}{\mathrm{row\  gauge}}$$

provided that $\Delta n$ were exactly an integer. This is impossible, since $\pi$ is irrational. Most medallion knitting patterns implicitly assume that this will work, e.g., "increase five stitches per round". However, the knitter's gauges may differ from those of the pattern-maker and may even change with the circumference, and $\Delta n$ is rarely an integer, so it is usually better to use the method outlined in the previous paragraph.

Here's one plan for knitting a disk: Start with 8 stitches in the first round. Assuming equal stitch heights, the circumference of the second round is roughly twice that of the first round so make one stitch into two stitches, i.e. increase every stitch. The circumference of the second round and third round are in the proportion 2:3 so make three stitches of two (i.e. do an increase after every two stitches. Fourth round to third round is in proportion 4:3 so increase after every third stitch and continue in this manner. You may wish to adjust things so that the increases aren't above each other. In practice a straight knit row is done between each of the rounds above (see Mary Thomas's Book of Knitting Patterns). If one begins with eight stitches the pattern above results in eight increases per two rows, or an average of four increases per row which is the "magic number" for flat circular knitting according to Daniel Yuhas in his book "Knitting from the Center Out".
