= Finger bowl =

Bowl of water for rinsing fingers during meals

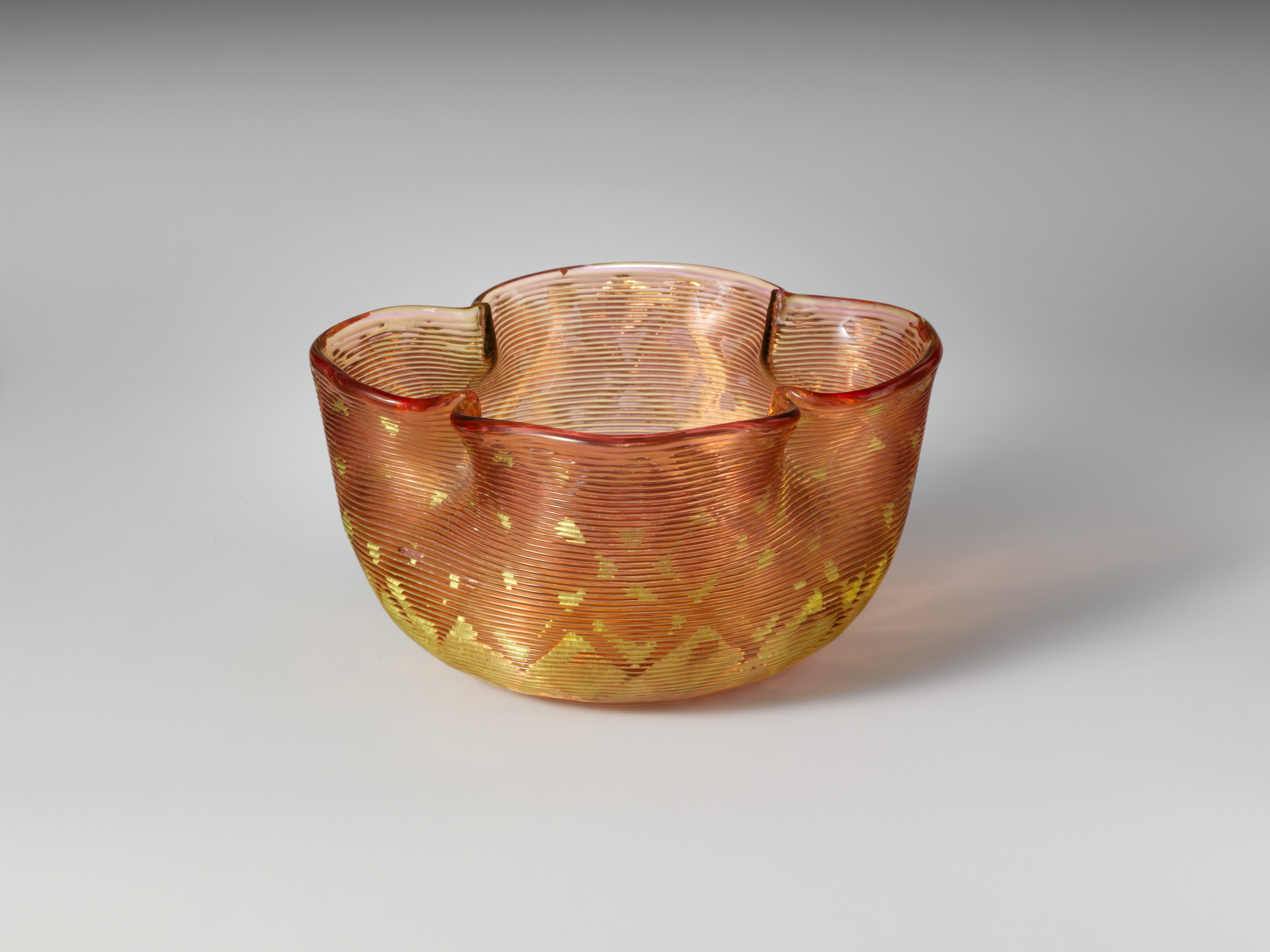
Finger bowl from the 1880s

A finger bowl is a bowl of water that dinner guests use for rinsing their fingers. In a formal meal, the finger bowl is brought to the table at the time of the dessert course of the meal, and guests set it aside for use after the last course, just before leaving the table. In less formal service, the finger bowl may be presented after any course that involves finger food and may even be presented after more than one such course in a single meal, however some people also count it as a complementary item.

== Formal service ==
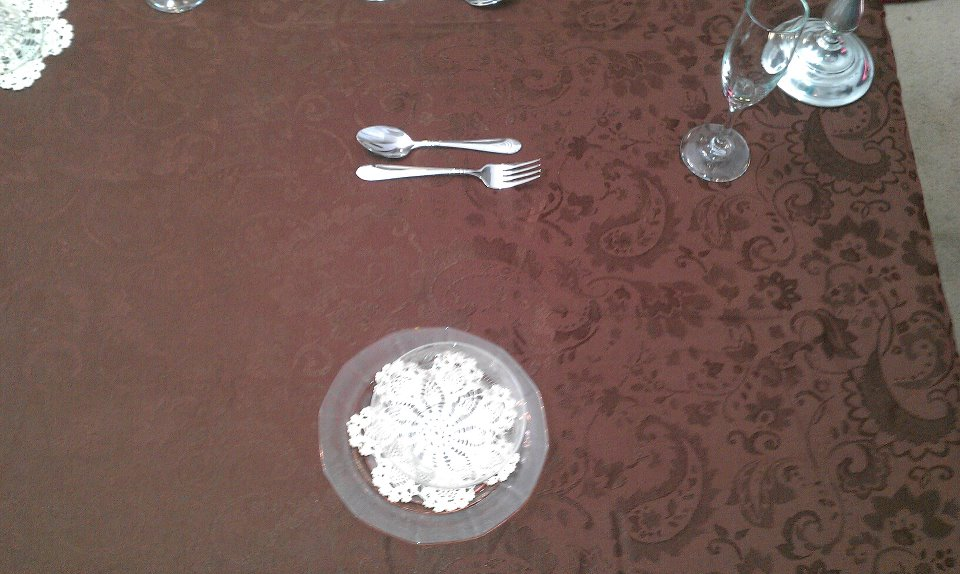
The finger bowl is typically delivered with the dessert plate.

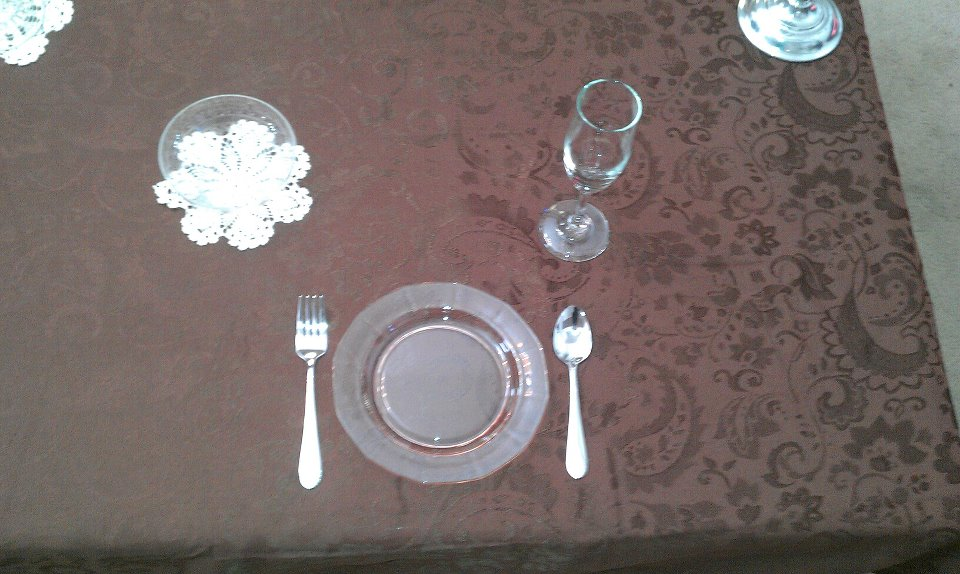
The finger bowl is moved to the upper left before dessert is served. After dessert, the guests dip their fingers into the bowl and dry them with their napkin.

In formal service, the finger bowl is most commonly brought to the table with the dessert plate; there is a linen doily under the bowl, and the dessert fork and spoon are placed on either side of the bowl. The arrangement of plates and flatware are set before each guest, who then move the flatware to the sides of the dessert plate, and move the finger bowl with the doily to the upper left of the plate. "This is the only time during a formal meal that a guest takes part in placing the appointments for a course".

If a separate fruit course follows dessert, the finger bowl is instead brought in with the fruit plate and fruit fork and knife, arranged as they would be on a dessert plate. Alternatively, a full array of dessert and fruit dishes can be brought out at once, with the finger bowl on top of the dessert plate with its fork and spoon, and the dessert plate on top of the fruit plate, with doilies between each dish; in this type of service, the fruit fork and knife are brought out after the dessert plates and silver are cleared.

After dessert (or after the fruit, if that forms the last course), guests lightly dip their fingertips into the water, one hand at a time, and then wipe them on the napkin in their lap.

In a very formal service, "where there are plenty of servants, the finger bowl may not come in on the fruit plate but may be brought on its own serving plate, replacing the used fruit plate before the guests leave the table for coffee."

Practices have varied by time and place. The bowl may be "less than half" or as much as "three-quarters" filled with water. A glass ornament, flower, flower petals, lemon slice, sprig of mint or other decoration is often floated in it; others advise against adding a slice of lemon. Some writers advise against using the finger bowl to wet the mouth; others allow it.

== Informal service ==
In high-end American restaurants of the early to mid-20th century, finger bowls were presented at the end of the meal. In chop houses and lobster palaces of the period, finger bowls were often presented after any course that included finger foods or drawn butter.

In some styles of informal and restaurant service and at very large gatherings, the dessert fork and spoon are set above the top edge of the plate at the start of the meal (a practice considered incorrect at dinner parties). In that style of service, near the end of the meal, the finger bowl is presented with the dessert plate, similar to formal service; and the guests set the bowl aside and move the fork and spoon to the sides of the plate for the dessert course. After dessert, the guests use the finger bowl before leaving the table.

In a form of service commonly seen in the early 21st century, guests use the finger bowl before dessert and fruit, rather than after. This innovation, possibly resulting from ignorance of correct usage, is of unknown and apparently recent origin.

Unfamiliarity with finger bowls has led to many common faux pas, including drinking the water, eating the flower, or failing to move the doily with the bowl when shifting it off of the dessert plate.

== Decline ==
The decline of the finger bowl in American restaurants began during the war effort during World War I when everyone was encouraged to minimize excess. Before that, "live music and finger bowls were two amenities put forward as competitive attractions over places that didn't have them." Despite the general decline in use, finger-bowl service continued at some venues well into the 20th century.

== See also ==
- Oshibori, a Japanese wet hand towel used to clean hands
- Wet wipe
