= Tenerife lace =

Needle lace from the Canary Islands

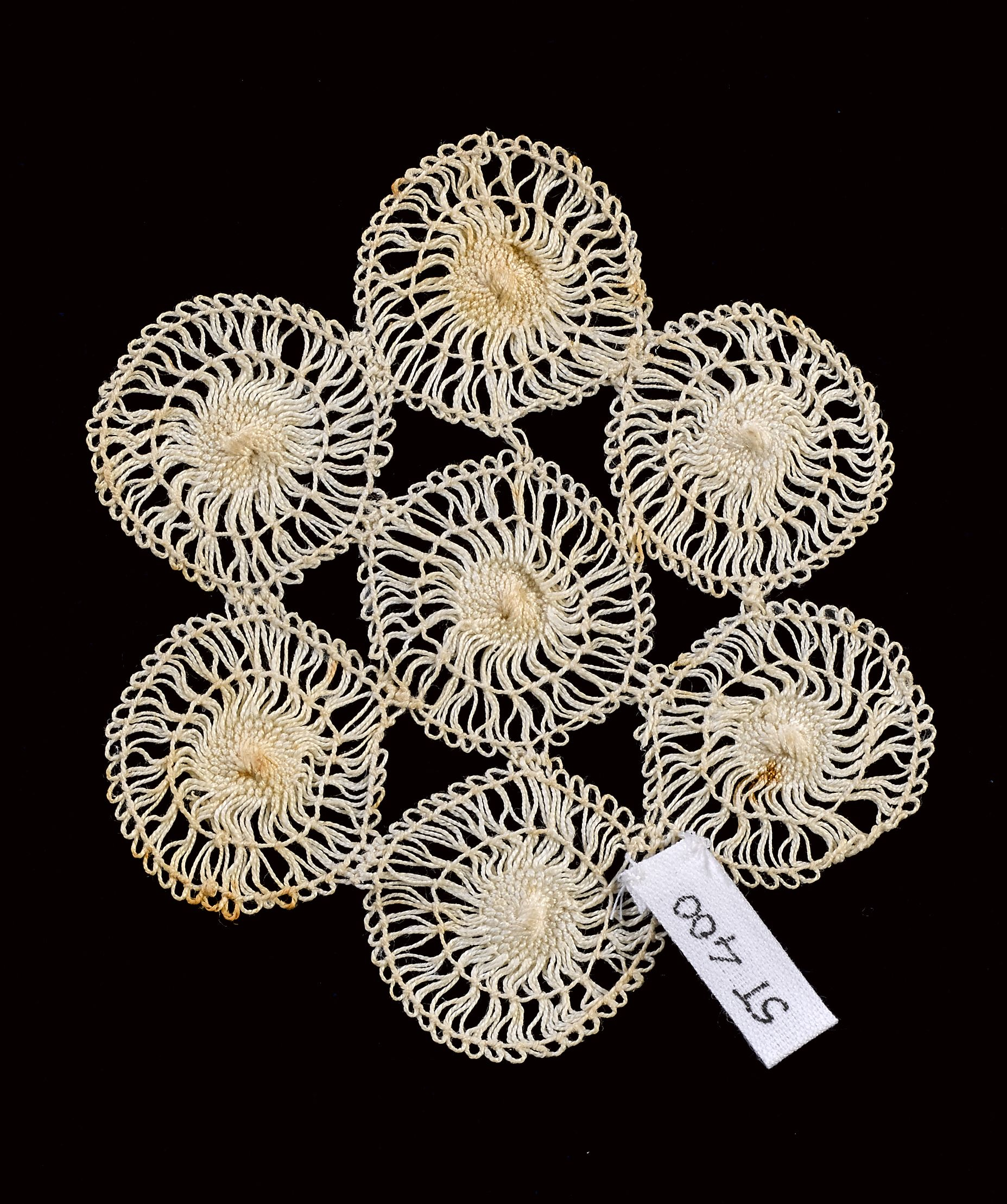
- Tenerife lace
- Type: Lace
- Production method: Needle lace
- Production process: Craft production
- Place of origin: Lanzarote and Tenerife, Spain

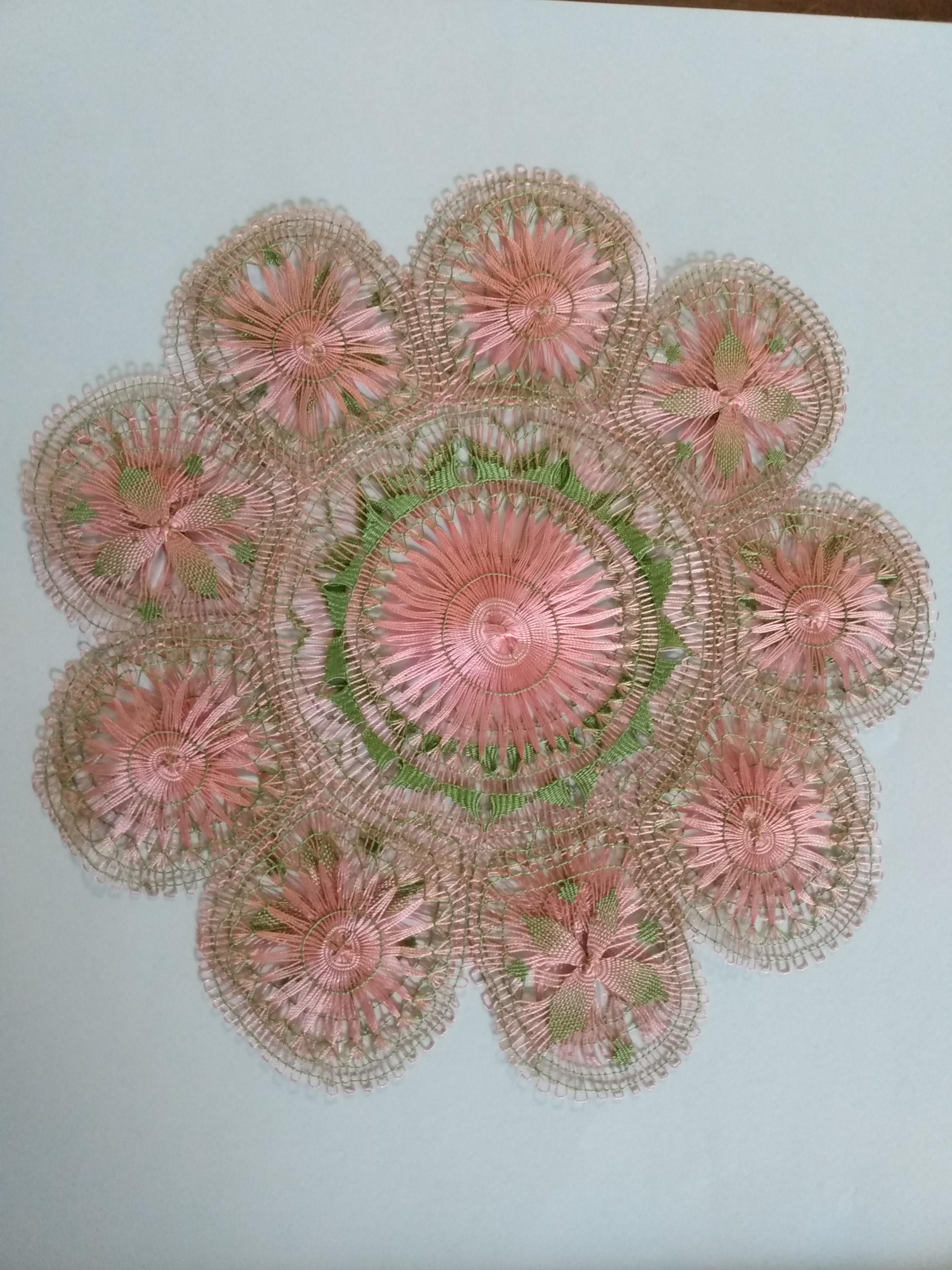
A pink and green silk Tenerife needle lace piece

Tenerife lace or "roseta canaria" is a needle lace style often found on the Canary Islands and sharing the name of the island of Tenerife. Despite its name the origin of this lace is uncertain, and in Tenerife it may be referred to as Brazilian lace.

== History ==
Tenerife (or Teneriffe) lace is a style of needle lace that evolved from earlier styles of cutwork lace that generated medallions and rounded motifs in fabric by cutting and stitching groups of threads in existing fabric pieces. A characteristic example of this kind of cutwork can be seen in a sampler by Sarah Thral from 1644. Because of the nature of the frequently rounded structure with angular radiations, it was reminiscent of the sun and also acquired the name "sol lace". Eventually, the fabric skeleton was eliminated and a framework of threads established with a supporting structure of pins was used to create the foundation for the lace, and needle techniques were used to create the designs.

17th century Spanish Sol lace was a form of drawn thread work with circular patterns built up on a skeleton of woven threads. It is believed that this skill was transported to South America with European colonization. The name Sol lace was retained in Bolivia, Brazil, and Peru. A variety of this technique from Puerto Rico is called Sol de Naranjito.

By the 19th century the way the lace was made had changed and there were differences between the methods used for the lace known as Tenerife in Spain and Ñandutí in Paraguay and other parts of South America. Examples of fragments, collars, handkerchiefs made in this style can be found in museums today.

In the early 20th century, women patented various devices to provide the framework for the structure of the threads, also referred to as hand looms. In 1901, Ada Sykes Dixon received a patent for her pin holder for lacework, which was assigned to William Briggs & Co Ltd. Augusta Proctor created one style described as a "Holder for Lacework" in 1903. An instruction book was also provided to accompany the Proctor wheel or square style rigid frames These items are now antique collectibles, and can sometimes be found available for purchase, such as these brass Briggs cushion version and plain examples. Similarly, Proctor square or circular samples can still be located.

Competing instruction books were published to help guide the crafter in the creation of various Teneriffe motifs and using different devices. The "Palma" style device advertised that no pins were required, and the handheld model had grooves for making the needle actions easier.

In the 1930s - 1940s Tenerife lace was sometimes called Polka Spider Web Lace.

In the 1950s, a Koppo Cushion style of lace pillow was devised and sold. This flexible and useful pillow style is still in use today, and can be recreated using instructions and descriptions in the patent guidelines.

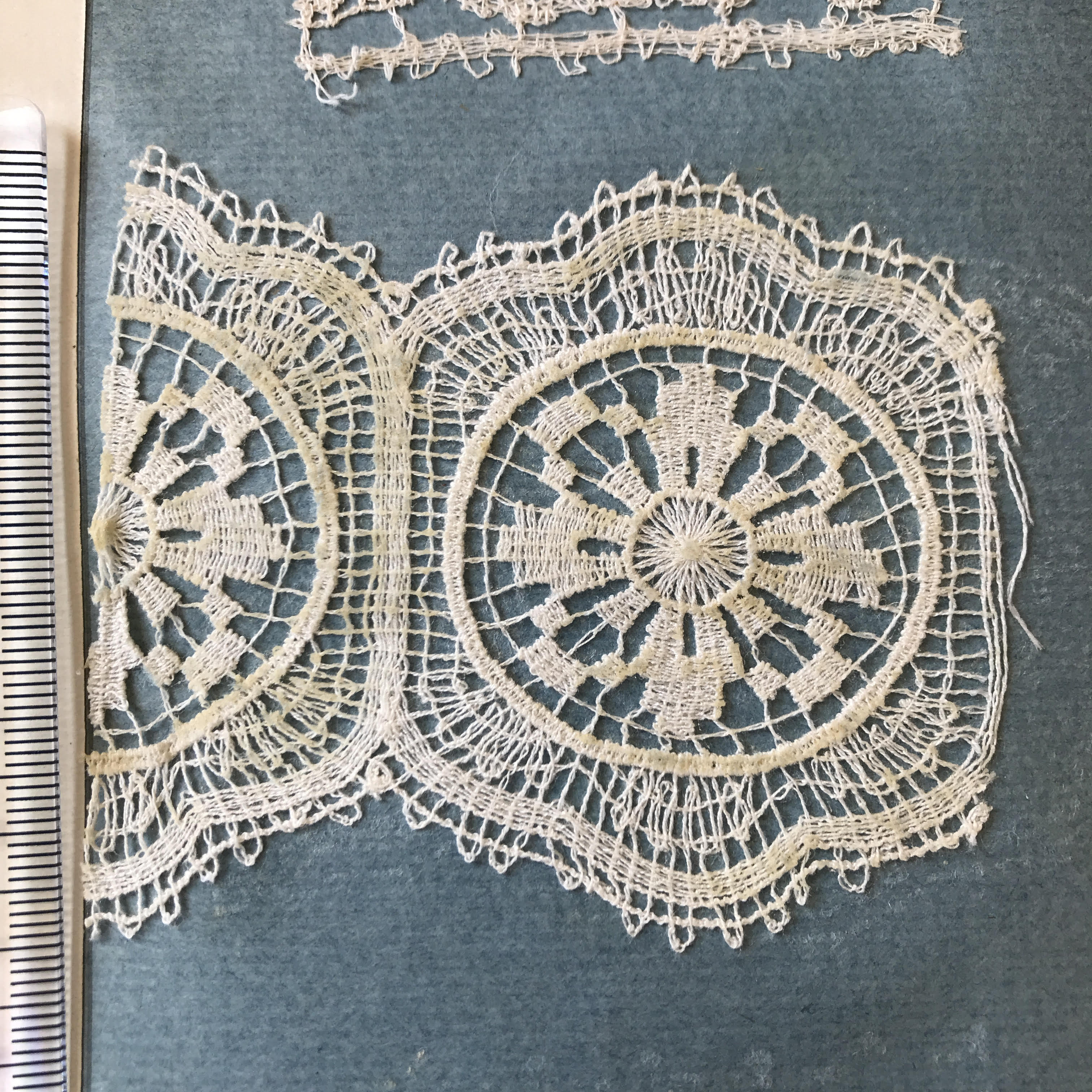
Sample of machine lace with Teneriffe lace motif

In the later 20th century, a revival of interest in the history and style of Teneriffe lace led to the publication of several works about this lace with historical details and patterns.

== How it is made ==
In Tenerife lace, the wheel-like motifs are made separately. The thread is first taken to-and-fro across the fabric-covered circular cards, blocks, or cushions around pins stuck around the edge. Once these radial threads are in place the pattern is woven in with a needle. The finished motif is released by removing the pins and the motifs are later sewn together.

Machine made chemical lace samples of popular lace styles also included Teneriffe lace motifs. An extant sample was probably made on a Schiffli embroidery machine, and comes from a reference book put together by The Midland Lace Company of Nottingham who made both Leavers (Nottingham) Lace and Embroidered Laces on huge machines. The reference book would have been used as inspiration for lace designers and contained a wide range of styles and techniques. The embroidery would have been worked on a sacrificial backing, which could have been removed either by the application of heat, chemicals or water depending on the material used.

== Gallery ==
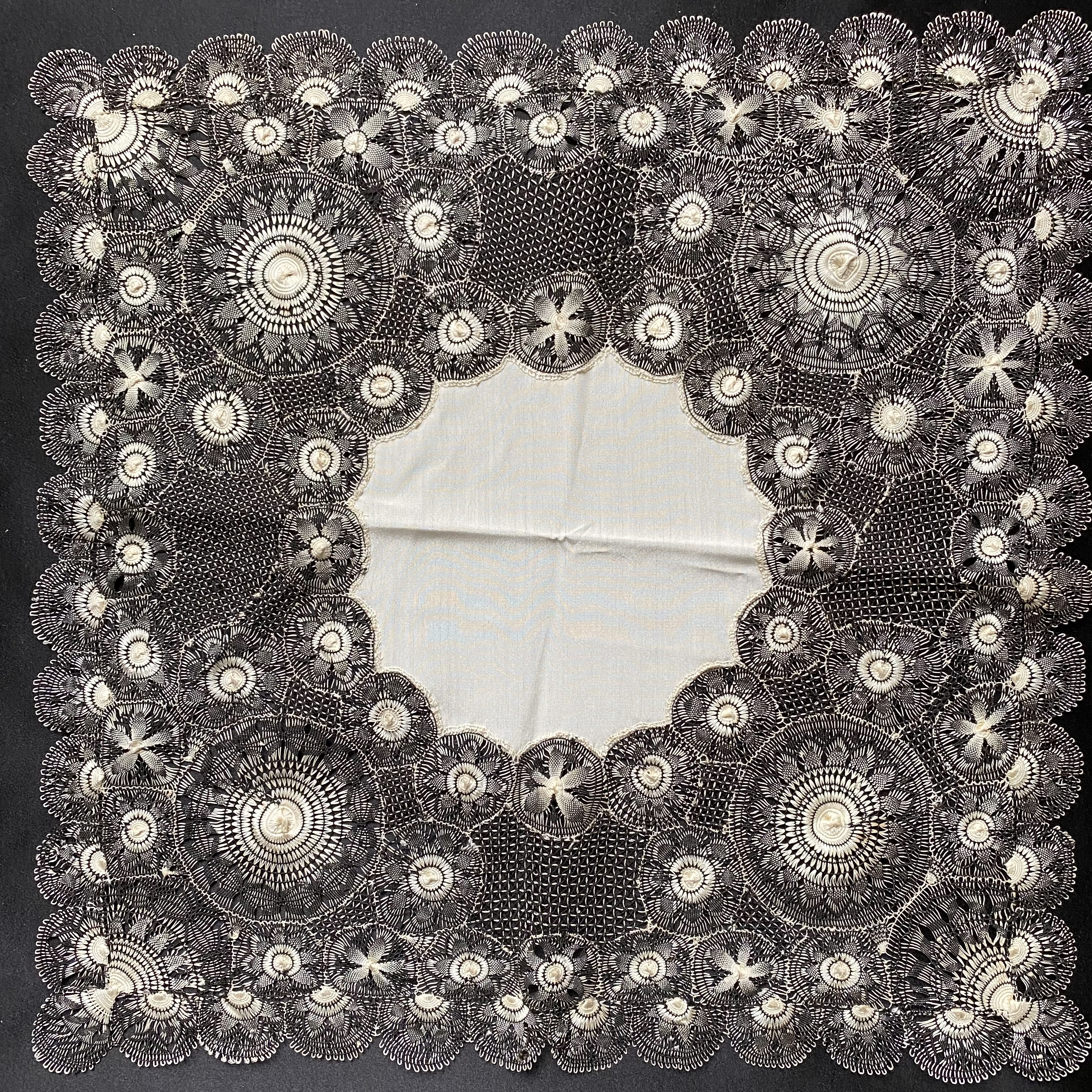

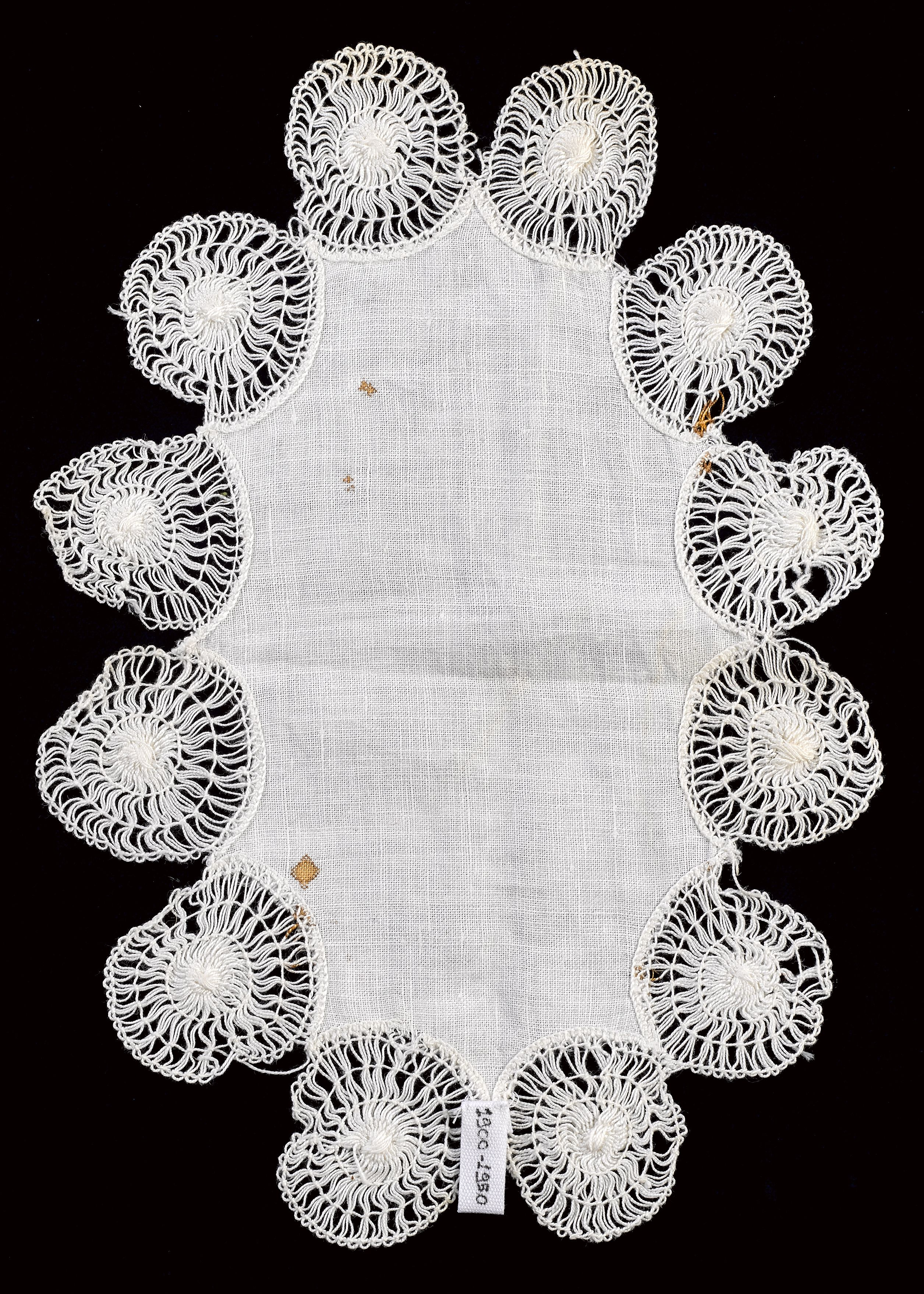

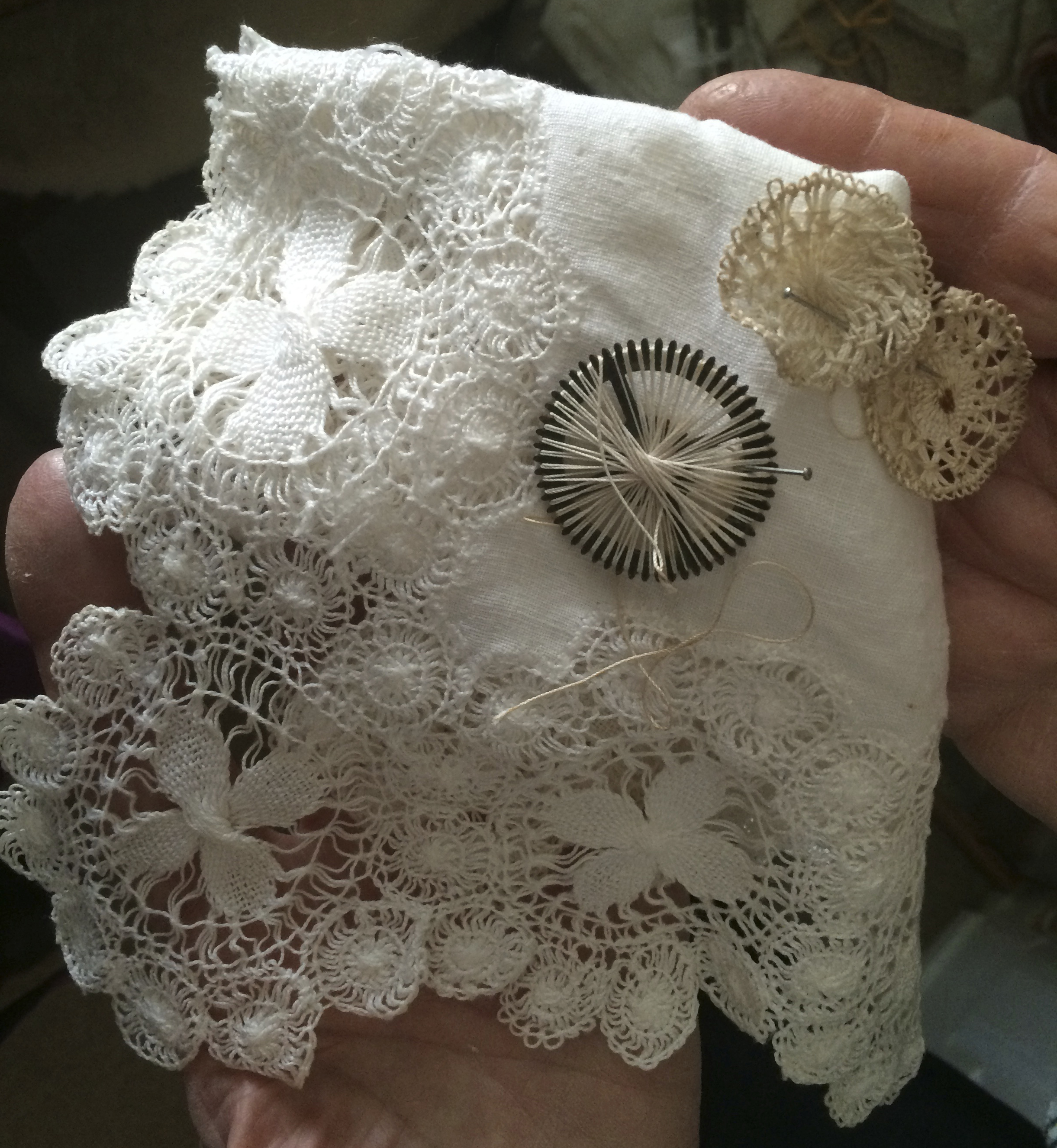

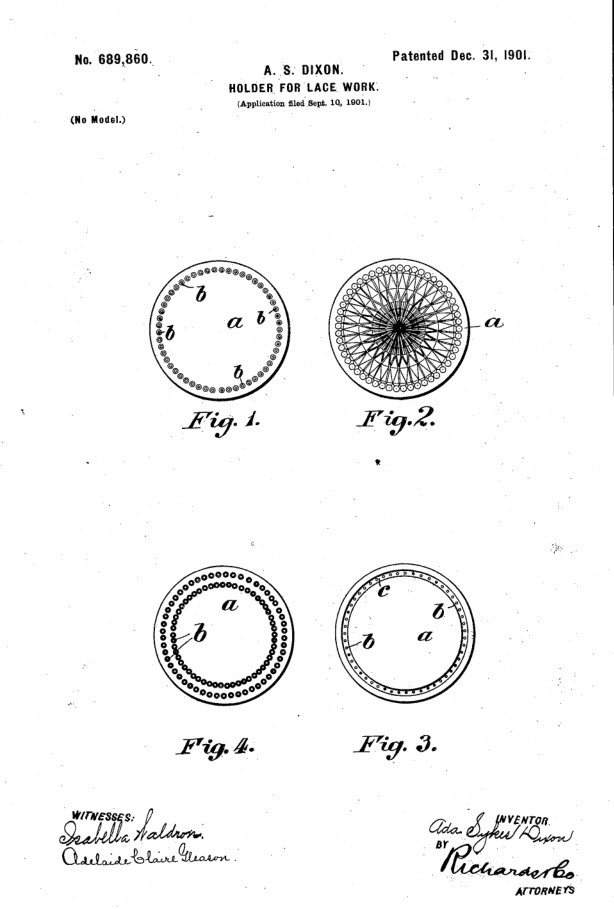

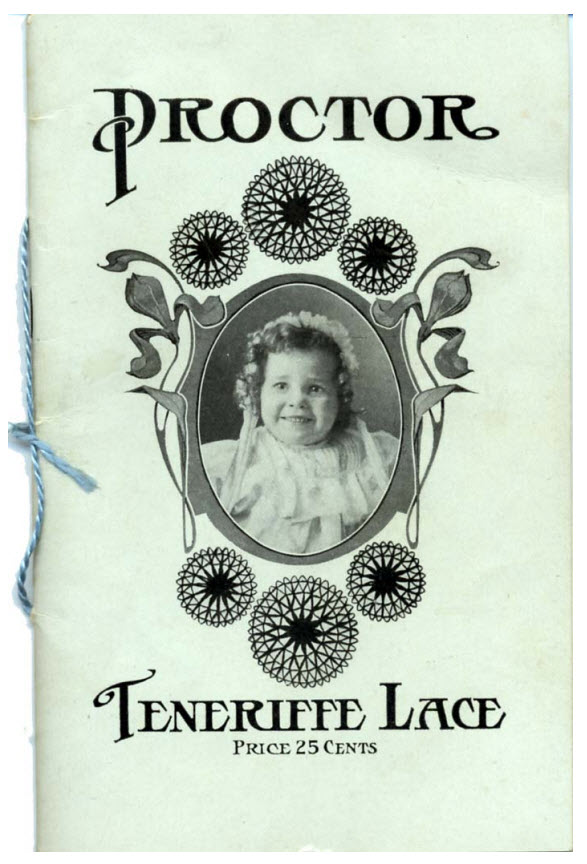

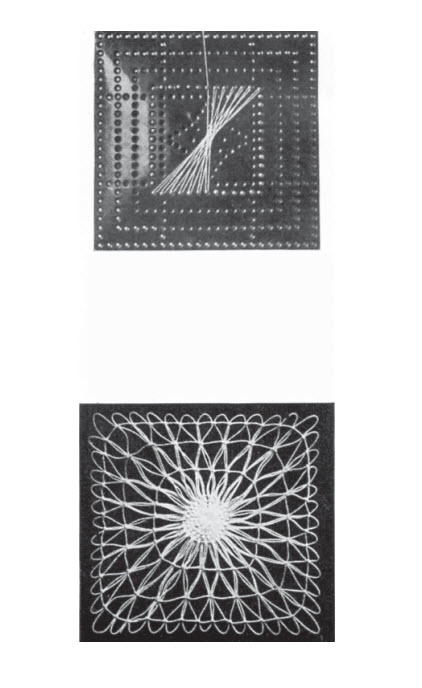

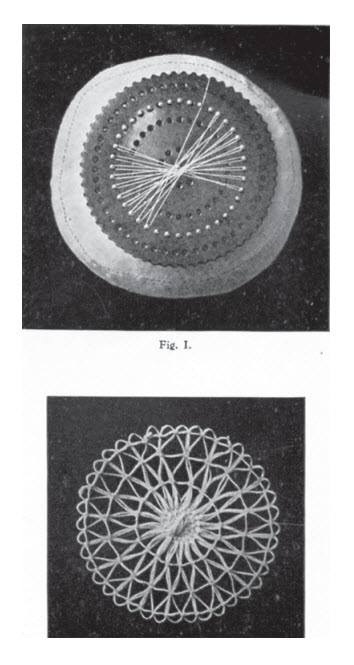

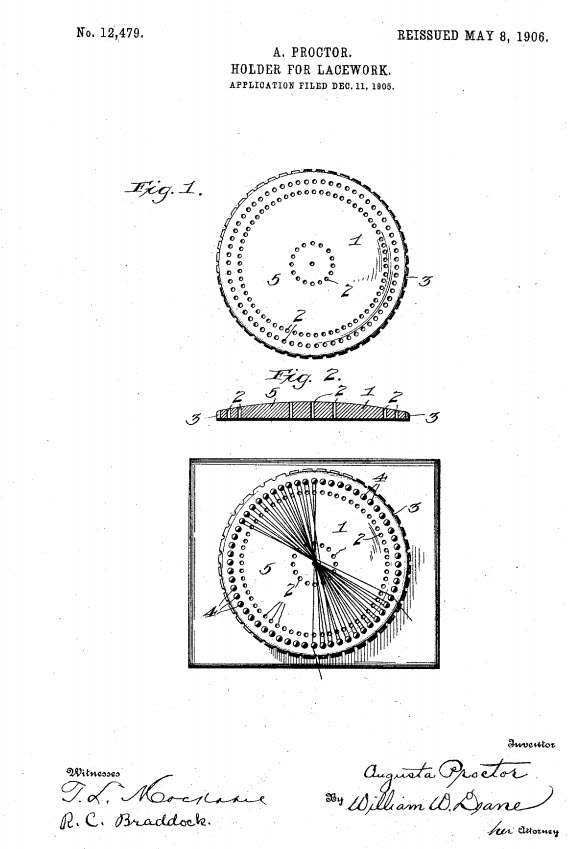

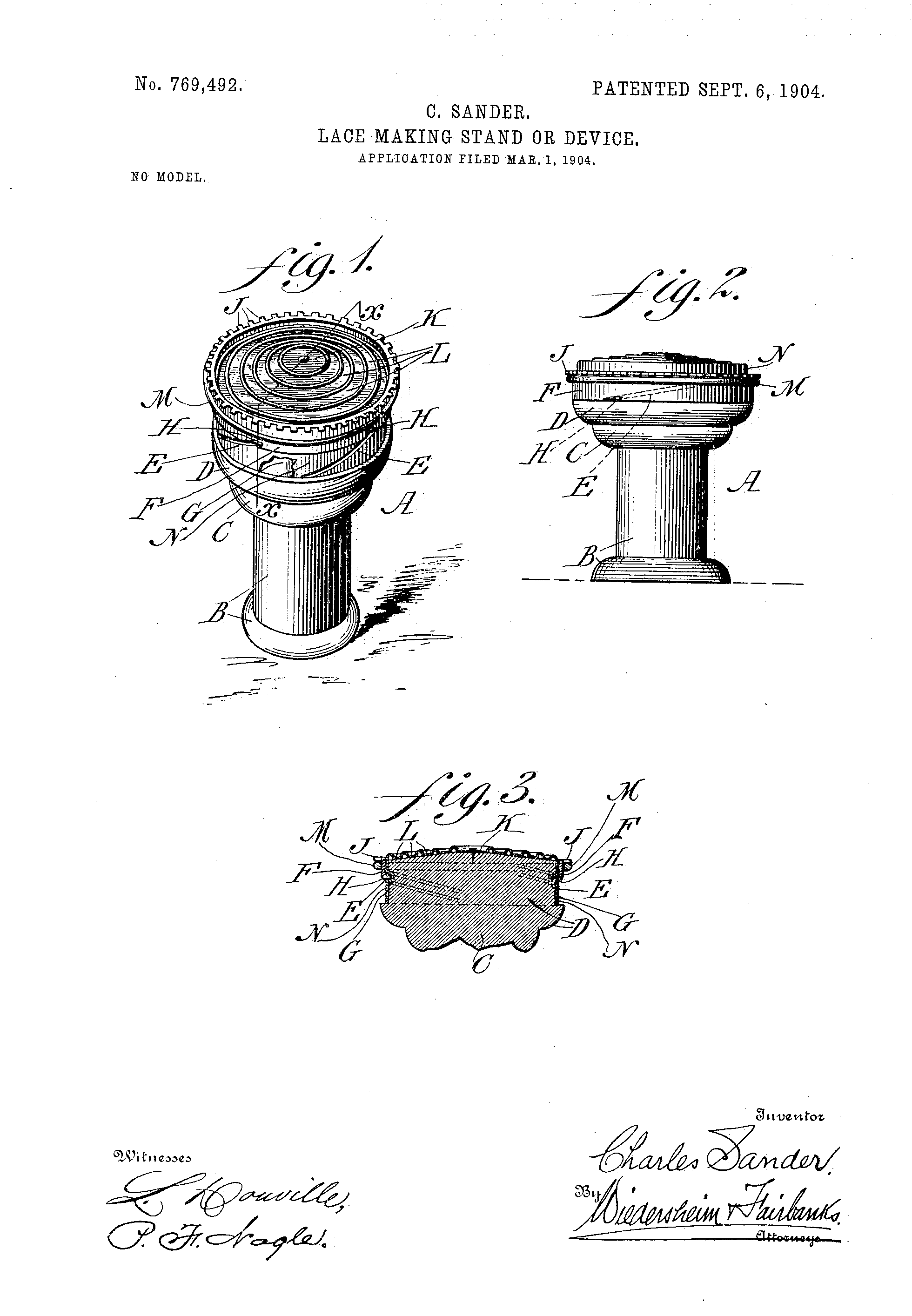

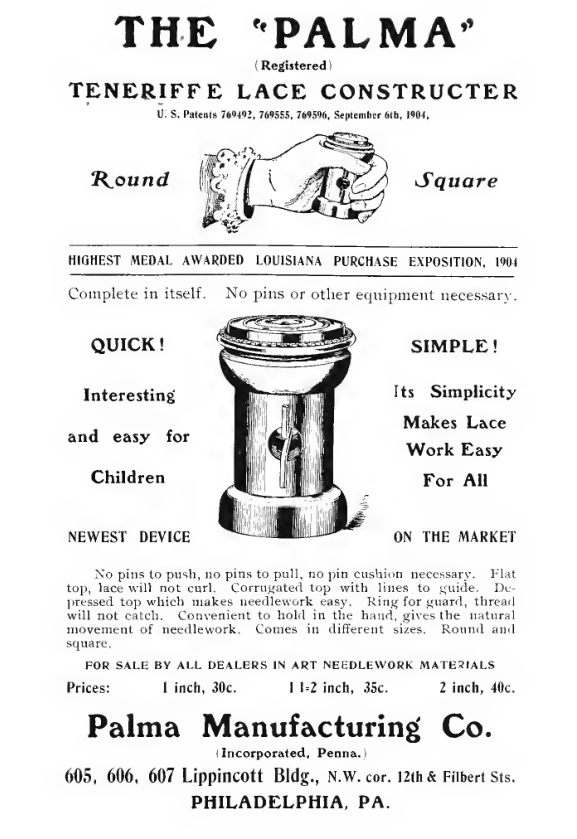

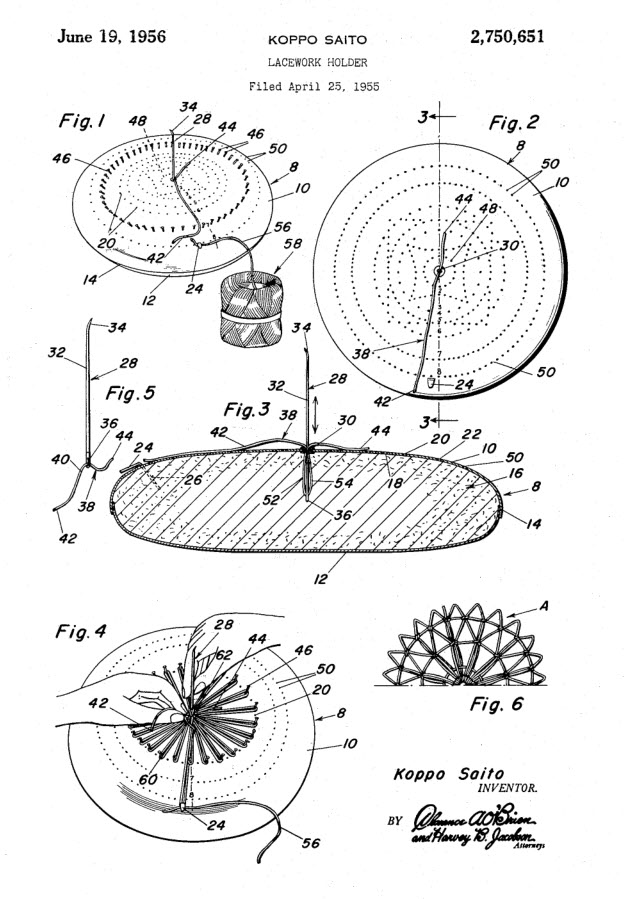

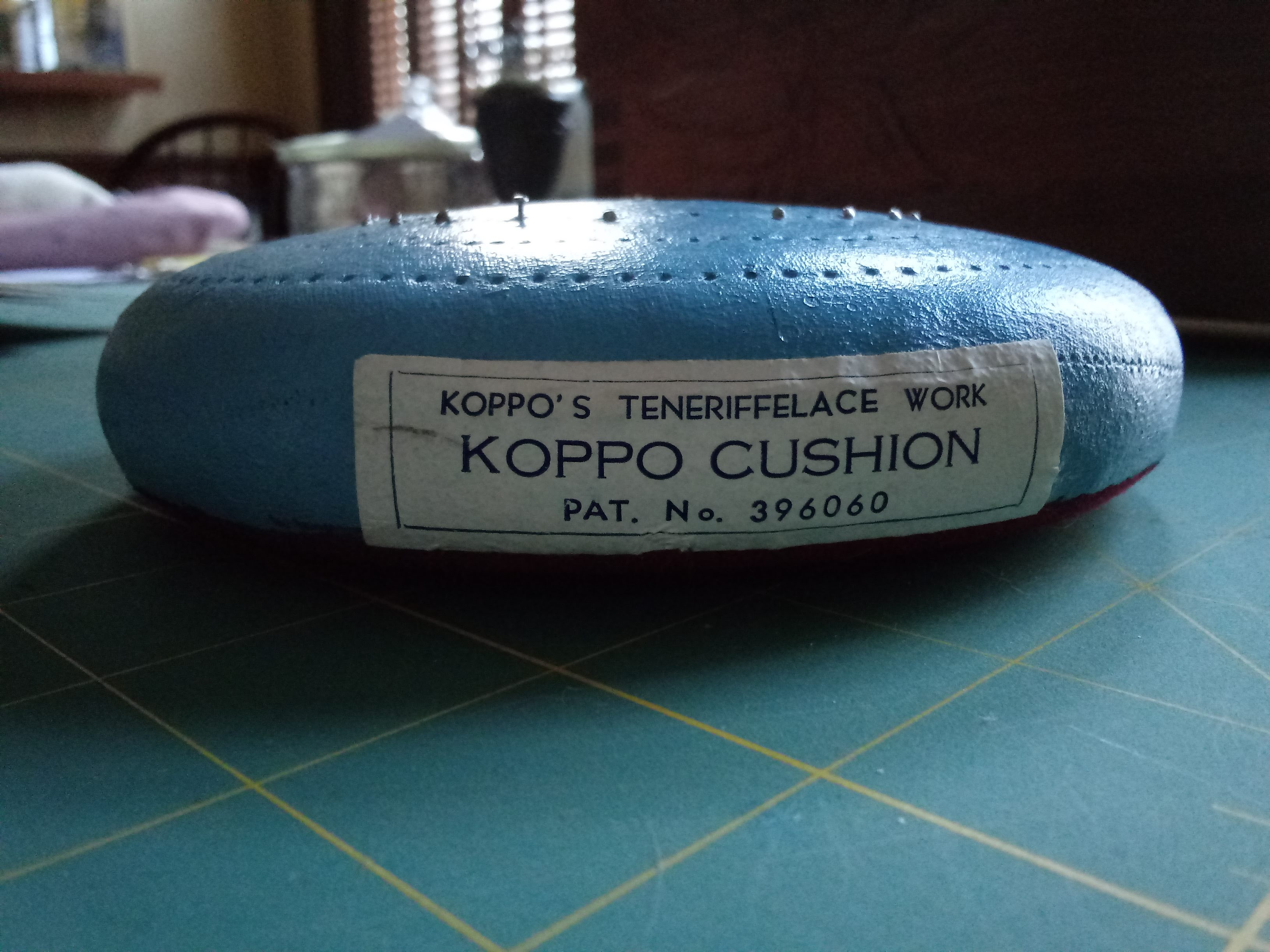

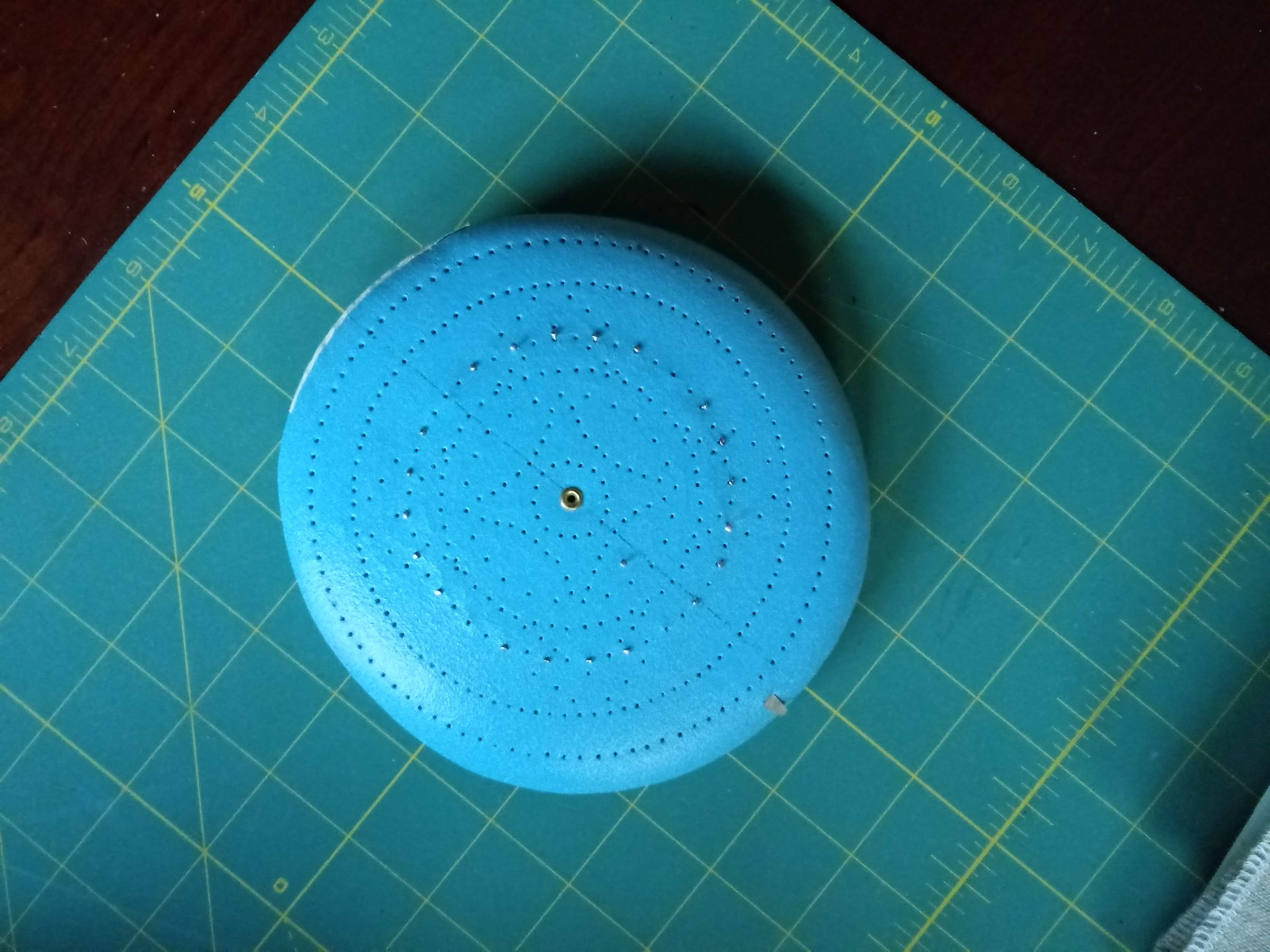

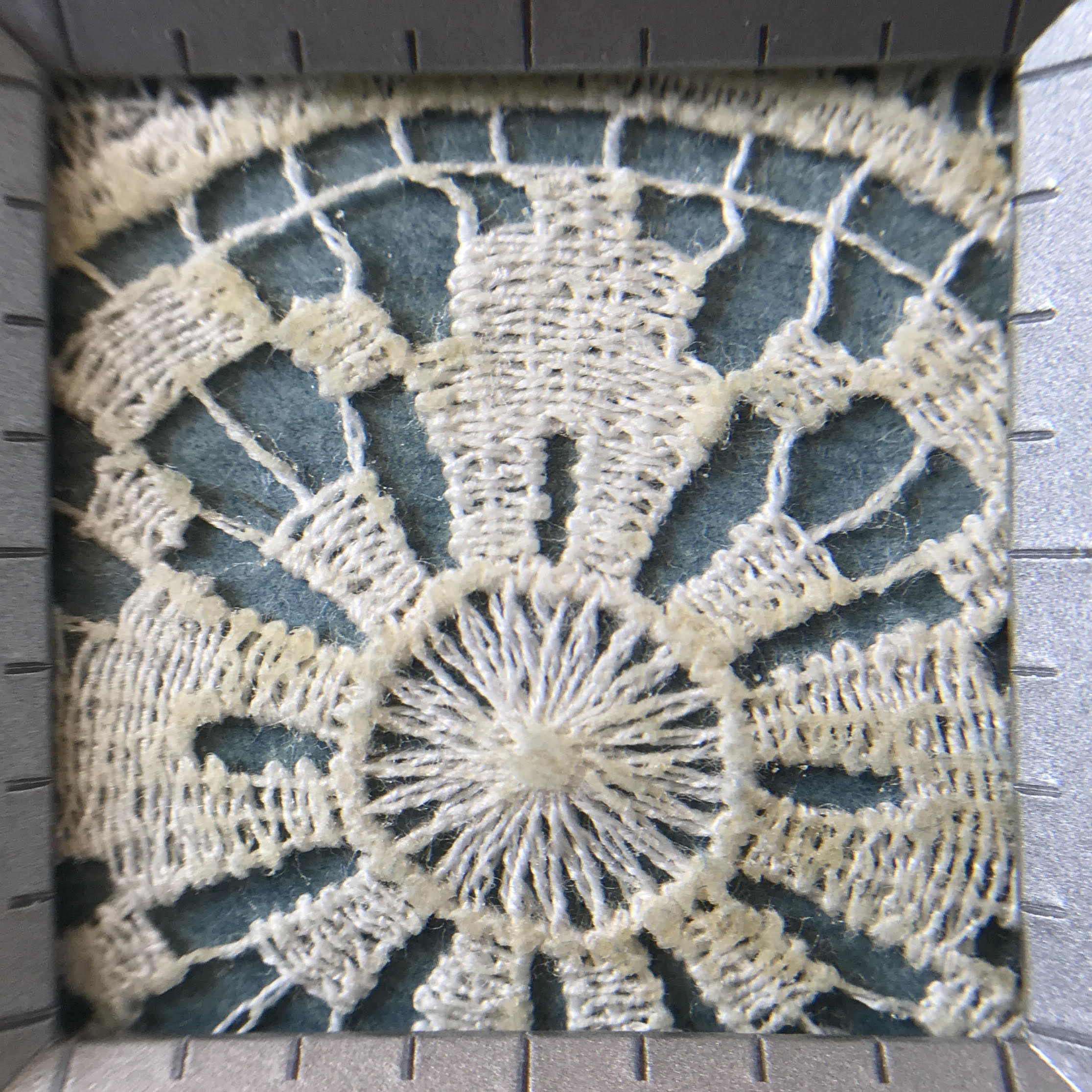

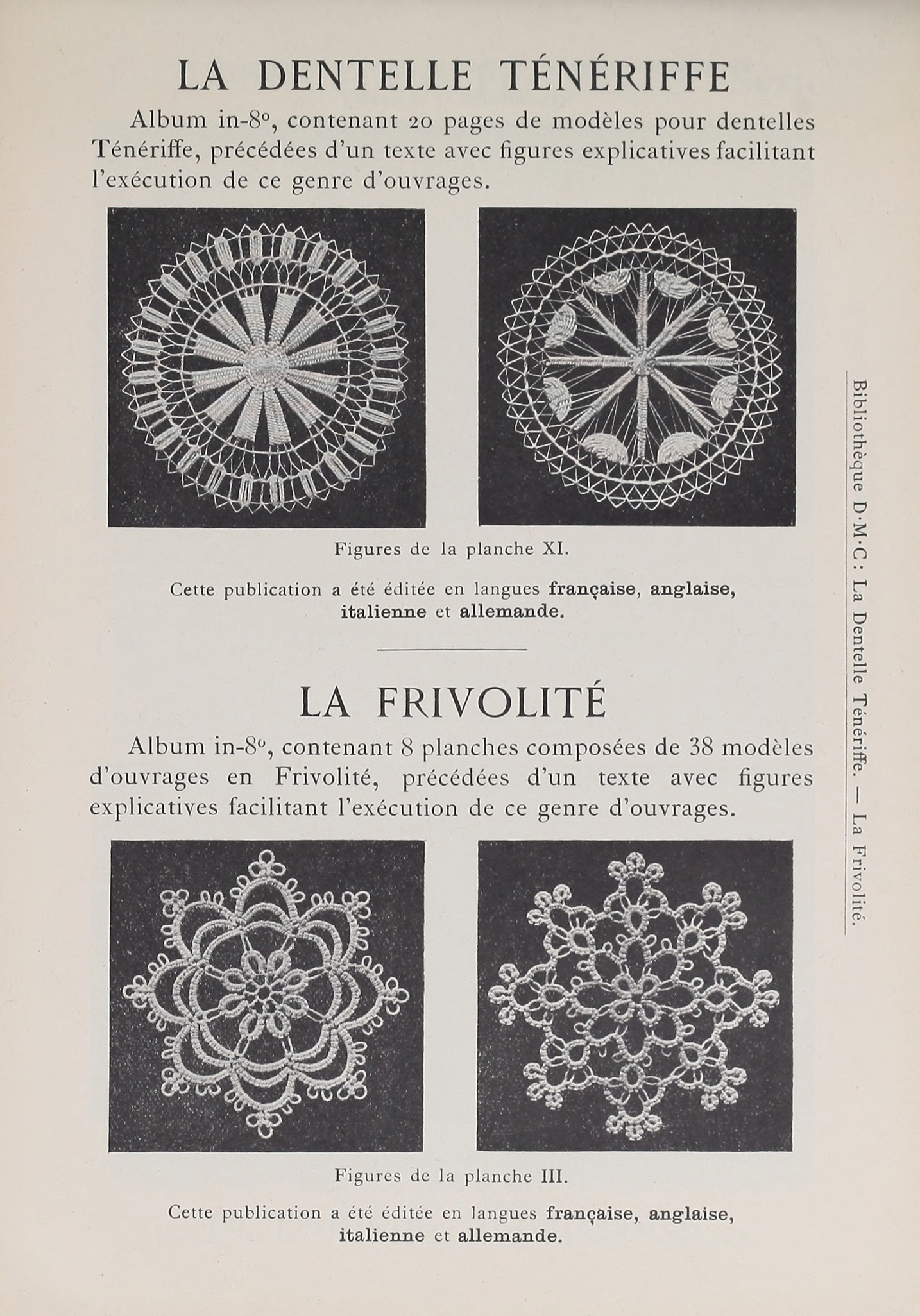
