= Haggar Clothing =

American menswear company

- Founded: 1926, Dallas, Texas
- Founder: Joseph M. Haggar
- Headquarters: Dallas, Texas, USA
- Number of locations: 80 (2019)
- Key people: President & CEO; Michael Stitt (2012-present); Paul Buxbaum (2009-2012); Terry Lay (2007-2009); Jim Lewis (2005-2007); Joe Haggar III & Frank Bracken (??-2005)
- Products: Men's clothing
- Owner: Randa Accessories (2019-present); Perseus LLC, Pou Chen (2005-2019); Haggar family (1926-2005)
- Number of employees: 1,400 (2019)
- Website: www.haggar.com

Haggar Clothing is a Dallas, Texas-based menswear brand sold in the United States, Mexico, and Canada. Haggar clothing is sold at retailers such as Macy's, Target, and Belk and its labels include Kenneth Cole men's apparel. Haggar supplies exclusive induction jackets for the Pro Football Hall of Fame, the Hockey Hall of Fame, the Naismith Memorial Basketball Hall of Fame, and the United States Bowling Congress Hall of Fame.

Haggar was acquired by Randa Accessories in 2019.

== History ==
Joseph Marion Haggar, Sr. (1892–1987), an immigrant from Jezzine, Lebanon, moved to Dallas in 1921. He worked as a traveling overalls salesman for several years before establishing his own company in 1926 in a one-room office with four employees and two sewing machines. Within two years, he had 500 employees manufacturing 75,000 pairs of pants each year. His son Ed Haggar started working in the family business at 14 years old and later published a book, 'Big Ed Haggar' and the Family Behind an Apparel Giant (2001), about his experience working in his father's shop with his siblings Joe Jr. and Rosemary. By 1938, Ed Haggar was working as a full-time salesman and returned after serving in World War II as a captain. Haggar factories ran 24 hours a day to supply clothing for the military; by the end of the war, more than ten million garments had been produced. By the end of the 1940s, Haggar was the largest producer and marketer of slacks in the world and Ed Haggar had moved from his role as vice president to president, where he stayed until 1971.

Since the 1940s, the company has inaccurately claimed to have coined the word slacks to reflect their use during "leisurely 'slack time'". Slacks referring to pants are recorded in the Oxford English Dictionary and Online Etymology Dictionary as dating back to 1824, originally to refer to military clothing. They may, however, have popularized the word in the United States. Haggar's pre-cuffed slacks were a major seller in the 1940s as they no longer required alterations from a tailor after purchase. Claims that Haggar created the first pre-cuffed pants are oftentimes alongside those attributing the etymology of slacks to the company, meaning that while it is reported, its accuracy is unclear.

During the 1950s, Haggar became the first menswear brand to advertise on national television when their ad aired during the Today Show. Mickey Mantle signed with the company in 1954 to appear in their advertisements, starting with the "first wrinkle-free pants," which were marketed as wash 'n' wear slacks. Haggar continued to improve this line and released another version in 1965. By 1968, they also introduced double knit slacks, an innovation that D Magazine reported "pushed the company to become the No. 1 pants brand in America." In August 1964, President Lyndon B. Johnson ordered six pairs of Haggar slacks over the phone from Joe Haggar, Jr., after receiving a pair as a gift from Joe Haggar, Sr. In the phone call, Johnson requested a couple of modifications "down where your nuts hang" on each of his slacks, noting his current pants were, "Like riding a wire fence"

During the 1970s, the brand grew to include sports coats and vests and were the first to introduce separates that allowed customers to purchase jackets and pants independent of each other. In 1971, the company also released the Haggar Hanger, a clothes hanger that allowed pants to be hung rather than folded on a table. A women's line of apparel was introduced in 1984. By 1987, the company employed 7,000 people at six plants in the United States, Mexico, and the Dominican Republic. During the 1980s, Haggar became the first apparel company to use EDI technology and to use UPC to ticket merchandise. In 1987, Haggar received a patent for the size strip sticker.

Haggar filed for Chapter 11 bankruptcy in January 1995. David Perdue joined the company in 1998 and as senior vice president began outsourcing much of the work. That year, the company had a net income of $8 million and $402.5 million worth of sales and acquired the dress company Jerell. Perdue became CEO of the company in 2001. The last major introductions before the Haggar family sold the company were the addition of moisture-wicking fabrics and pants with self-adjusting waistbands in 2002. In 2005, Perseus, LLC and part of the Pou Chen Group purchased the company for $212 million. Prior to this acquisition, Haggar "had an annual revenue of just under $500 million." These sales dropped when its women's lines and private labels were sold off. In 2013, Haggar reported about 700 total employees, 170 of which worked at the headquarters in Dallas. They acquired Tribal Sportswear in 2013 and Kizan International, Inc. in 2018. By 2019, Haggar had 1,400 employees worldwide, including 400 in Dallas, and was named the "No. 1 selling dress pant[s] brand in the U.S." by The NPD Group.

Haggar was acquired by Randa Accessories on May 31, 2019.

As of 2021, Haggar clothing is available in more than 10,000 stores and online.

== In media ==
=== Athletics ===
Haggar has a long-standing relationship with American athletic organizations and have featured a number of athletes in its advertising throughout the years. The MLB was represented by Mickey Mantle, whose sponsorship lasted from 1954 to the 1960s, Eddie Mathews, and Robin Roberts. PGA athletes included Arnold Palmer, Dow Finsterwald, and Doug Ford. Bobby Layne from the NFL also appeared.

Haggar began supplying the Pro Football Hall of Fame's iconic gold jacket in 1978. According to the NFL, the gold color is "hand-dipped for Haggar" and the only changes in the nearly 45 years of production are the wool used and the addition of a small amount of red to make the color look better on camera. Hall inductees are given a jacket made with their exact measurements. As of 2021, 354 jackets have been awarded. They began making induction jackets for the Hockey Hall of Fame in 2012 and for the Naismith Memorial Basketball Hall of Fame in 2014. The first NHL jacket went to Dallas Stars center Mike Modano. Haggar also makes induction jackets for the United States Bowling Congress Hall of Fame.

During the 1975 World Championship Tennis (WCT) regular season, Rod Laver and Arthur Ashe criticized newcomer Jimmy Connors' breakout success. Connors offered to buy them "'a pair of Haggars' to soothe the[ir] wounds," a reference to the WCT top regular season prize from Haggar. According to Haggar, he was the first WCT player to mention the company. "I'm sending Connors a dozen pair," an official joked. "What's his waist size?"

=== Television and film ===
John Travolta (1971), Super Dave Osborne (1990s), Steve Martin (1973), Howard Hesseman (1973), and Gene Barry all appeared in advertisements for Haggar Clothing. In 1998 episode of The Simpsons, Krusty the Clown mentions stealing a pair of Haggar slacks. In Season 2 of Frisky Dingo the presidential debate is hosted by Haggar slacks. This culminates in a giant statue of Hagar slacks falling and killing a character.
