= Randa Apparel & Accessories =

Clothing and accessory company

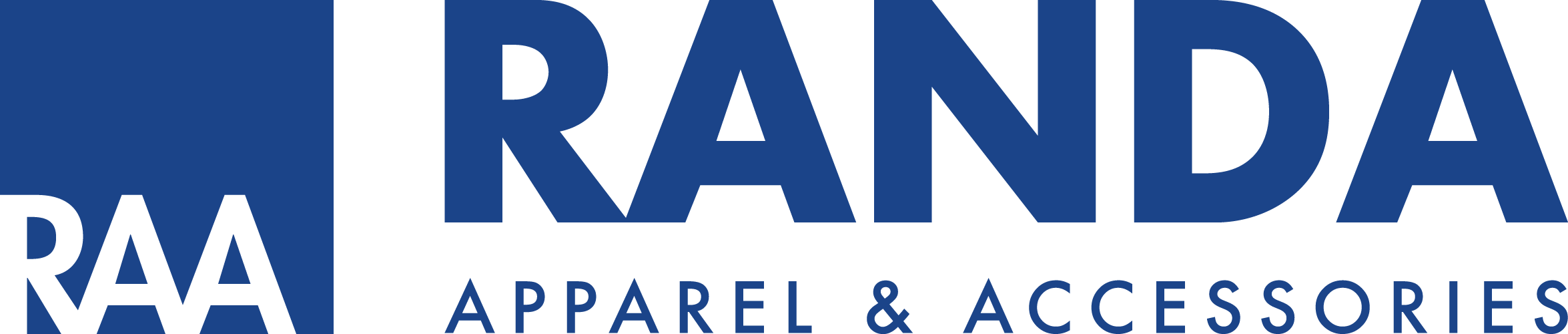
- Type: Private company
- Founded: 1910
- Products: Clothing, footwear, neckwear, jewelry, accessories, leather goods
- Number of employees: 2,000
- Website: randa.net

Randa Apparel & Accessories is a manufacturer, distributor, and marketer of clothing, footwear, neckwear, jewelry, accessories, and leather goods. It was known as Randa Accessories before acquiring Haggar Clothing in 2013.

The founder's family had been in the neckwear business since 1910 and the current company was incorporated in 1935. Through the company's Haggar Clothing Co. and Tribal divisions, Randa distributes men's and women's clothing.

Randa is a privately owned company. 2019 sales exceeded $1 billion.

== Offices and facilities ==
The company employs over 2,000 associates worldwide, with 27 offices in 12 countries. It consolidated its New York City offices into a new headquarters in 2013. Besides New York CIty, Randa has domestic US offices in Chicago, New Orleans, Dallas, Fort Worth, and Reno. Randa International offices are located in Canada, Mexico, Guatemala, the United Kingdom, India, South Africa, Australia, and China.

Randa Apparel & Accessories has sourcing facilities in Shanghai, Zhejiang Province, Fujian Province and in Guatemala City, Guatemala. North American distribution facilities are located in New Orleans, Reno, Fort Worth, and in Mississauga, Ontario. Randa design centers are located in New York City, Dallas, Montreal, London, Chicago, Guatemala City, Cape Town, and Shanghai.

The company has over 1 million square feet of distribution space located near New Orleans, New York City, Reno, Fort Worth, Edinburgh, Melbourne, Johannesburg, Toronto, and other cities. Together, these facilities have capacity to ship more than 100 million units and 1 million consumer direct shipments annually. In 2013 and 2014, the company announced investments of $25 million in its logistic's infrastructure. An additional $25 million logistics and IT investment was made in 2016 and 2017.

== History ==
Randa Accessories began on the Lower East Side of Manhattan as Spiegel Neckwear in 1910. Randa Neckwear, which was founded in 1935, was acquired by Herbert Spiegel in 1965 and provided the name of the current company.

The company has had a number of subsequent acquisitions: Woodstock Neckwear of London in 1993, Forsythe Neckwear of Mississauga, Ontario in 1995, WEMCO of New Orleans in 1997, Countess Mara of New York City in 1997, Humphreys Accessories of Chicago in 2001, and Badanco Luggage of Totowa, New Jersey in 2007.

Trafalgar Men's Accessories was founded in 1972 in Norwalk, Connecticut as a luxury manufacturer of men's belts and suspenders. Randa acquired Trafalgar in 2003.

Swank, Inc. (formerly publicly traded as SNKI) was acquired by Randa Accessories on May 17, 2012, and taken private. Swank was founded in 1897 and was engaged in the importation, sale and distribution of men's and women's belts and men's leather accessories, suspenders, and jewellery. Swank also distributed men's jewelry and leather items to retailers under private labels.

In 2019, Randa entered the apparel business with the acquisition of Haggar Clothing and of the 1971-founded women's sportswear company Tribal Sportswear, which had been acquired by Haggar in 2013.

In June 2024, Randa and Marquee Brands acquired Totes Isotoner.

== Brands ==
Randa produces and distributes products under license from many brands including: Levi's, Dockers, Tommy Bahama, Kenneth Cole, Tommy Hilfiger, Calvin Klein, Ben Sherman, Chaps, Columbia Sportswear Company, Dickies, Cole Haan, Guess!, Hanesbrands, Haggar Clothing, Tribal Fashion, and Jessica Simpson.

Randa also owns and markets brands including Haggar Clothing, Tribal, Exact Fit, Swank, Countess Mara, Mustang, Louis Raphael, and Damen+Hastings.

Randa Accessories partnered with Ryan Seacrest to create the "Ryan Seacrest Distinction" brand for apparel and accessories.

== Market Connect Group ==
Originally servicing Randa's internal requirements for in-store merchandising, Randa purchased Market Connect Group (MCG) in 2002. MCG provides in-store demonstrations, replenishment, brand ambassadors, and other services. MCG conducted over 20,000 in-store demonstrations in 2013.
