= Countess Mara =

Italian men's fashion brand

- Industry: clothing
- Founded: 1935
- Founder: Lucilla Mara de Vescovi
- Successor: Randa Accessories
- Headquarters: Italy
- Area served: Worldwide
- Products: belts leather goods neckwear shirts sportswear accessories

Countess Mara, founded in 1935 by Lucilla Mara de Vescovi, was an Italian menswear fashion label specialising in high-end pictorial neckties. The brand has been owned by Randa Accessories since 1998.

== History ==
Lucilla Mara de Vescovi was born in Rome, Italy, in 1893. Daughter of a very wealthy medicine professor of the University of Rome, descendant of an ancient noble family from the Veneto, and, from her mother's side, from baroness De Gleria from Trieste, descendant of baroness Maria Hatvany from Hungary. Her brother Silvio, a medical doctor and mining engineer, survived the sinking of the Lusitania and took care of the family's business interests in mining in Chile. She married Malcolm Whitman, an American singles tennis champion, in 1926. In 1930, following an argument about her husband's dull ties, his wife made him one from silk dress material. Following Whitman's suicide in 1932, she travelled through Europe, purchasing fabrics that she brought back to New York to launch a career making men's ties. Vescovi Whitman founded Countess Mara, her men's neckwear company, in 1935. While Mara was her second name, the company name might have been inspired by an 18th-century Kneller portrait of the Countess de Mar wearing a loosely tied Steinkirk cravat.

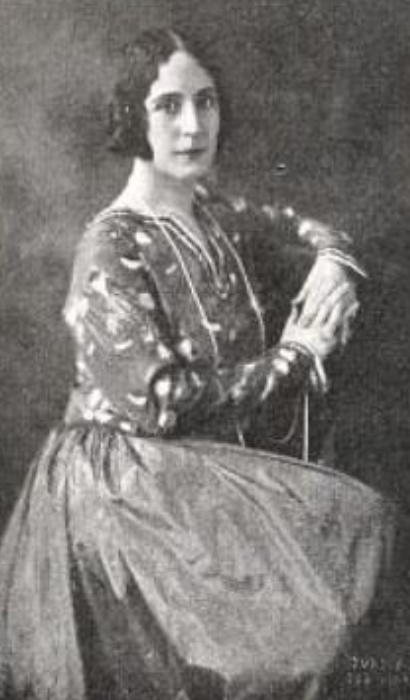
Lucilla de Vescovi, from a 1923 publication

Countess Mara's ties featured several novel marketing decisions. Vescovi Whitman had the C.M. initials featured on the outside blade of each tie, ensuring that they were instantly recognizable. The ties were made in very limited quantities, typically only fifteen dozen per design, and they were comparatively expensive. This led to their becoming collector's items, sought after by celebrities and fashion-conscious businessmen. As a designer, Vescovi Whitman aimed to make her ties colourful, interesting and artistic, while avoiding spectacular and showy designs. She described her ties as "jungles" populated with trees, flowers, and animals. However, her ties also featured a wide range of other subjects, including astrological signs, Egyptian hieroglyphs, the Devil, Lady Godiva, torn love-letters, and safety pins. Other tie manufacturers, noticing her success, copied her business model and hired artists to imitate her tie designs. Vescovi Whitman did not mind this, saying in 1949 that being imitated had "expanded the acceptability of the pictorial tie".

In 1944, Countess Mara was awarded the Neiman Marcus Fashion Award in recognition of the influence its ties had had upon fashion. Among their most high-profile wearers were Frank Sinatra, Eugene O'Neill and J. Edgar Hoover.

== Countess Mara Today ==
The Countess Mara brand was purchased in March 1998 by Randa Accessories, a major manufacturer and distributor of men's neckwear. Countess Mara belts, leather goods, neckwear, shirts, sportswear, and other products and accessories are retailed worldwide.
