= Totes Isotoner =

American apparel supplier

totes»ISOTONER
- Type: Private company
- Industry: Consumer Accessories
- Founded: 1924 (as Roll-O-Radio Company)
- Headquarters: 9655 International Blvd. Cincinnati, Ohio 45246, U.S.
- Key people: Daniel Rajczak, President & CEO
- Products: Umbrellas, Footwear, and Cold Weather Accessories
- Owner: Investcorp and Freeman Spogli & Co.
- Website: www.totes.com

Totes Isotoner Corporation, stylized totes»ISOTONER and often abbreviated to Totes, is an international umbrella, footwear, and cold weather accessory supplier, headquartered in Cincinnati, Ohio, United States. Totes is regularly billed in press reports as "the world's largest marketer of umbrellas". The company has divisions in the United States, Canada, UK, and France.

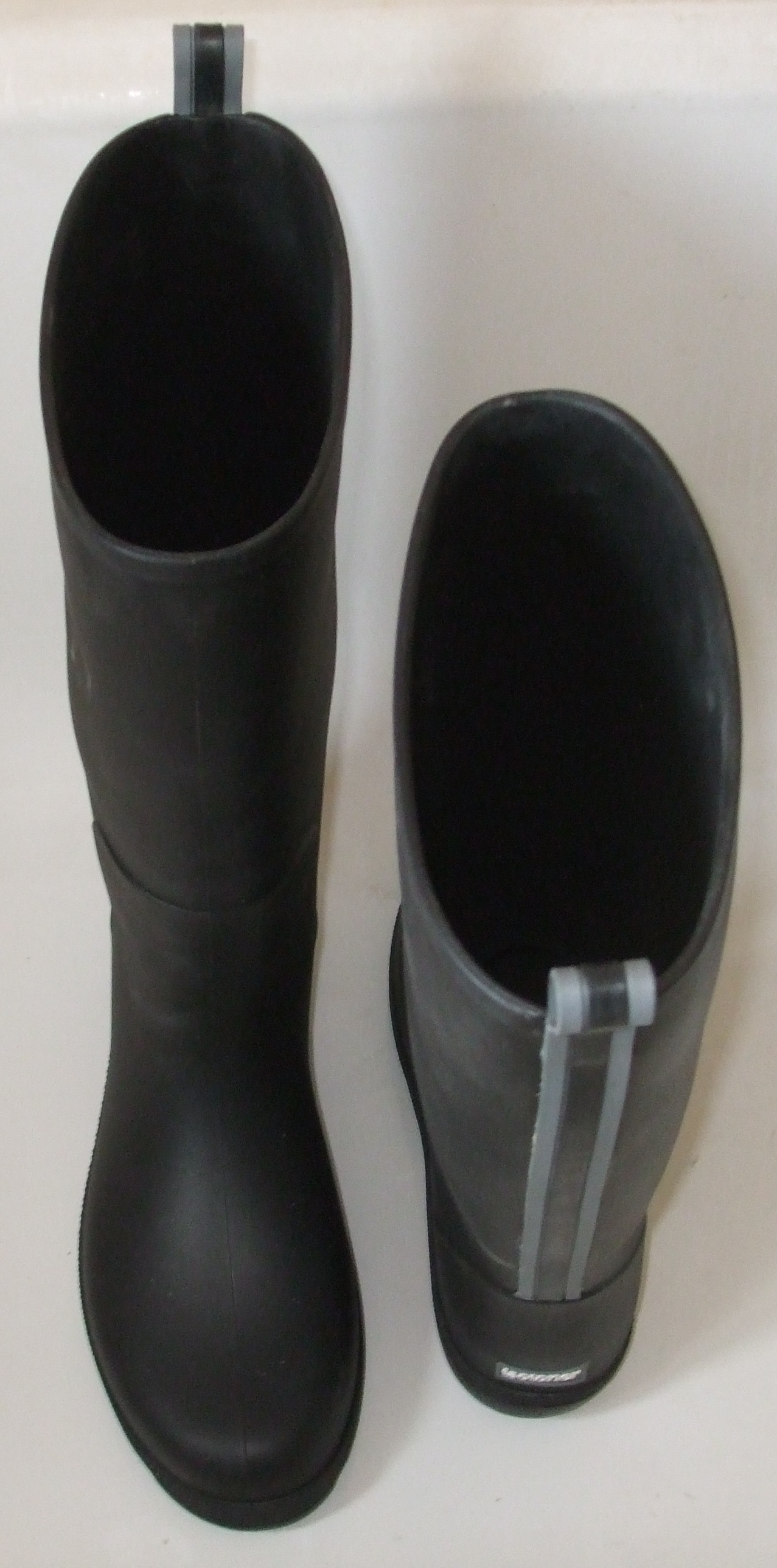
Totes Cirrus rainboots

The company sells products under totes, ISOTONER, and ESNY brands. Totes branded products include umbrellas, rubber footwear, ponchos, rain hats, and travel bags. Several licensed gift and boot products also carry the totes brand name. Mostly known for private label footwear, ESNY, now part of Totes Isotoner, is associated with branded products such as flip-flops, sandals, and ESNY Occasions wedding footwear. Totes Isotoner and ESNY branded products are carried by most national retailers in the United States, Canada, and Europe. Totes Isotoner itself has several sub-brands, including Cirrus, SolBounce, Zenz and Toasties.

== History ==
Totes Isotoner traces its roots back to the Roll-O-Radio Company, a mail-order radio kit supplier, which was incorporated in Cincinnati, Ohio, in 1924. In 1931, Roll-O-Radio Co. became "Perfect Manufacturing Company (Inc.)", whose So-Lo Works in Oakley, Ohio, developed a popular shoe-resoling product. Perfect Manufacturing Company moved to Loveland, Ohio, in 1942 with a name change to "So-Lo Works, Incorporated". From the mid-1940s to the late 1950s, company president Joe J. Marx designed, manufactured and marketed his successful "totes" line of foldable waterproof apparel, starting with "totes" women's slip-on overshoes for rainy days and culminating in Skooba-"totes" full-length dry exposure suits for diving and water-skiing. Bradford E. Phillips purchased So-Lo Works Inc. in 1961, renamed the company "Totes Incorporated" in 1965 and included "totes" collapsible umbrellas in the firm's repertoire in 1970, By the mid-1980s, Totes Inc. had become the world's largest supplier of such umbrellas. In 1994, Phillips sold Totes Inc. to Boston investment firm Bain Capital.

In 1997, Totes Inc. merged with ARIS»ISOTONER Incorporated, a producer of leather gloves. Aris Isotoner traced its roots to 1918, when French glovemaker Paul Chanut and American glove reseller Larry Stanton founded the Aris Glove Company, developing the first stretchable nylon glove with leather coverings and naming their design "ISOTONER" (a portmanteau of "isometric" and "toning") to highlight the glove's selling points. The American Sara Lee Corporation purchased Aris in 1974, changing the firm's name to Aris Isotoner. After the 1997 merger, the successor company was named "Totes Isotoner Corporation" to showcase the respective flagship products of Totes Inc. and Aris Isotoner. In 2001, Bain Capital sold Totes Isotoner to private equity fund Swander Pace Capital, which resold it in 2007 to MidOcean Partners. In 2014, Totes Isotoner was acquired by Investcorp and Freeman Spogli & Co. Thus far in the new millennium, Totes Isotoner has increased its product range, overseas presence and monetary value.

=== 1920s ===
The Roll-O-Radio Co. was incorporated on 9 April 1924 as a new business in Cincinnati, Ohio, with premises on Pearl and Race Streets in 1925 and on Third and Sycamore Streets from 1926 to 1930. As its name suggests, the company specialized in selling radio kits, including crystal sets and power supplies.

=== 1930s ===
On 1 June 1931, Roll-O-Radio Co. changed its name by charter amendment to "Perfect Manufacturing Company (Inc.)". After their Marx-Flarsheim advertising agency merged with the Archer Company in Cincinnati, president Joe J. Marx and treasurer Henry B. Flarsheim entered the manufacturing business with Roland R. Bollman of the Perfect Manufacturing Company in Cincinnati. Both Flarsheim and Bollman retired in 1935, when Marx, president, purchased the entire stock of the Perfect Manufacturing Company, which was then based in Oakley, Ohio. The firm’s So-Lo Works division made a rubber salve for resoling worn-out shoes during the Great Depression. The advertising slogan "Millions now use SO-LO to fix shoes for as low as 1¢ a repair" hinted at the name’s possible origin.

=== 1940s ===
In 1941, the So-Lo Works division acquires a one-story factory building at Twightwee near the Little Miami River in Loveland, Ohio, from the former occupant, the George E. Smith Company, candy manufacturer. 1 June 1943 sees a change of name by charter amendment to "So-Lo Works, Incorporated". During the Second World War, the US Government contracts So-Lo Works to manufacture military supplies including shoe dubbing and canned food in the new premises. The firm continues to serve the country’s civilian population through output of “make-do and mend” household repair products. So-Lo Works boosts morale and productivity by engaging all workers in management decision-making and by developing welfare and recreational facilities.

After the Allied victory in 1945, So-Lo Works quickly reconverts to civilian production with a reduced workforce. By a change in patterns, rubber protectors for anti-aircraft gun handles convert to women’s slip-on overshoes. In 1949, this very line leads to the development of tough, lightweight, foldable, stretchy latex-rubber overshoes called “totes” (slogan: “tote ‘em in your pocket”). So-Lo “totes” soon lead a market previously dominated by the major rubber manufacturers’ bulkier winter boots. Between 1945 and 1954, the firm’s prototypes earn six patents and registered designs. Ever the showman, company president Marx promotes his “totes” at any sales opportunity. In 1949, reportedly, the company makes 24,000 pairs per week and cannot fulfill all its orders.

=== 1950s ===
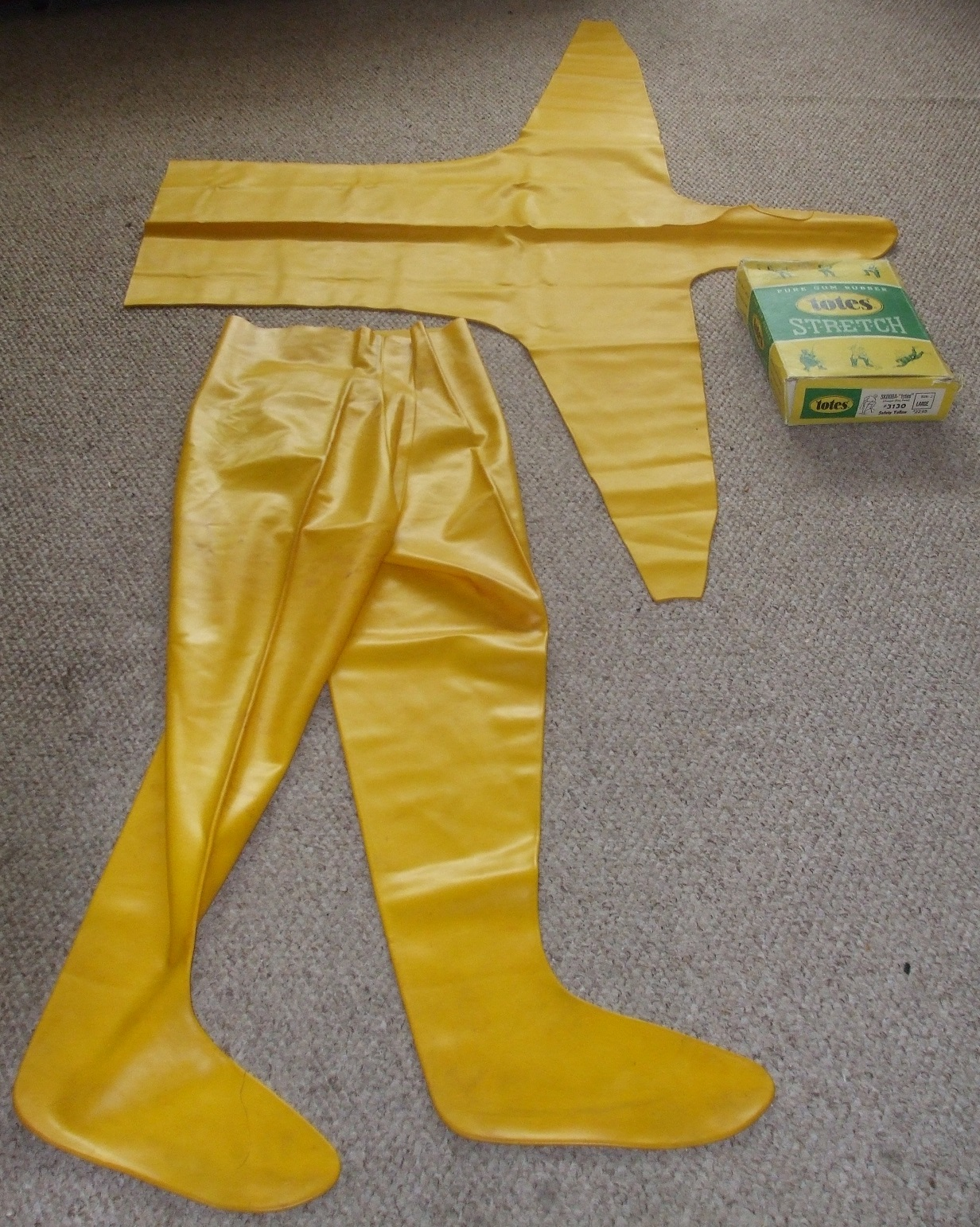
So-Lo Marx Skooba-"totes" dry suit

In 1950, So-Lo Works Incorporated vice-president Fred R. Heckman dies and the firm’s name changes to So-Lo Marx Rubber Co. of Loveland, Ohio. Later the same year, the company invites parents to submit snapshots of their children putting on their "totes" for use in national advertising. During the 1950s, the "totes" product family expands. The "world’s lightest" Hip-"totes" thigh-length fishing waders appear in 1955, while 1956 sees the introduction of Trouser-"totes", tough lightweight leggings for deer hunters. The firm markets the "world’s finest" Skooba-"totes" dry suits a year after a high-school student and a sporting-goods sales clerk trial the prototypes in the nearby Little Miami River early in 1957. Divers and water skiers alike welcome these low-cost full-length seamless exposure suits, which enable them to operate all year round.

=== 1960s ===
In the early 1960s, Skooba-“totes” dry suits not only prove popular across the US with divers, water skiers and now cavers, but also find favor with their counterparts in Australia, Canada, Denmark, Finland, France and the United Kingdom. In November 1961, Bradford E. Phillips, a Western Felt Works sales representative for industrial rubber and textiles, acquires 100% of So-Lo Marx’s outstanding capital stock. He continues as the sole stockholder until June 1994. Marx remains on the board until he retires to Sarasota, Florida, where he passes away, aged 70, in December 1967.

1 April 1965 sees So-Lo Marx Rubber Co. change by charter amendment to "Totes Incorporated". Company president Brad Phillips’s choice of name confirms his intention to refocus on the original lucrative "Totes" product of the late 1940s and early 1950s: lightweight rubber footwear that packs up into a small pouch when not in use. Other So-Lo Marx product lines — diving suits, rubber cement, resoling material, meat tenderizer, bicycle seats, instant gravy, plaster statuette molds — face imminent cancellation.

=== 1970s ===
In 1970, Phillips adds a collapsible umbrella to the Totes range of wet-weather gear, whose selling point is the ability to fold out of sight when no longer required. Having failed twice to devise his own working prototype, he discovers that L.P. Henryson & Co. Inc. of New York has created a successful design and he buys the company to obtain its 1968 patent. Totes is now on course to become the world’s largest manufacturer of such umbrellas. On 28 February 1972, Totes Incorporated files agreement of merger with Eastman Products Corporation, Marx Pure Foods Inc. and L.P. Henryson Company Inc. In 1975, Phillips introduces a water-repellent hat after considering the time has come again for men's headgear, finding less success later, however, with his stainproof ties.

=== 1980s ===
In 1983, Phillips secures US patent 454275 for an "umbrella with advertising flag", which acknowledges the pre-existence of the 1968 Henryson Co. collapsible umbrella patent. In 1986, Totes Inc. is reported to be the largest umbrella seller in the US with over half the company's revenue coming from umbrella sales. Totes' umbrella production is outsourced to Taiwan, one of the world's major umbrella-making centers. In 1987, the airline TWA enables passengers to purchase Totes umbrellas when they are on international flights. In 1988, one-size-fits-all Totes "Toasties", "cozy slipper socks to wear on those cold winter nights", go on sale.

=== 1990s ===
In 1994, Bain Capital acquires Totes. Three years later, in 1997, the totes ISOTONER corporation is formed from the merger of Totes corporation and ARIS»ISOTONER Incorporated, a producer of leather gloves.

Aris Isotoner dates back to 1918, when French glovemaker Paul Chanut and American glove reseller Larry Stanton found the Aris Glove Company. They develop the first stretchable nylon glove with leather coverings. They name it ISOTONER (combining the terms "isometric" and "toning") to reflect the stretchability and comfortable fit of this commercially successful glove. After being purchased by the American Sara Lee Corporation in 1974, Aris changes its name to Aris Isotoner.

So the "Totes" and the "Isotoner" in the company name reference both merged firms' flagship products. The change of name from "Totes Incorporated" to "Totes Isotoner Corporation" is registered on 1 August 1997. By late 1998, Totes Isotoner has a new headquarters in West Chester Township, Butler County, Ohio and a website at totes.com.

=== 2000s ===
In July 2001, Bain Capital completes sale of Totes Isotoner to San Francisco private equity fund Swander Pace Capital. In December 2001, the company is reported to have "gone global" with "about 1000 employees" and "offices in New York, Toronto, London, Paris and Hong Kong". In 2006, Totes Isotoner buys ESNY, the casual footwear division of New York-based E.S. Originals Inc., whose particular product focus is fashion flip-flops and canvas shoes. MidOcean Partners, a New York based private equity firm targeting investments in the middle market, acquires Totes Isotoner in January 2007 in a $288 million deal. MidOcean helps the company to expand its product offerings globally completing five acquisitions, including Northern Cap and Glove, Acorn Products, Manzella, Just Sheepskin and Grandoe.

=== 2010s ===
In 2014, MidOcean agrees to sell Totes Isotoner to Investcorp and Freeman Spogli & Co. The deal values Totes Isotoner at between $500 million and $600 million. Freeman Spogli fully exits its investment in Totes in 2019. In April 2019, Totes Isotoner registers the trademark "Totes Cirrus" for the purpose of launching in the final months of the year a lightweight and virtually compression-proof rainboot billed as "tough as boots, light as clouds" and using proprietary Everywear compound technology.

=== 2020s ===
In February 2020, Totes Isotoner introduced "Sol Bounce" flip flops, slides and water shoes, using the Everywear technology. That technology was also built in a new comfort footwear line from Isotoner, "Zenz." By 2020, totes UK launched a range of vegan slippers.

In June 2024, totes Isotoner was acquired by Marquee Brands and Randa Apparel & Accessories.

== Gallery ==
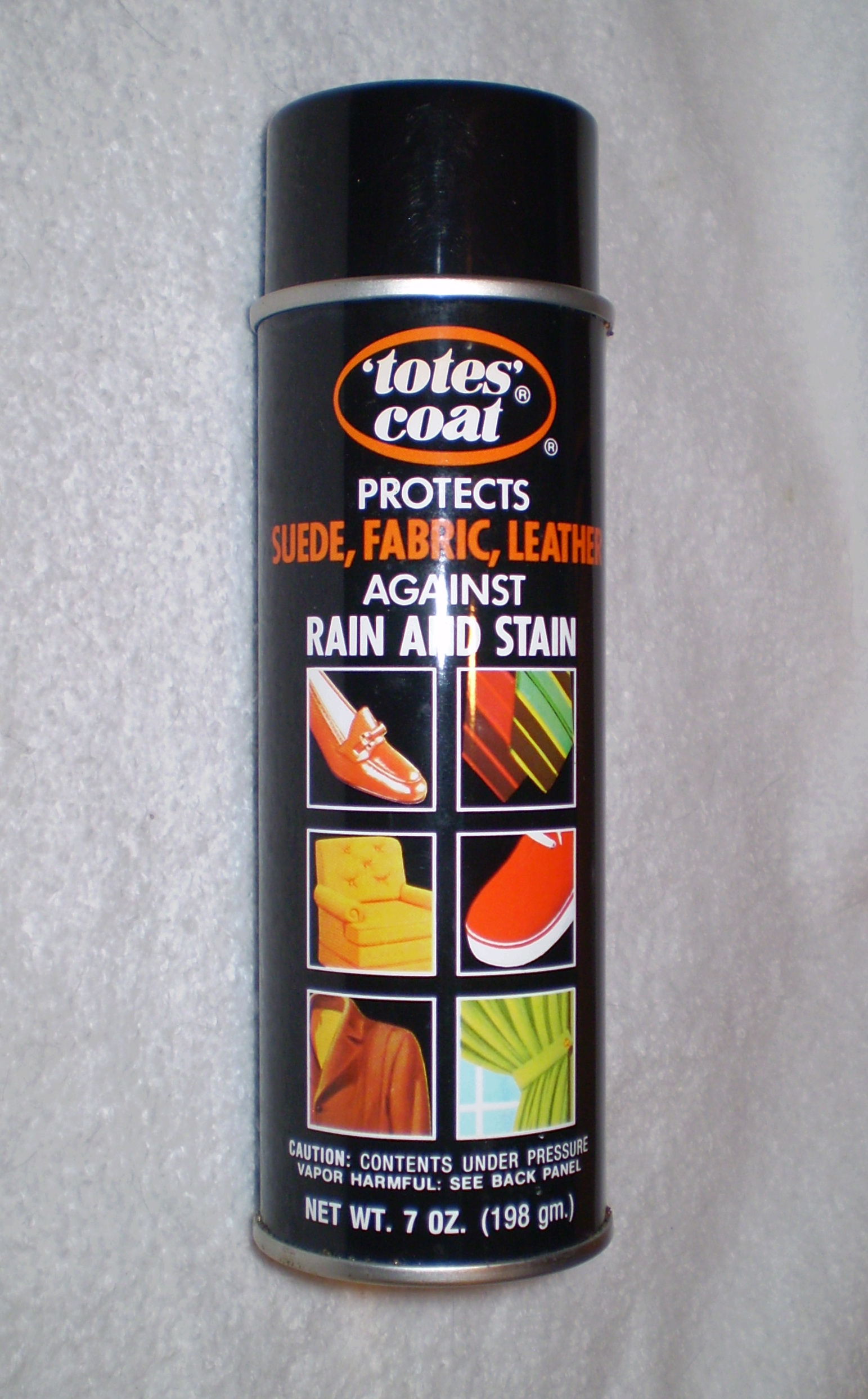
'totes' coat Spray Bottle

== Controversy ==
- In 1933, 32-year-old Perfect Manufacturing Company rubber-cement mixer Thomas Estees was found dead after inhaling rubber-cement fumes as he worked the night shift in an unventilated room whose extractor fan had stopped operating. Police were told that rubber-cement fumes would kill a person within ten minutes.
- In 1962, an estimated $100,000 damage was done to the So-Lo Marx Rubber Company by a fire and explosion in which one person was injured. A gas tank being welded suddenly exploded, setting chemicals in the area on fire, blasting out a wall and shattering windows up to half a mile away.
- In 1995, Isotoner Gloves allegedly worn by O. J. Simpson were presented by the prosecution in his murder trial.
- In 2009, the Ohio Supreme Court ruled in favor of Totes Isotoner Incorporated in a high-profile discrimination case filed by LaNisa Allen, a former employee. Allen had been terminated for taking unauthorized breaks to pump breast milk.

== See also ==
- Umbrella
