= Ultimate Revenge =

American television series

Ultimate Revenge is a reality television series about fulfilling the fantasy of anyone who wants to seek revenge on their nearest and dearest. It was hosted by Ryan Seacrest. Several episodes featured radio talk show host Karel. It was shown on The New TNN from 2001 to 2003.

Ultimate Revenge premiered August 21, 2001.
