= Henry Gene Skeen =

United States Army general

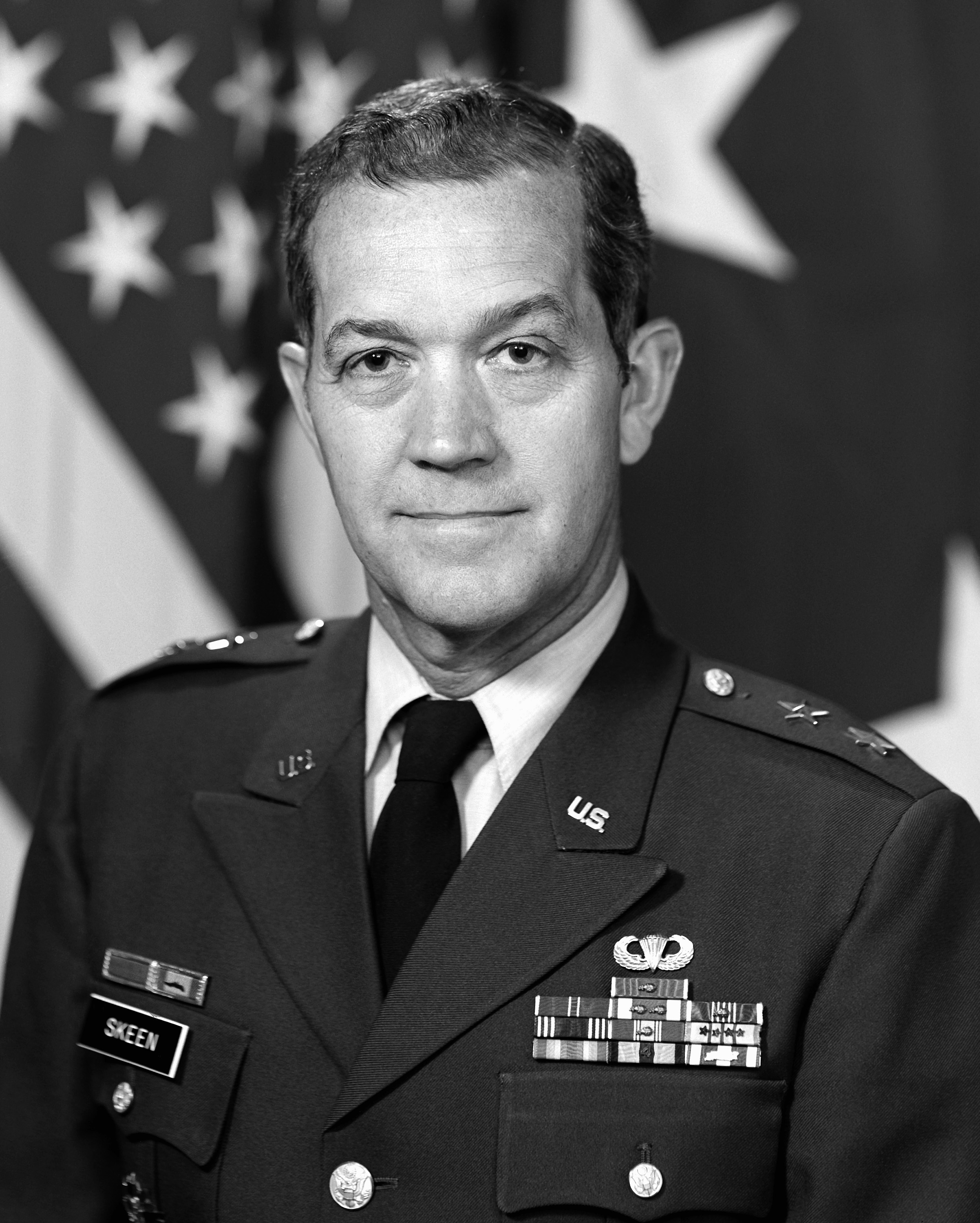
- Born: 26 May 1933; Dale County, Alabama, U.S.
- Died: 12 January 2006 (aged 72); Atlanta, Georgia, U.S.
- Relatives: Ryan Seacrest (grandson)
- Military career
- Allegiance: United States
- Branch: United States Army
- Service years: 1949–1974
- Rank: Major general
- Nickname: Hank
- Commands: U.S. Army Logistic Evaluation Agency
- Conflicts: Vietnam War

Major Gen. Henry Gene "Hank" Skeen (26 May 1933 – 12 January 2006) was a general of the United States Army.

A native of Dale County, Alabama, Skeen entered the Air Force in 1949 and transferred to the United States Army in 1953. Upon completion of Officer Candidate School that year, he was commissioned a second lieutenant in the Infantry. After serving as platoon leader in various Infantry and Airborne companies, he was awarded a Regular Army commission as a quartermaster first lieutenant in 1958.

During most of his career, Skeen held important quartermaster mission-related command and staff positions, including Director, Supply and Maintenance in the Office of the Deputy Chief of Staff for Logistics, Secretary of General Staff, U.S. Army Computer Systems Command; and Assistant Deputy Chief of Staff for Logistics, U.S. Army Europe and Seventh Army; and Secretary to the General Staff, U.S. Army Computer Systems Command, Fort Belvoir, Virginia. His important commands included Commander, U.S. Army Troop Support Command in St. Louis, Missouri; Commander, Defense Industrial Support Center in Philadelphia, Pennsylvania; Commander, Defense Reutilization and Marketing Service in Battle Creek, Michigan; Commander, 88th Supply and Service Battalion in Vietnam; Commander, Regional Support Activity, Military Region II, Vietnam; Commander, U.S. Army Logistic Evaluation Agency at New Cumberland Army Depot; and Commander, Burtonwood Army Depot in England.

Skeen played a pivotal role in launching the Quartermaster Corps into the automation era in the 1960s and 1970s, and later lent major support to the establishment of the Army Supply Excellence Award and the Army Supply Master Plan. In 1997, he was inducted into the Quartermaster Hall of Fame.

Skeen was married to Pauline; and to Nancy Johnson Skeen at the time of his death. Amongst his grandchildren is Ryan Seacrest. Skeen died at Emory University Hospital on 12 January 2006, and was buried in Arlington National Cemetery on 24 February 2006, with full military honors.
