= Wild Animal Games =

- Genre: Game show
- Directed by: Jerry Kupcinet
- Presented by: Ryan Seacrest
- Narrated by: Randy West
- Composer: Wendy DeAugustine
- Country of origin: United States
- No. of seasons: 1
- No. of episodes: 65

Production
- Executive producer: Woody Fraser
- Production locations: Glendale Studios, Glendale, California
- Running time: 30 minutes
- Production companies: Woody Fraser Enterprises; MTM Enterprises

Original release
- Network: Family Channel (daily)
- Release: October 2, 1995 – September 22, 1996

Wild Animal Games is an American television game show that aired on the Family Channel from October 2, 1995 to September 22, 1996. It was hosted by Ryan Seacrest with a chimpanzee named Eddie serving as co-host, and Randy West as announcer. The series featured children competing against each other to learn about various species of animal.

== Gameplay ==
=== First Game ===
A different game was played each day based on the behavior of the animal of the day. Two teams usually competed against each other. Games included playing polo on donkeys or collecting eggs like penguins.

=== Chimp Challenge ===
In this game, two kids competed against each other in a memory game. A brief video documentary about the animal of the day was shown to the contestants, and then, three questions were posed about the video. The first question was worth 50 points, the second was worth 100, and the third question was worth 150 points. After this, a second video was shown with and three more questions were asked with doubled point values. Each child also had a parent or teacher with them. The parent/teacher of the losing team was subjected to some sort of messy penalty, including getting slime dumped on them or being put in the "pie guillotine."

=== Waterfall Prize Pool ===
The final game of the day featured a tiny pool set up in the back lot. None of these games had anything to do with the featured animal of the day. For the first few weeks, five kids competed against each other in games such as shooting basketballs while going down a water slide, and throwing balls through a tire while sliding down the slide.

Shortly after the show's premiere, the format changed to feature two teams of three kids each competing in a relay race. The relay changed each day.
